= Copanello =

Italian hamlet in Stalettì

- Frazione
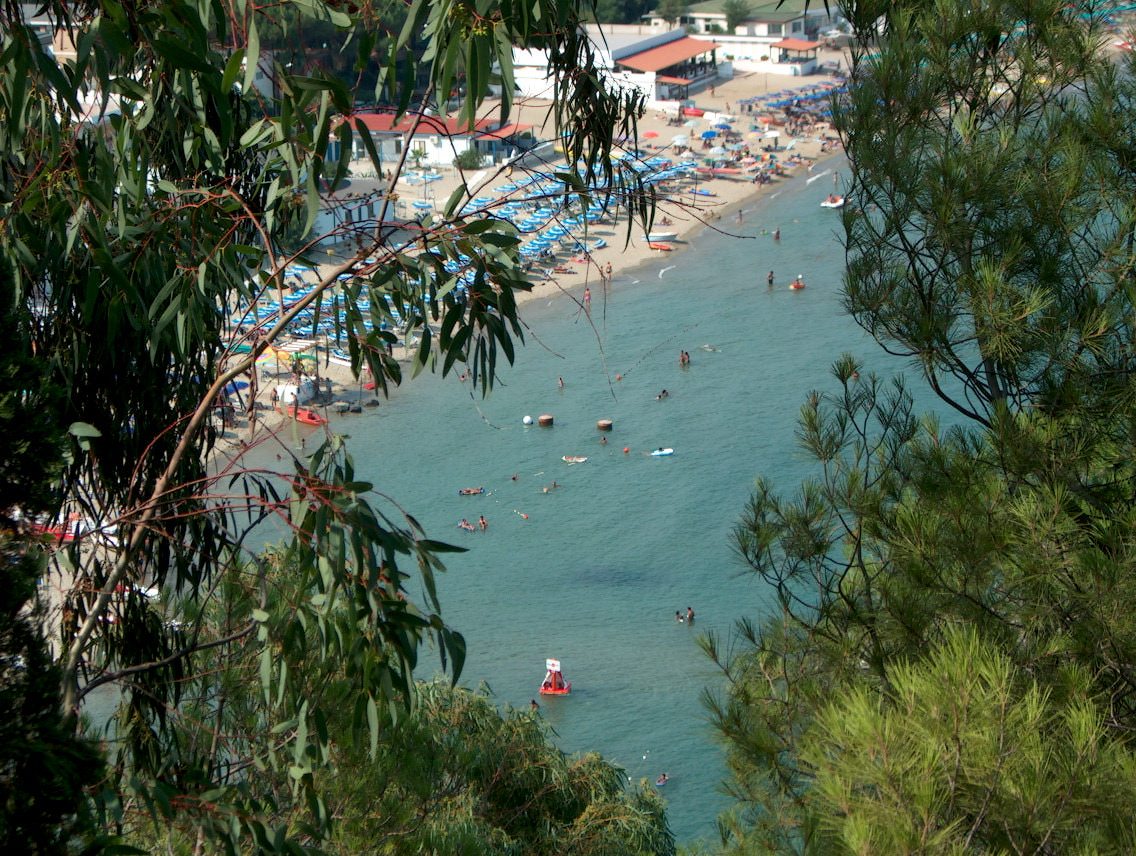
- Copanello Lido beach
- Interactive map of Copanello
- Coordinates: 38°46′06″N 16°33′59″E
- Country: Italy
- Province: Catanzaro
- Municipality: Staletti
- Demonym: Stalettesi (the same as the commune it belongs to)

Copanello or Copanello de Stalettì is a frazione (a hamlet, in Italy) of the municipality of Stalettì in the province of Catanzaro. It's a seaside resort on the Ionian coast nicknamed la perla dello Jonio catanzarese, i.e. the Pearl of the Ionian Sea of Catanzaro. It is bounded to the north by the Alessi river and to the south by the Lamia torrent. Copanello itself is divided into two hamlets: Copanello Alto and Copanello Lido.

In the 14th century, Copanello was part of the estate of the Latin politician and writer Cassiodorus (485–580). Around 555, he built the Vivarium monastery (now in Copanello Alto) and the Chapel of San Martino. Under the name of Coscia, it was a dependency of the town of Squillace until the early 19th century, when it became part of the municipality of Stalettì.

From the 17th to the 19th century, Copanello belonged to the Pepe family, before becoming the property of various Italian patriots (Guglielmo Pepe, Enrico Cosenz, Damiano Assanti, Francesco Carrano, Girolamo Calà Ulloa and Camillo Boldoni), who sold it to Baron Scoppa. The territory of Copanello Lido was then inherited by the Lucifero family, whose last owner was Francesco Lucifero, while that of Copanello Alto was sold to Achille Fazzari, then to the Falcone family and finally to the Gatti family.

The first house on Copanello Lido was built in 1954, and the Villagio Guglielmo Vacation Village was inaugurated in 1969.

In 1957, Giovanni Gatti opened the Motel Copanello in Copanello Alto. From the mid-1960s onwards, Copanello was home to celebrities such as Frank Sinatra, Renato Rascel, Totò, Bobby Solo, Rita Pavone, Gloria Gaynor, Gino Paoli, Raf Vallone and Peppino di Capri.

== Toponymy ==
Until the mid-19th century, the western part of Copanello Lido was occupied by the Casino Pepe estate, while Copanello Alto and the Copanello Lido coastline were known as La Coscia (due to their proximity to the Coscia de Stalettì mountain range, at the foot of which Copanello Lido was situated and on which Copanello Alto was built). La Coscia territory was located in the Marina de Squillace. The name Copanello only appeared in the early 20th century, replacing La Coscia.

== Geography ==
=== Location ===
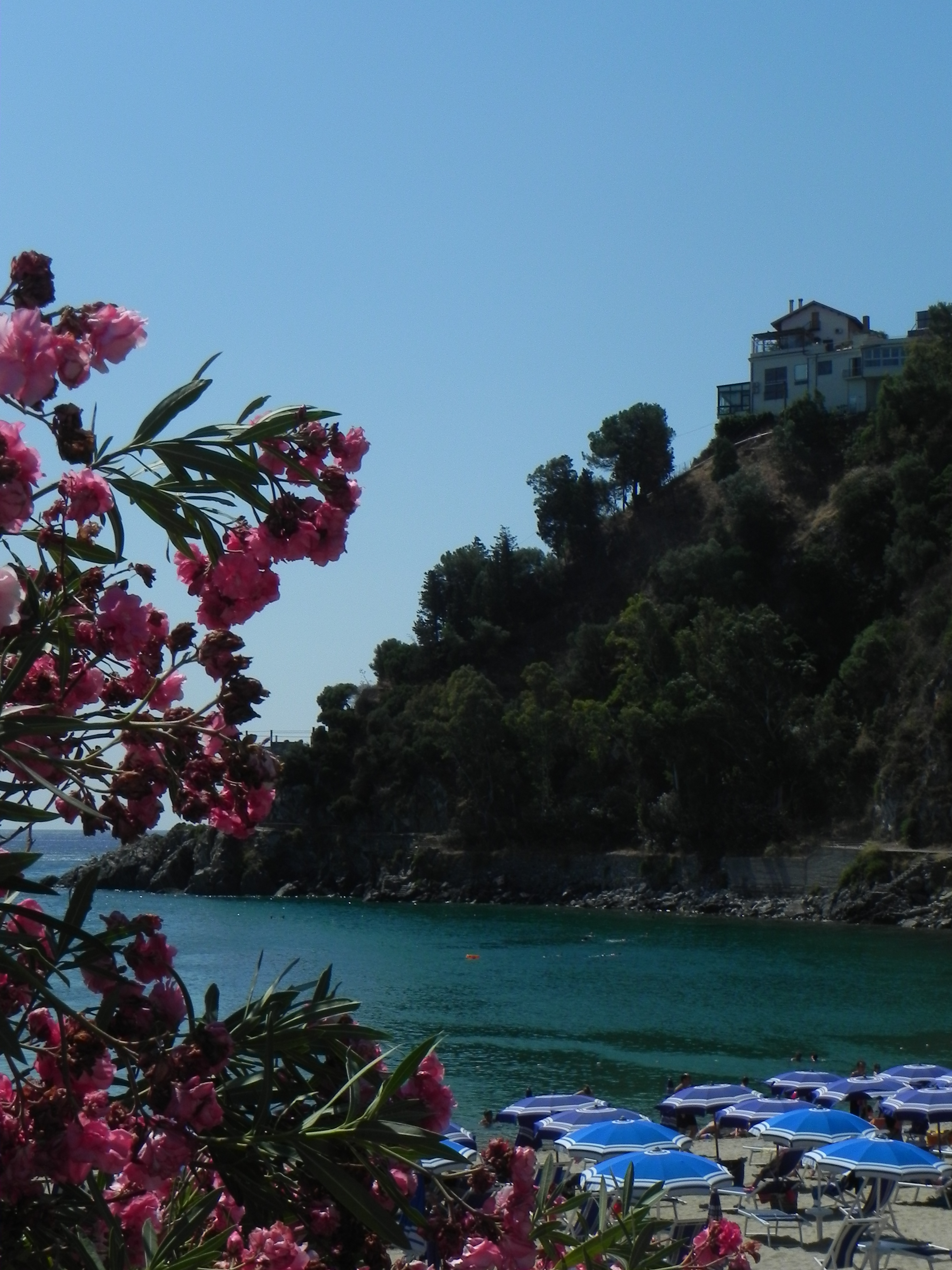
La Coscia of Stalettì

Copanello lies at the eastern end of the isthmus of Catanzaro, in the center of the Gulf of Squillace, in the area known as Costa dei Aranci (Orange Coast) or Costa dei Saraceni (Saracen Coast). The locality's northern boundary with Squillace Lido (a frazione of the municipality of Squillace) is the River Alessi, whose mouth is near the Hotel Club Poséidon, in Copanello Lido. Copanello's southern boundary with Santa Maria del Mare (frazione of the commune of Stalettì) is the Lamia torrent. To the southwest, it borders the village of Stalettì, while to the west, it borders the municipality of Squillace.

Copanello Lido lies on the coast of the Gulf of Squillace, almost at sea level, at the foot of the Coscia di Stalettì or Coscia de Squillace (a Calabrian mountain also known as Mons Moscius in the time of Cassiodorus and later as Coscia della baronessa), while Copanello Alto lies on the Coscia di Stalettì, overlooking the Gulf of Squillace at around 100 m above sea level.

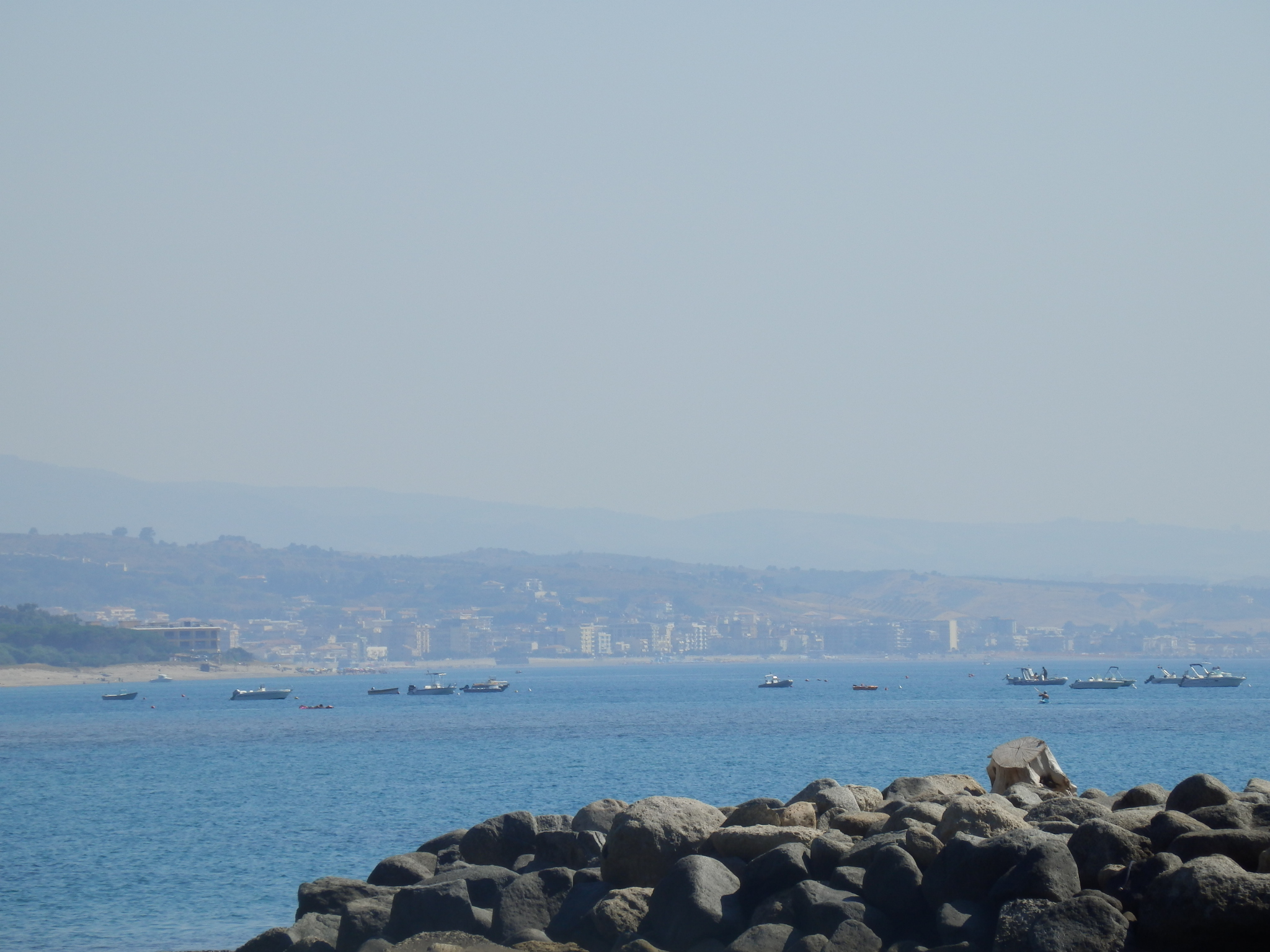
View of Catanzaro Lido from Copanello Lido beach

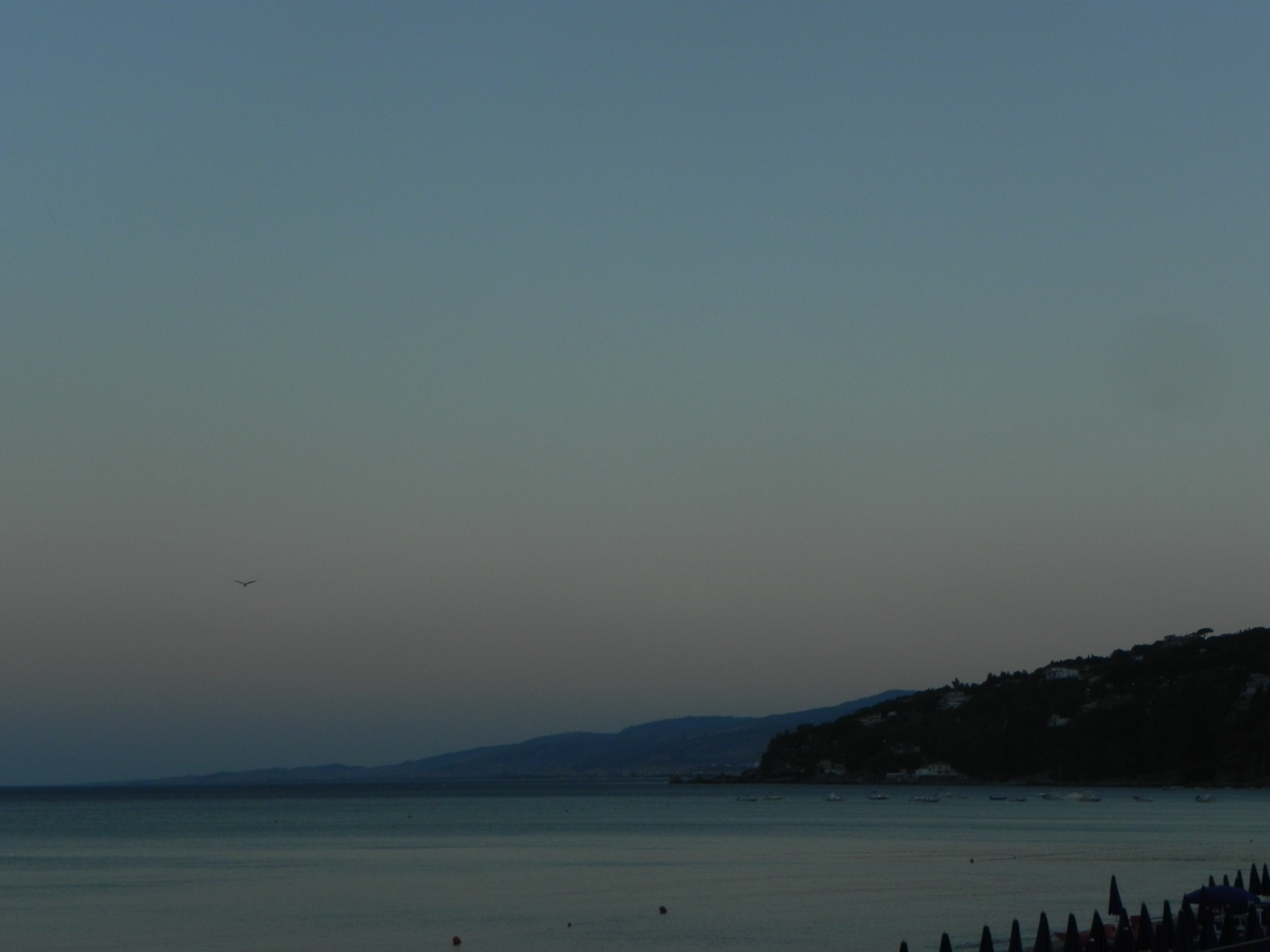
Panorama to Punta Stilo, with Copanello in the foreground

=== Hydrography ===
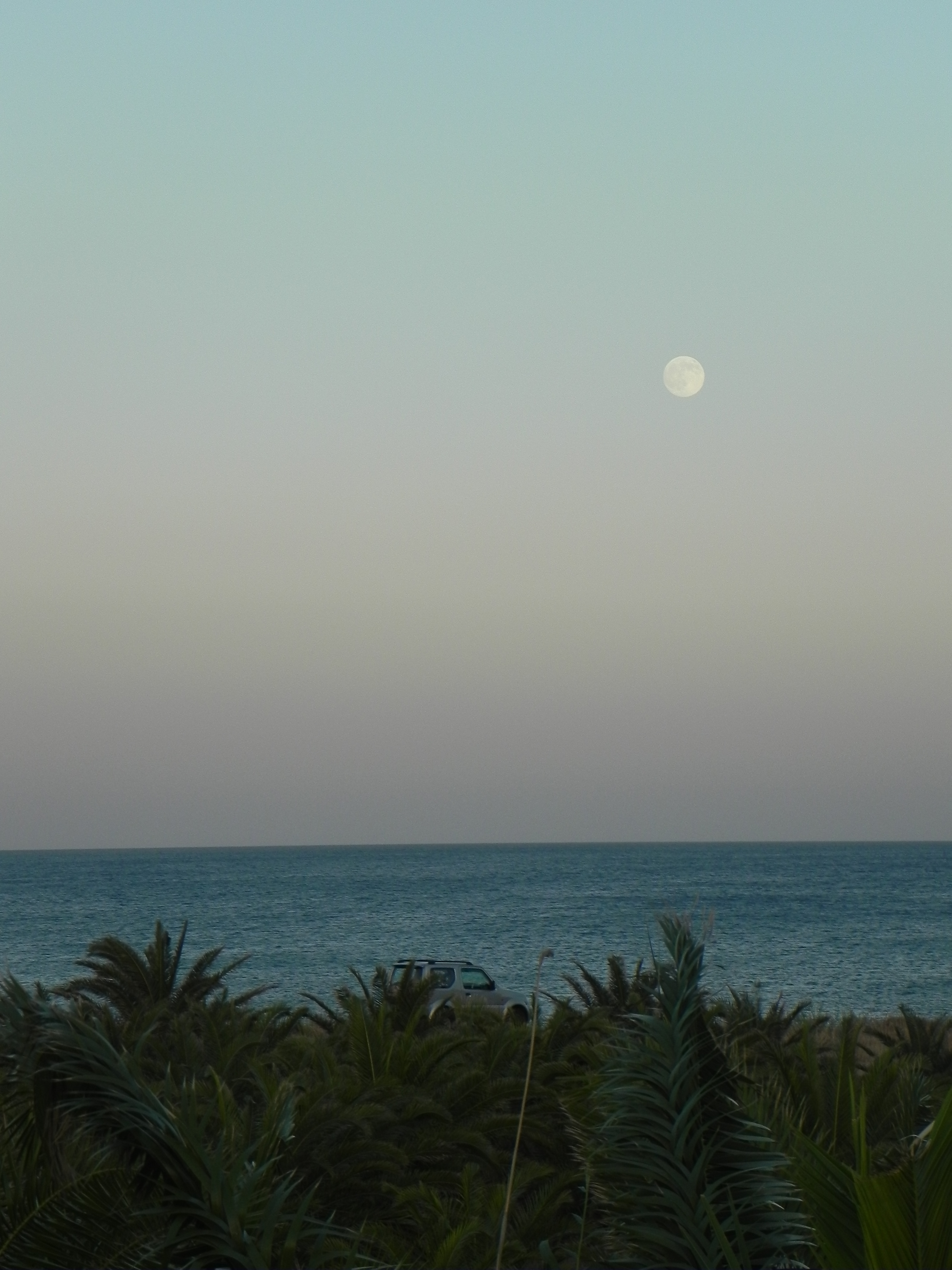
View of the palm grove near the mouth of the Alessi River

The River Alessi (known as Amnis Pellena in the 17th century) rises in the center of the isthmus of Catanzaro, in the municipality of Girifalco, at the foot of Mount Covello, part of the Serre Calabresi. It then flows through the municipality of Vallefiorita and on to the old town of Squillace, where it flows around the promontory before joining the Ghetterello to the south of the town. The torrent then crosses the northern part of the municipality of Stalettì before emptying into the Ionian Sea in the Gulf of Squillace. Its mouth forms the boundary between the frazione of Copanello, in the commune of Stalettì, and the frazione of Squillace Lido, in the commune of Squillace. It was here that Ulysses is said to have met Nausicaa on his voyage to the land of the Phaeacians. The Alessi torrent runs for a total of 18 kilometers from its source to its mouth.

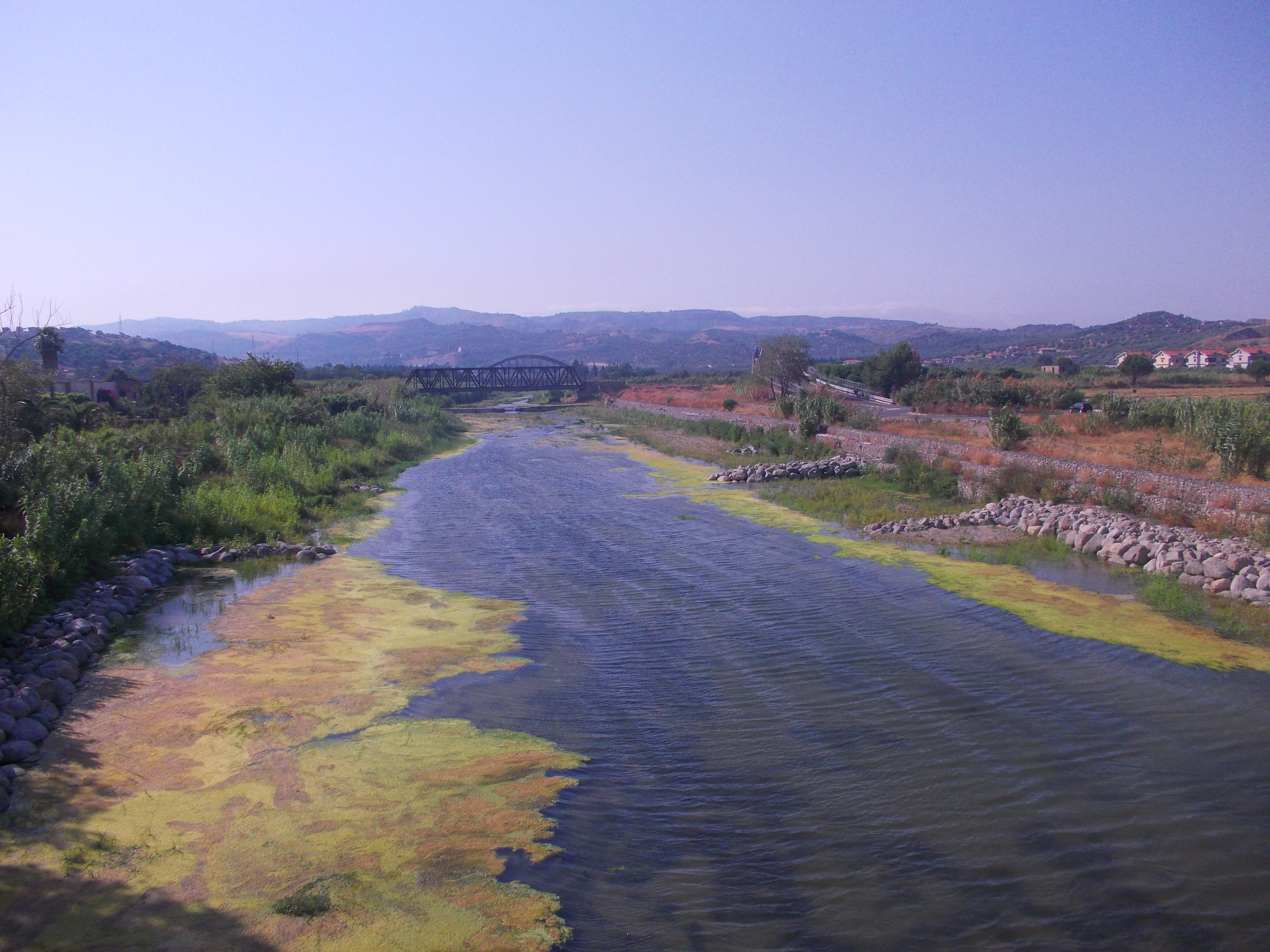
Alessi river in Copanello

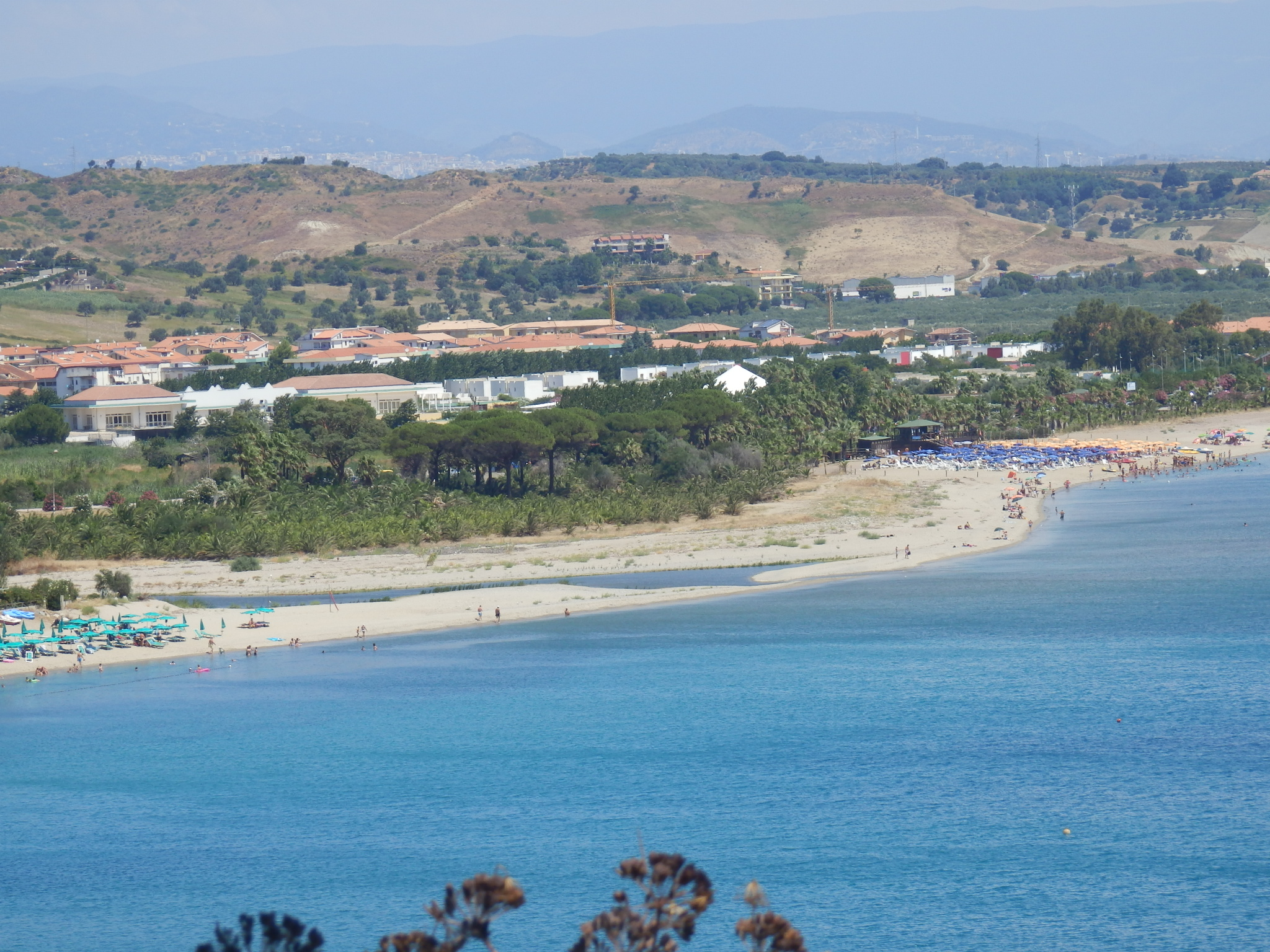
Mouth of the Alessi River

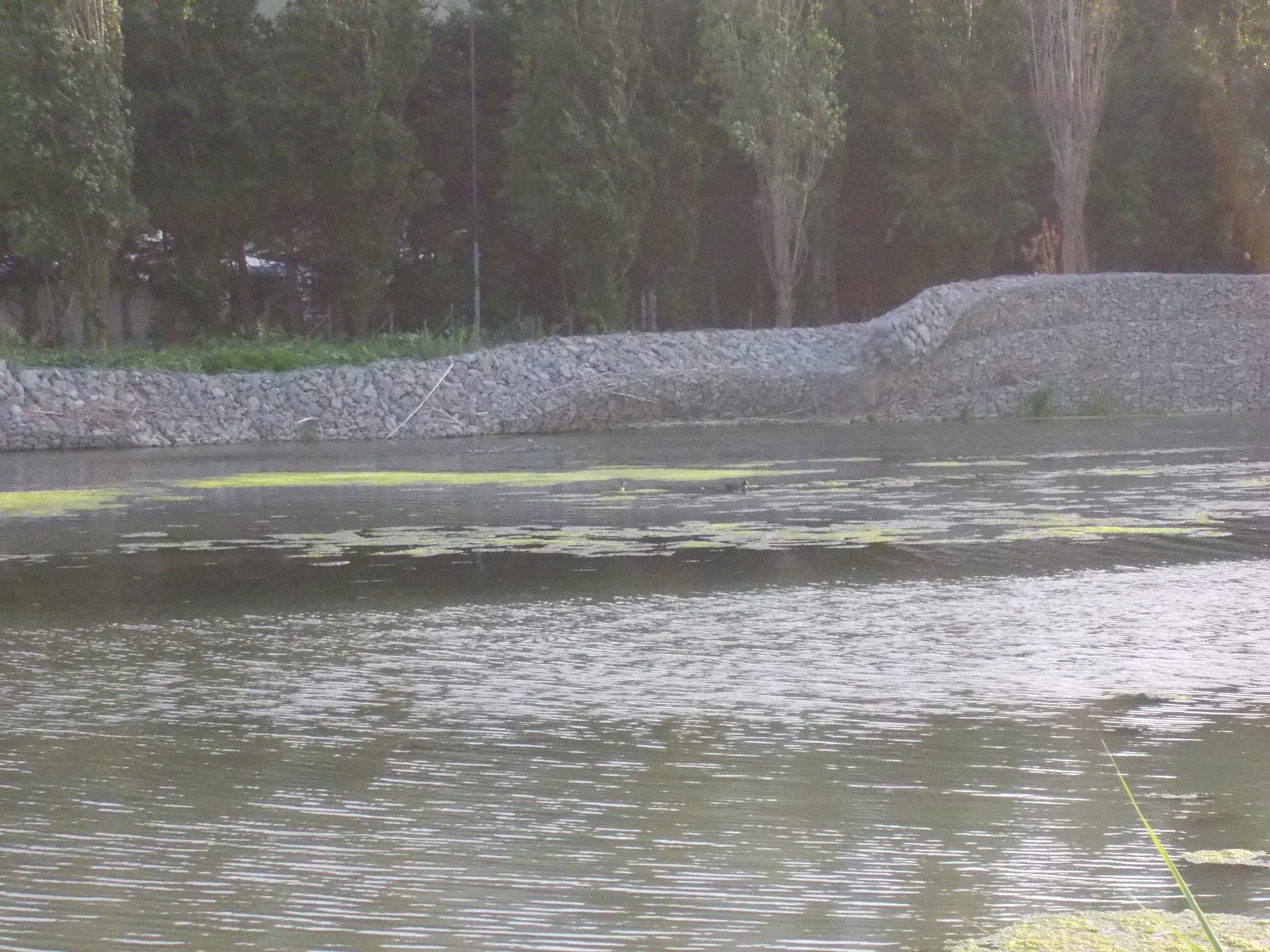
Torrent near the mouth at Copanello

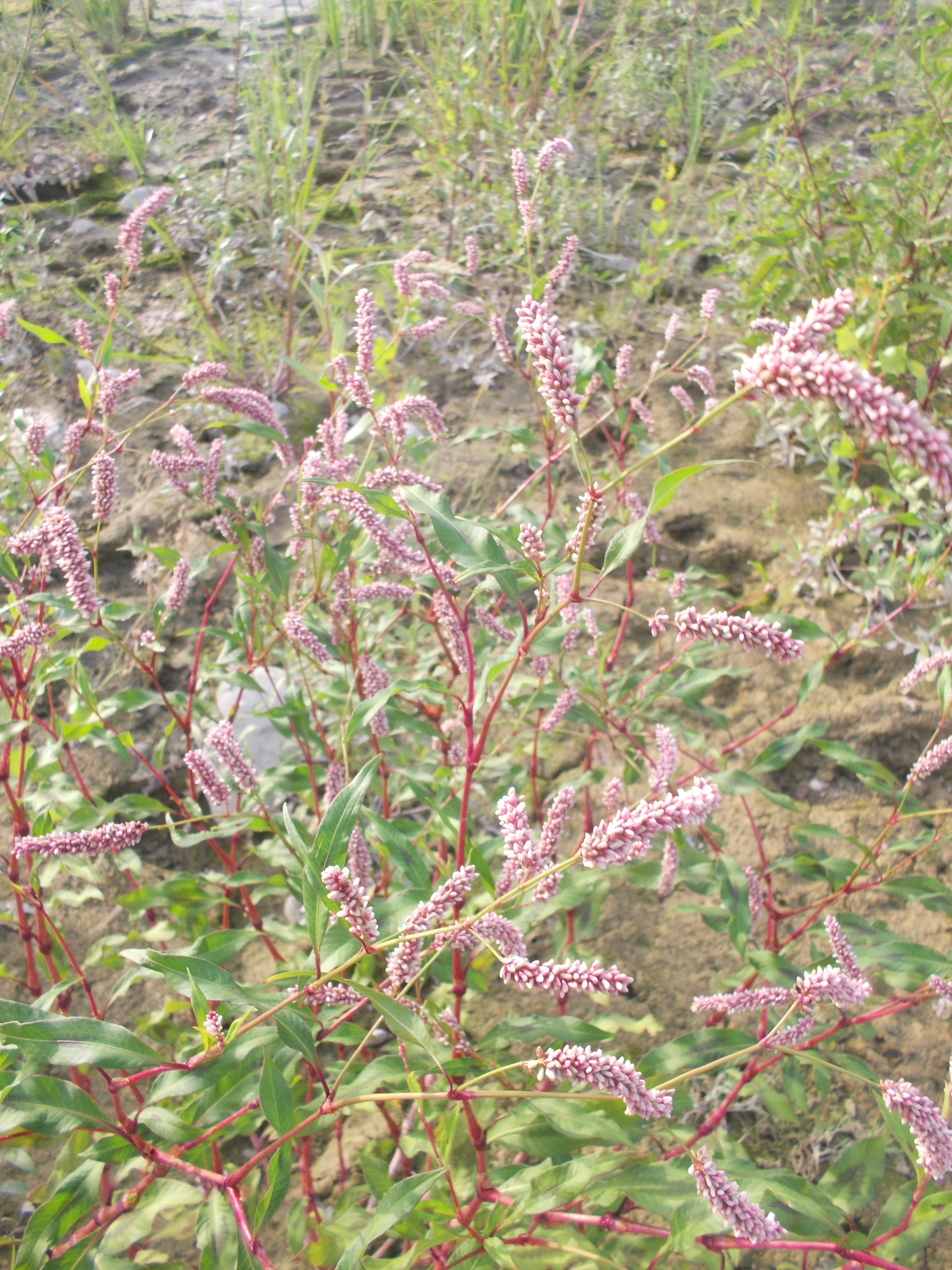
Persicaria on the Alessi river

In addition to the Alessi river, two other torrents run through Copanello Lido. These are the Fosso della Coscia (a tributary of the Alessi that flows between Villagio Guglielmo and the Guglielmo Caffè roasting plant) and the Fosso Gullà (a tributary of the Alessi that flows north of Casino Pepe). The Fosso della Coscia rises north of the town of Stalettì, while the Fosso Gullà begins in the area between the Casino Pepe and the town of Stalettì.

=== Fire risk ===
Fires are fairly frequent in the Coscia de Stalettì area between Copanello and the village of Stalettì.

In 2009, in the Coscia de Stalettì area between Copanello Lido and Stalettì, a fire threatened some homes, but was extinguished by the national fire department.

In July 2012, the Copanello Lido pine forest, which roughly corresponds to the lower western part of the Coscia de Stalettì, caught fire. An investigation followed, giving credence to the theory of arson.

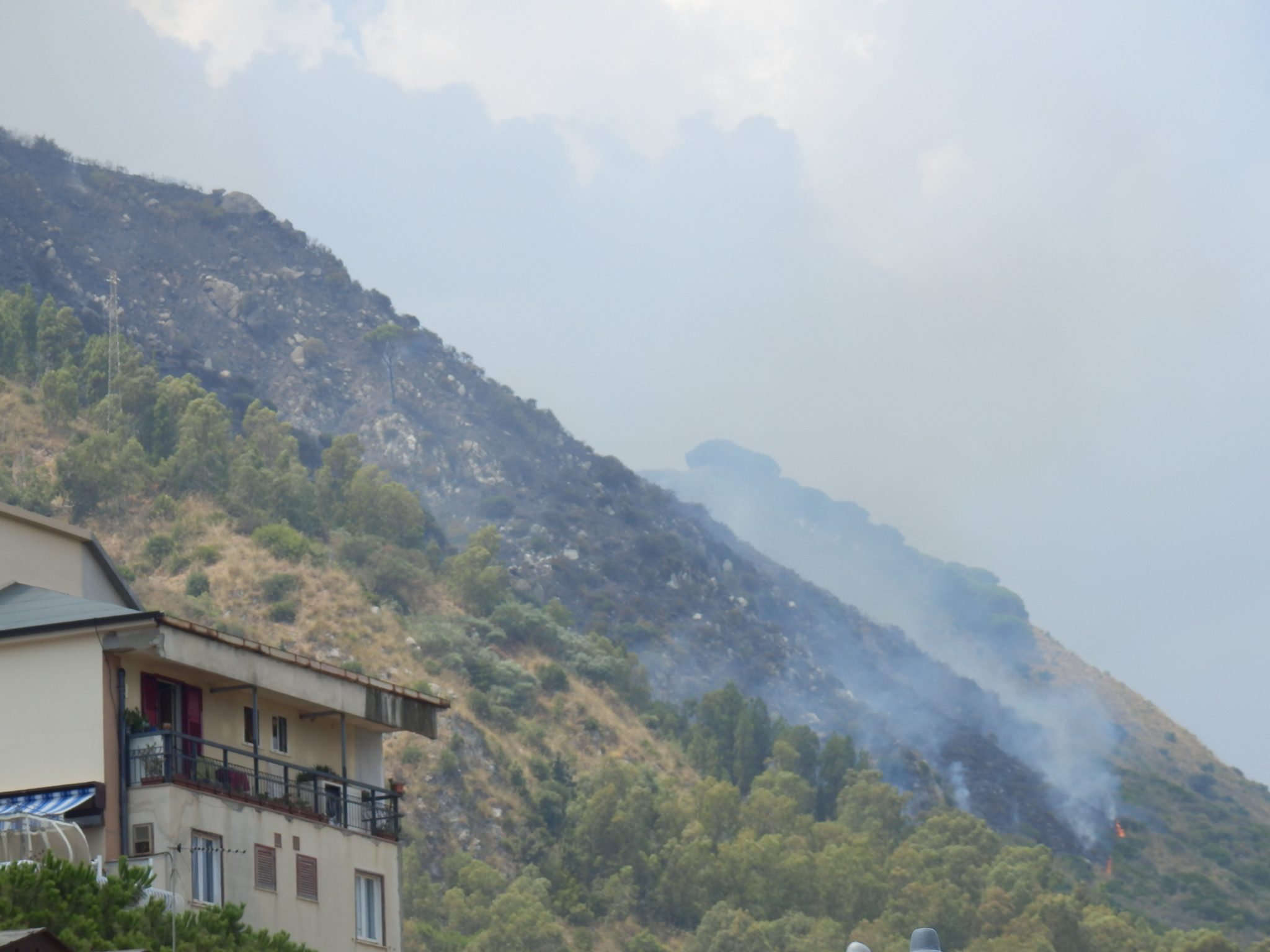
Fire at Copanello Lido on 23 July 2015

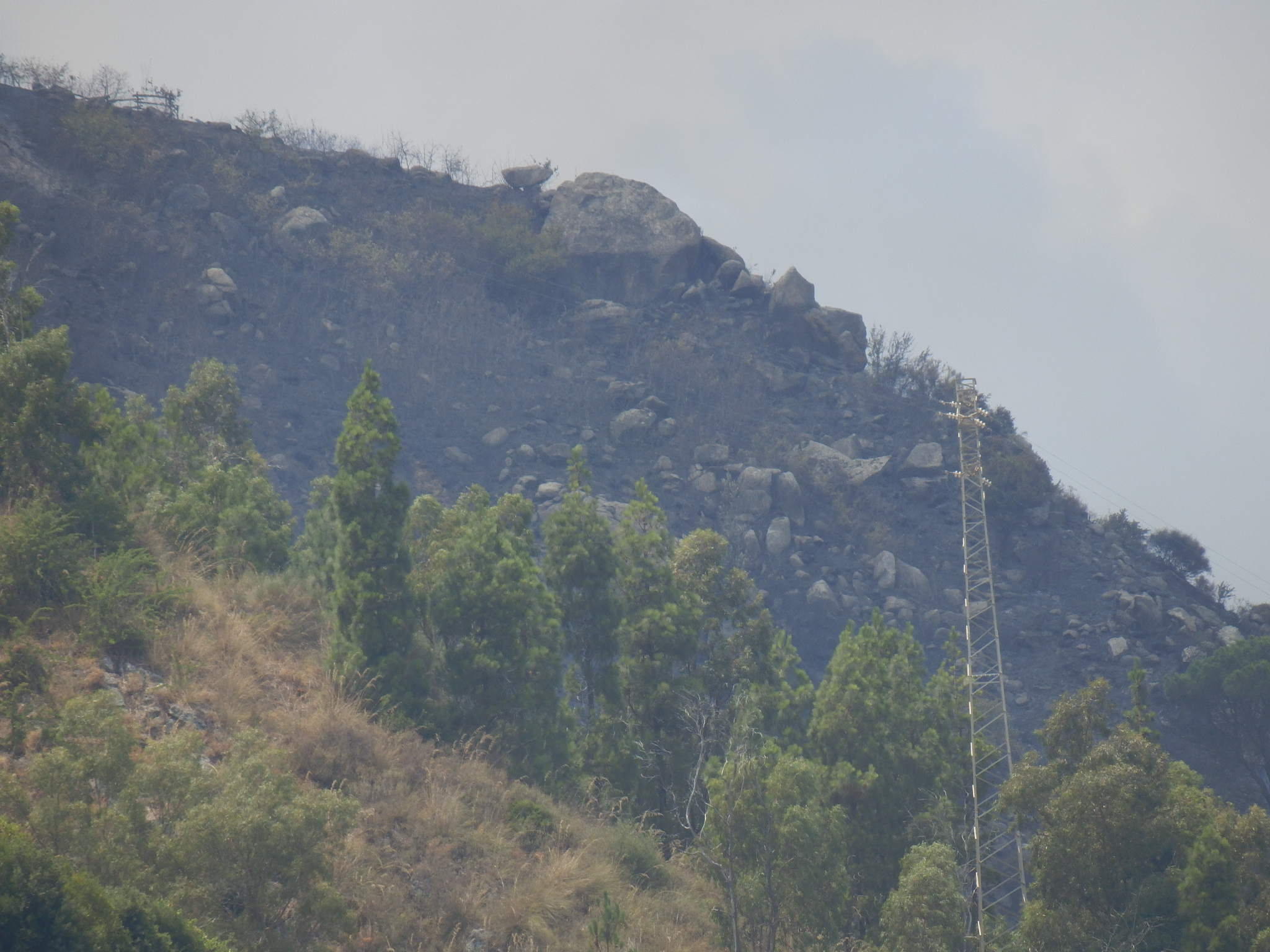
Burnt part of Stalettí Coscia

=== Urban planning ===
==== Copanello Alto ====
Copanello Alto can be reached via state highway 106 Jonica (the SS 106 Jonica), which crosses the frazione with Copanello Lido (in this case passing under Galleria de Stalettì) to the north and Santa Maria del Mare, then Caminia to the south. The other possible access route is the Strada Provinciale 52 (Provincial Route 52), which leads from the village of Stalettì to the north of Copanello Alto, and runs alongside the neighboring frazione of Torre Elena and Lucerta.

To the west of Copanello Alto, almost at the top of the Coscia di Stalettì, was another frazione now incorporated into that of Copanello, the Contrada di San Martino, so named because of its proximity to the Chapel of San Martino, built by Cassiodorus, although it is not directly located in the contrada. In fact, the Chapel of San Martino is located in the Lopilato locality, in the eastern part of Copanello Alto, almost at the foot of the Coscia di Stalettì.

==== Copanello Lido ====
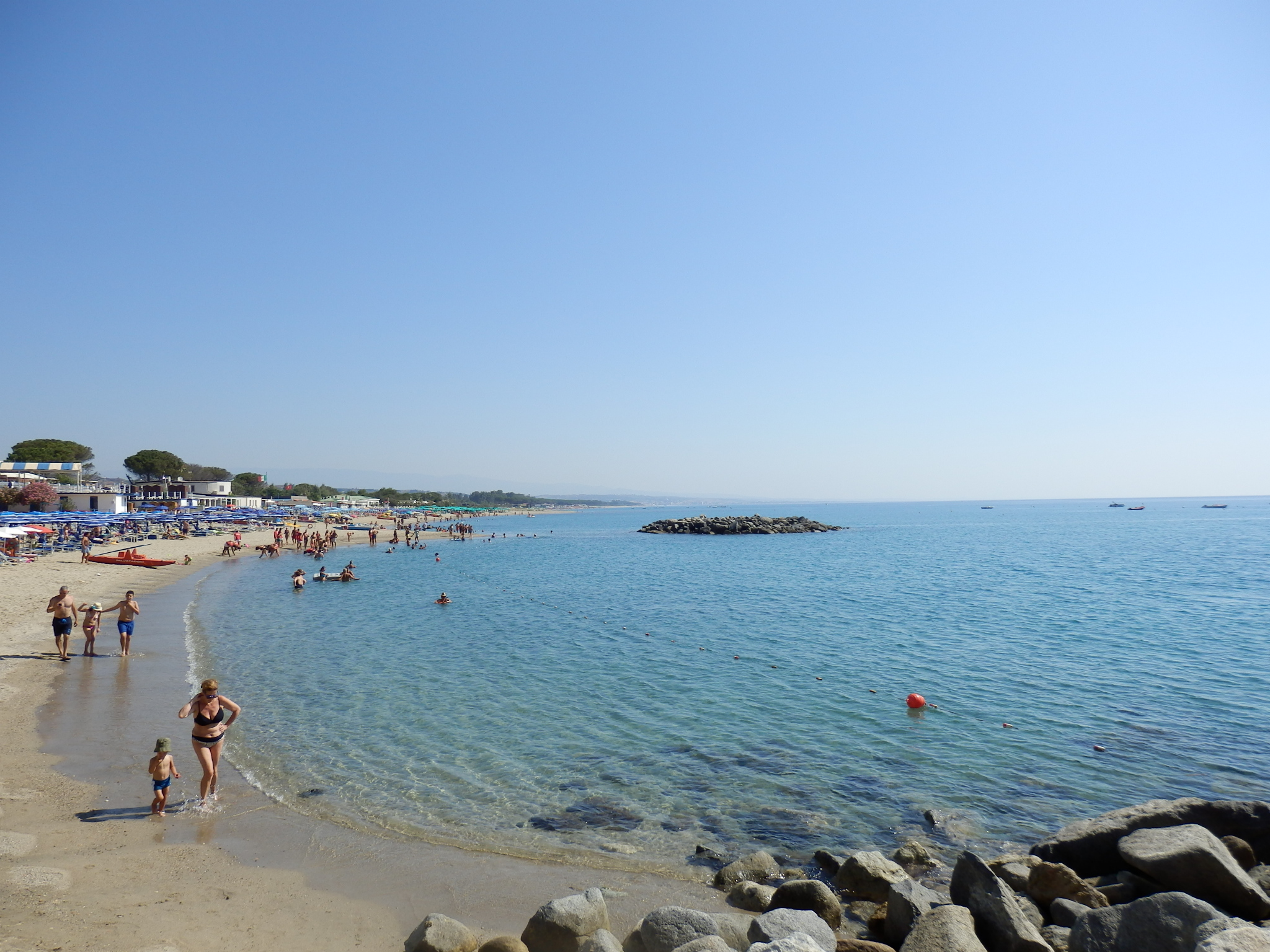
Copanello Lido beach

The Copanello Lido frazione can be reached via two roads. The first is an exit from European route E90 which, at the frazione, passes under an old railroad line and leads to piazza Antonio Susanna in the southern part of Copanello. From piazza Susanna, three parallel streets rise in a straight line to the north, forming the center of the hamlet. These three streets are (from west to east): via Lucifero, via Cassiodoro and via Lido, which runs alongside the beach. After 200 meters, via Lucifero and via Lido come to an end, giving way to the new residential area built since the 1990s.

The second access road to Copanello lies to the north of the frazione, following on from via Cassiodoro. It crosses a bridge over the Alessi torrent, just before its mouth, and arrives in the municipality of Squillace, from where it is possible to take the state highway 106 Jonica.

The average altitude of Copanello Lido is 9 meters.

==== Crime ====
On 13 June 2014, at 1:30 am, a bomb exploded outside the entrance to the Villagio Guglielmo restaurant in Piazza Susanna. The bomb was home-made using gunpowder and a fuse. Although the explosion caused no injuries, as the 300 Russian tourists dining there had left a few hours earlier, it did cause extensive material damage to the restaurant's facade (the iron curtain, windows and lampposts were destroyed).

The explosion was part of a series of Mafia intimidations directed at Daniele Rossi and Matteo Tubertini, co-presidents of Guglielmo Caffè and owners of Villagio Guglielmo. In August 2012, two of the company's trucks were deliberately set on fire in the parking lot of the roasting plant west of Copanello.

The Carabinieri of the nearby town of Soverato were initially in charge of the investigation, before it was transferred to the Anti-Mafia Investigation Department of the Province of Catanzaro. At the same time, Daniele Rossi hired a large number of workers, and the restaurant was completely repaired in less than a morning.

Reactions to the incident were numerous, mainly from Italian center-left political figures (almost all affiliated to the Democratic Party): Ernesto Magorno (MP and mayor of Diamante), Enzo Bruno (president of the Province of Catanzaro since 2014), Wanda Ferro (president of the Province of Catanzaro from 2008 to 2014), Antonella Stasi (president of the Calabria region), Sergio Abramo (mayor of Catanzaro), Agazio Loiero (minister from 1999 to 2001, president of the Calabria region from 2005 to 2008, senator and MP) and Mario Maiolo (vice-president of the Province of Cosenza).

== History ==
=== Mythology ===
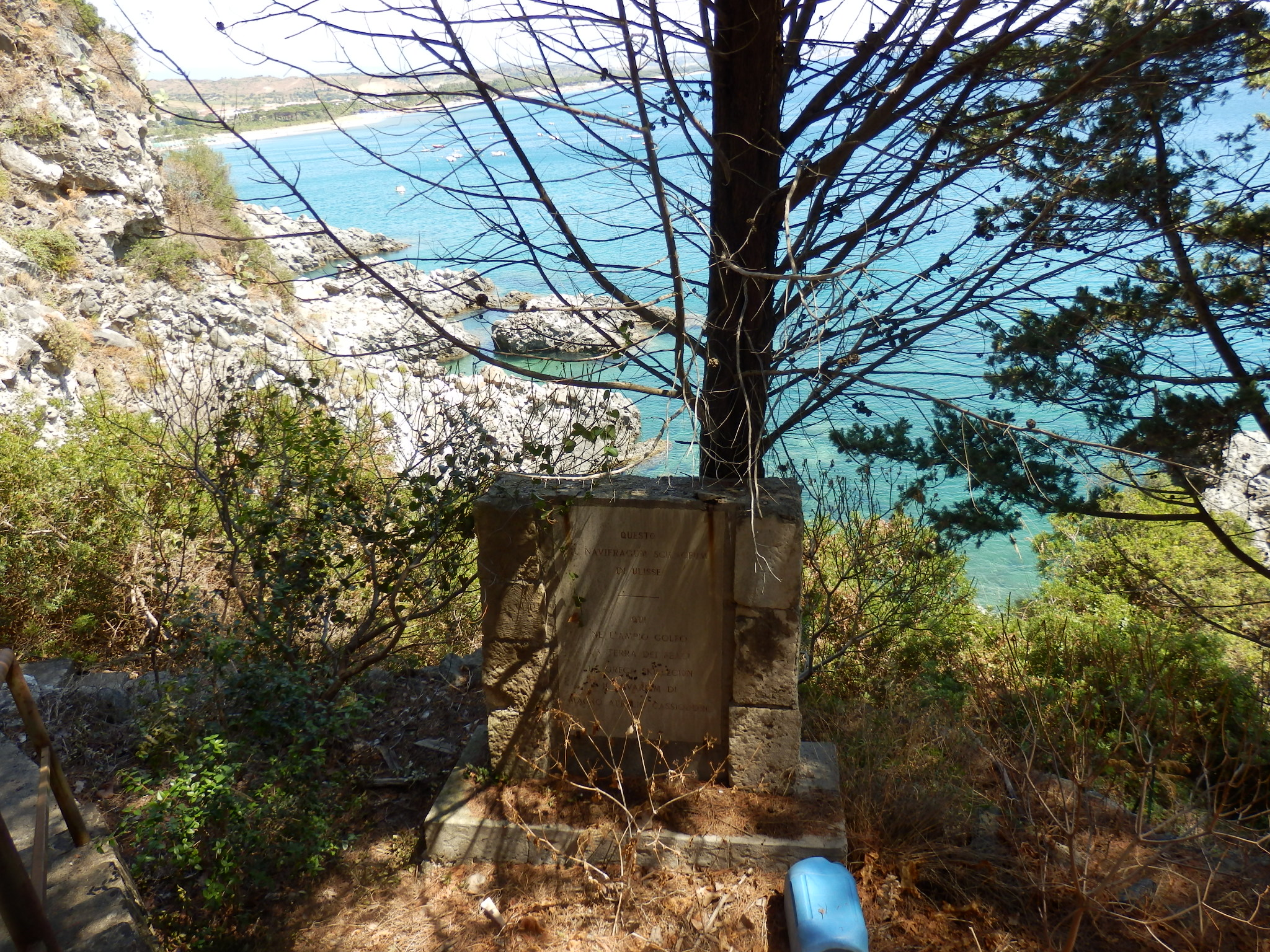
Stele in Copanello Alto in honor of Ulysses' sinking

One of the first to locate the land of the Phaeacians, Scheria, in the vicinity of Copanello was the Latin writer and politician Cassiodorus (485–580), who attributed the founding of the city of Squillace to Ulysses on his arrival in the land of the Phaeacians.

Another hypothesis, relayed by oral tradition and based on Cassiodorus' accounts, was taken up by Enzo Gatti in his book Odisseo, published in 1975. According to Gatti, Ulysses was stranded in the Gulf of Squillace, at the mouth of the river Alessi (which today forms the border between the frazione of Copanello Lido, in the municipality of Stalettì, and the frazione of Squillace Lido, in the municipality of Squillace). There, he is said to have met Nausicaa, who led him to her father, King Alcinous, who would have resided, in this case, in the center of the isthmus of Catanzaro, perhaps in Tiriolo or closer to the Copanello coast.

This tradition has left its mark, especially in the toponymy of the area. Thus, the coast from Copanello to Catanzaro Lido is today called, among other things, Rivière de Nausicaa. The frazione of Squillace Lido has named most of its streets after the Ulysses, such as Via dei Feaci, Via Laerte, Via Itaca, Via Telemaco and Lungomare Ulisse.

A stele commemorating the Vivarium monastery of Cassiodoro, the reign of the Phaeacians and the arrival of Ulysses has been erected at Copanello Alto, near Vasche de Cassiodoro.

=== From prehistory to the Middle Ages ===
==== Copanello Alto ====
Copanello Alto may have been inhabited in prehistoric times, as testified by a statuette found in the early 20th century by farmers belonging to Baroness Elvira Marincola Cattaneo.

The history of Copanello Alto from ancient times is inextricably linked with that of the Greek and Roman city of Scolacium, and later with that of the town of Squillace. Indeed, the first to settle here was the Latin politician and writer Cassiodorus (born in 485 in the nearby town of Scolacium and died in 580), who built the Vivarium monastery and Chapel of San Martino in 555, as well as fishponds for aquaculture (the Vasche di Cassiodoro, Vasche di Copanello or simply Vasche). Both Copanello Alto and Copanello Lido had belonged to the Cassiodoro family.

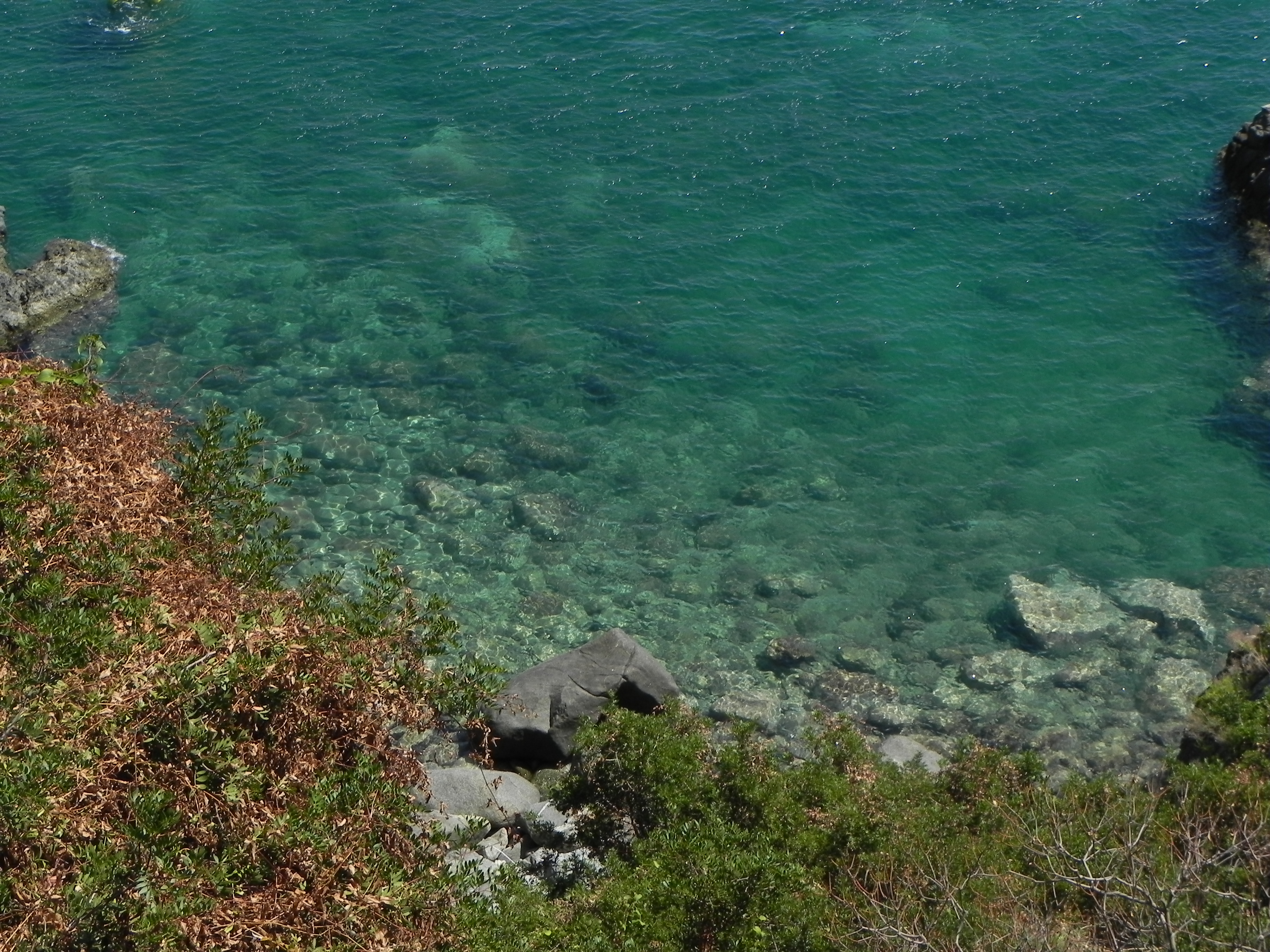
Water at Vasche di Cassiodoro

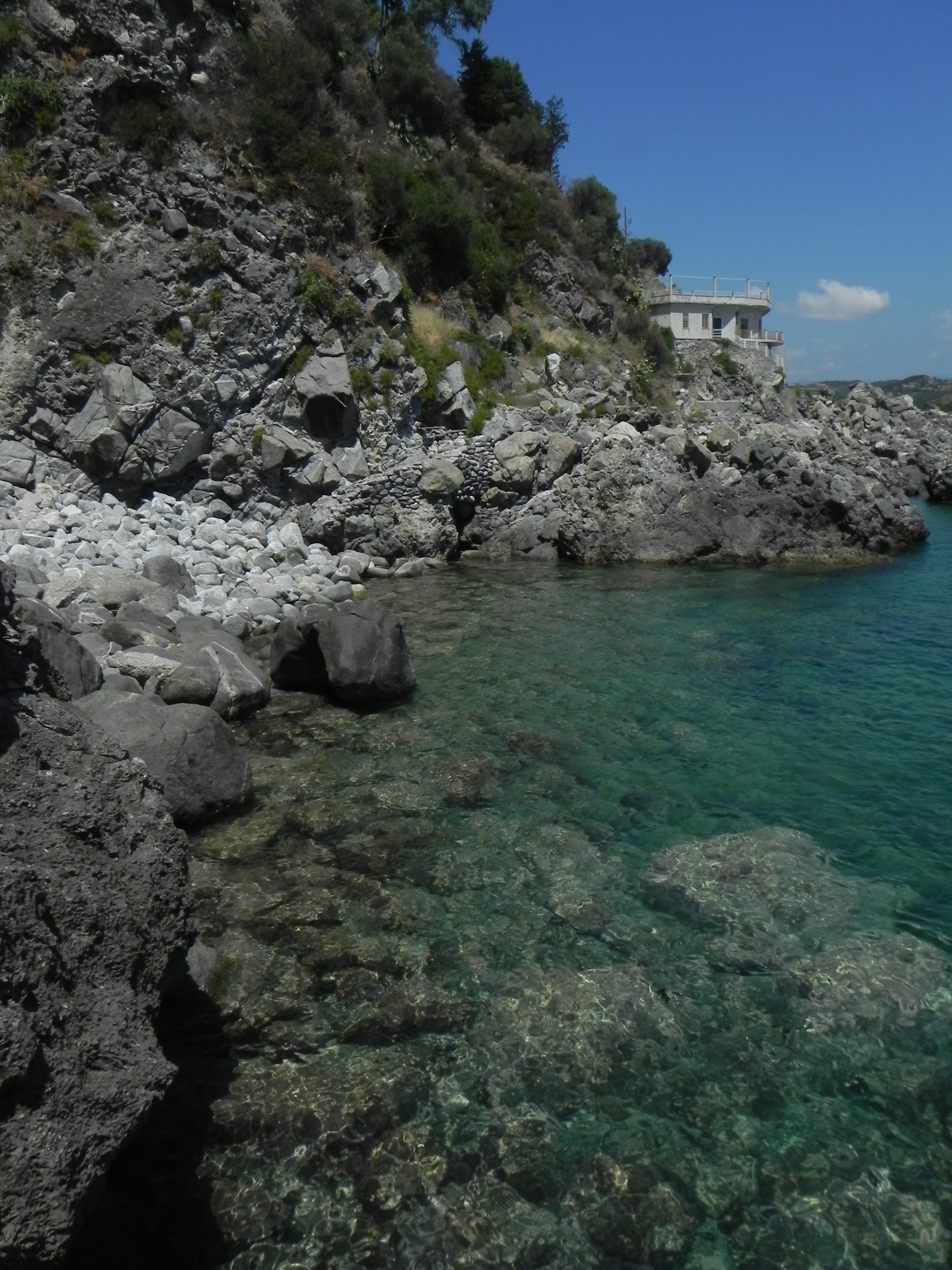
Les Vasche et la Coscia di Staletti

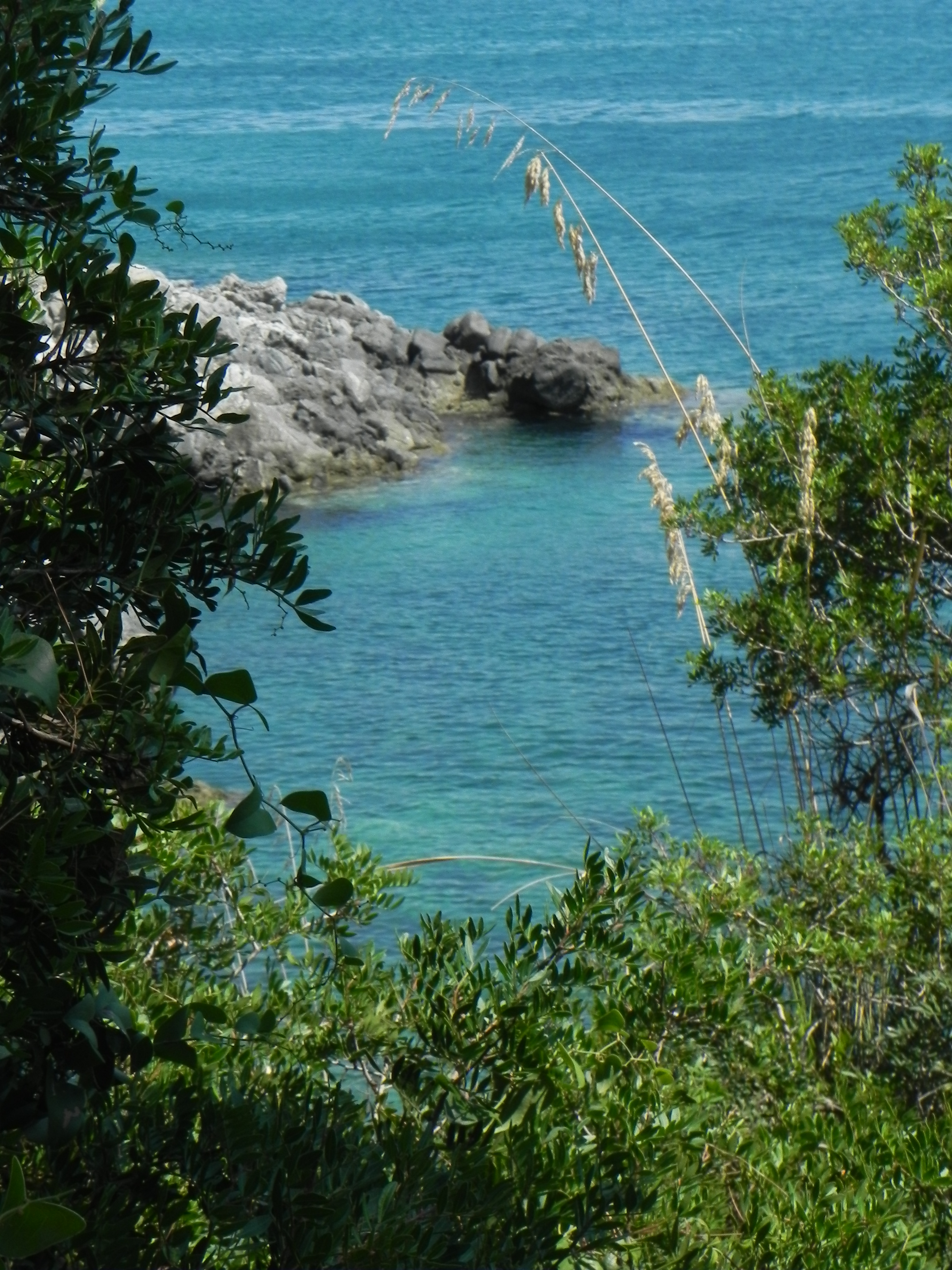
Les Vasche from Libero Gatti's pine forest.

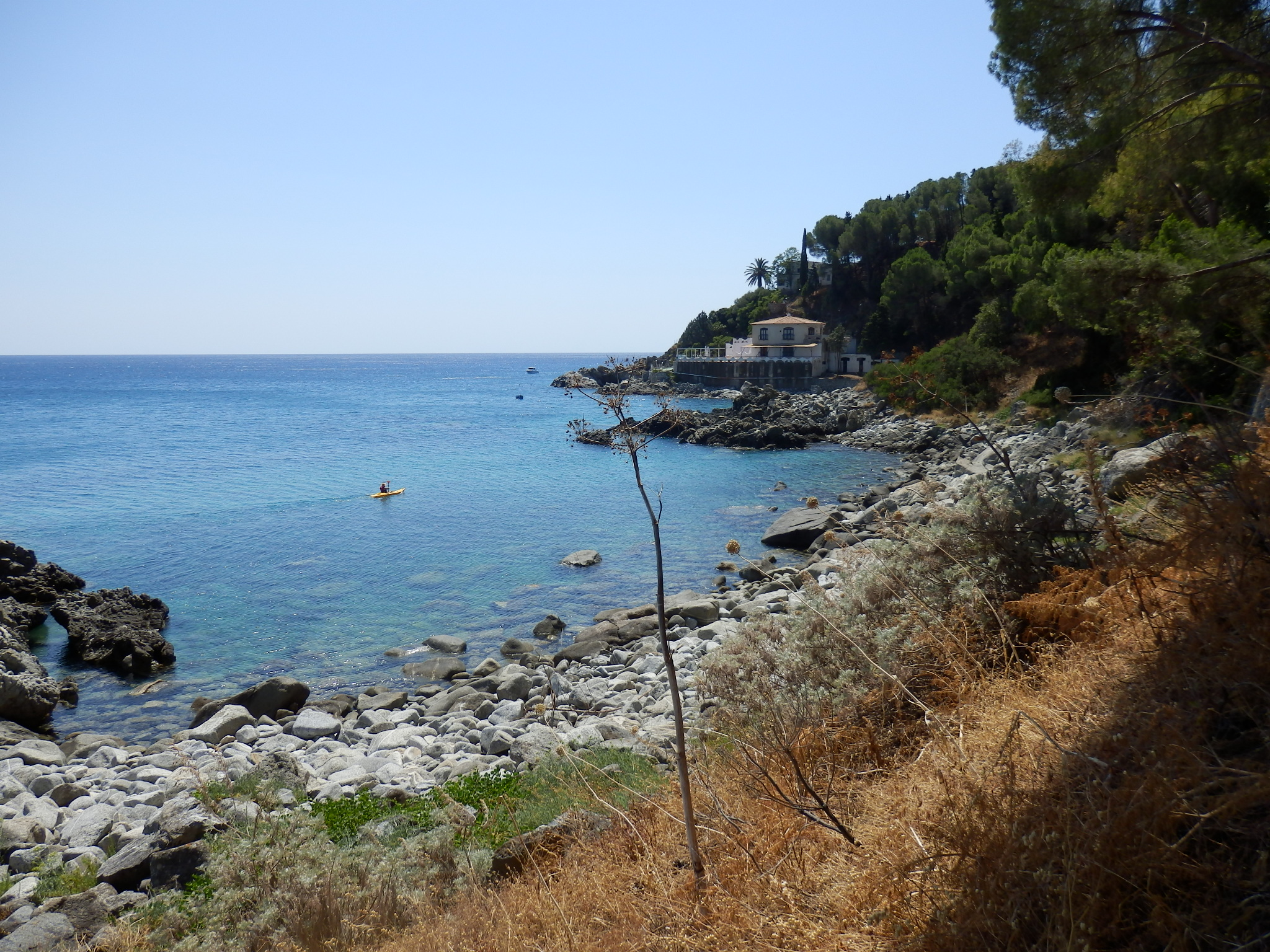
Le Bilbo with les Vasche in the foreground

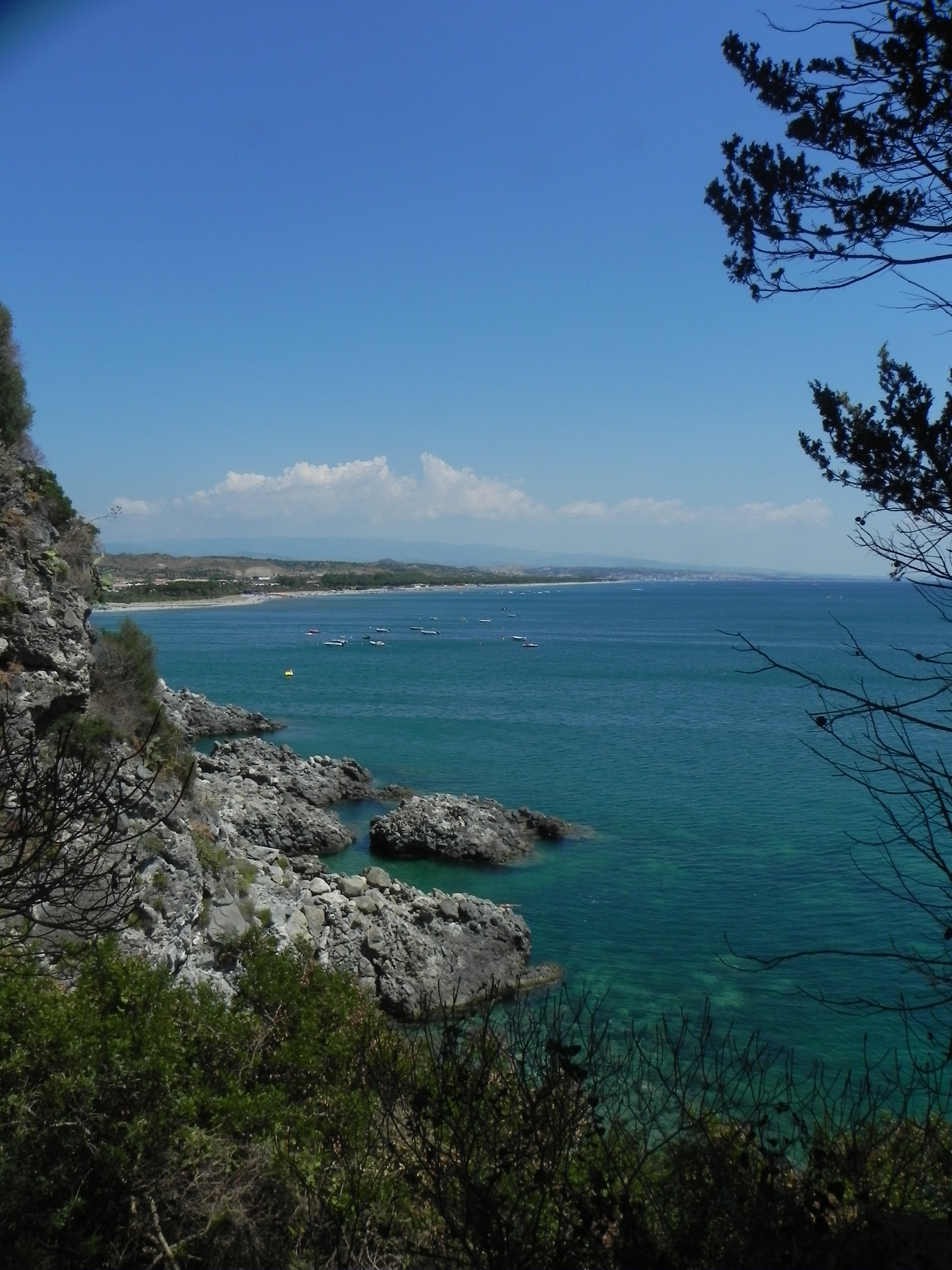
Les Vasche and Squillace Lido from the former Copanello Motel

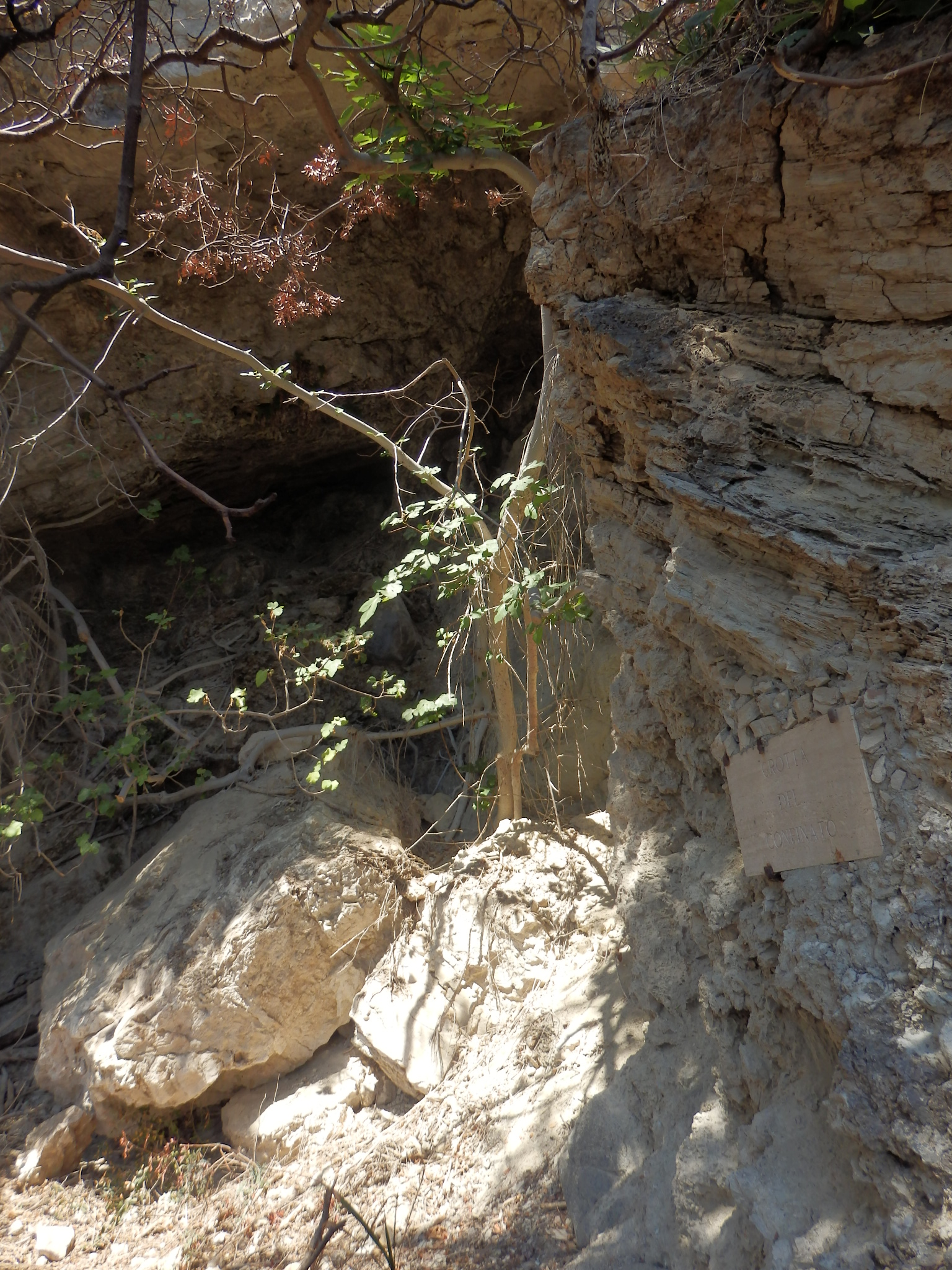
The Grotta del Confinato.

At the end of the 7th century, the caves at the foot of the promontory on which Copanello Alto stands were occupied by Basilian monks and hermits from the Middle East who had fled to southern Italy following the iconoclastic edicts of the Byzantine Emperor Leo III the Isaurian. Among these caves is Grotta del Confinato, located in the former botanical garden of the museum opened by Libero Gatti in 1991.

On his death around 580, Cassiodorus bequeathed his possessions, including the Vivarium monastery and thus the territory of Copanello, to the monks of the Monastère Castellense, located in Santa Maria del Mare (frazione de Stalettì). The monastery remained in their possession until the 11th century, although the bishop of Squillace attempted to seize it on several occasions, at which time it came under the control of the Benedictine Abbey of the Most Holy Trinity of Mileto, as a gift from Count Roger I of Sicily. In the 13th century, although still owned by the Abbey of Mileto, the monastery of Vivarium and the lands of Copanello became part of the town of Squillace.

In the 16th century, Copanello regularly suffered Saracen incursions, and the remains of the Vivarium monastery were used as a cavallara tower to protect the coast.

==== Copanello Lido ====
The Copanello Lido area has been inhabited since Neolithic times, with an ancient village located next to the mouth of the Alessi torrent.

In the 16th century, the area where Copanello Lido now stands was part of Cassiodorus' landholding, and was used for pasture and olive groves irrigated by the Alessi river.

Between the 16th and 18th centuries, a road called Via Grande (Main Street) was built to link Copanello Lido beach with the village of Stalettì. Built on the site of the ancient Roman road (also used in the Middle Ages) that ran along the Ionian coast near Catanzaro, it was called Viarande until 1943, when it became Via Rande and then Via Grande. It starts to the west of Copanello Lido, behind the Guglielmo Caffè roasting plant and at the foot of the Casino Pepe, and arrives in the village of Stalettì, where it serves as the village's main street. In some places, sections of the ancient Roman road can still be seen.

Until the end of the 18th century, the territory of Copanello Lido, known as La Coscia or simply Coscia, lay within the Marina de Squillace (Squillace coastline).

=== Modern times ===
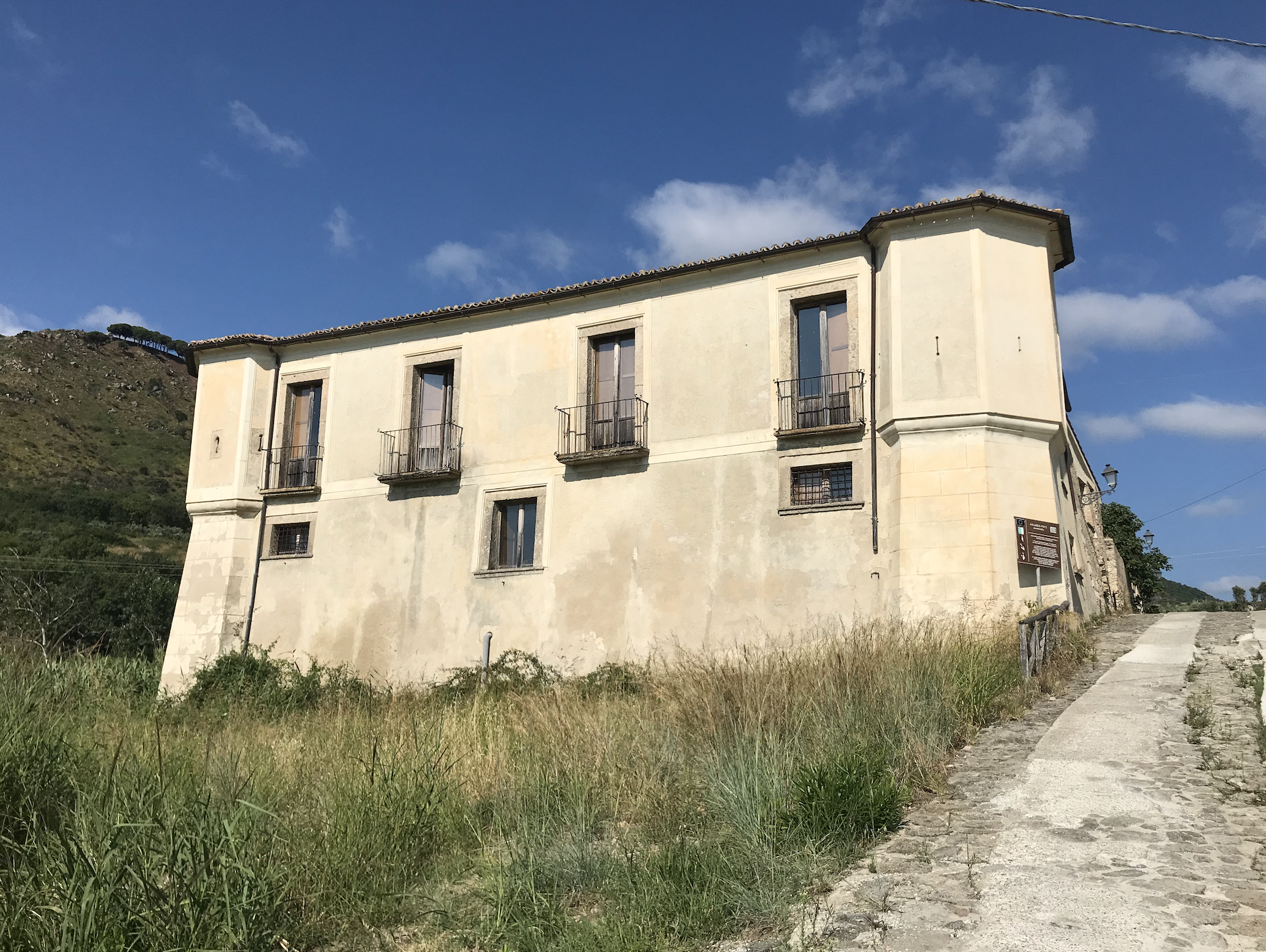
Le Palazzo ou Casino Pepe

Like the village of Stalettì, the lands of Copanello remained a Casale de Squillace (part of the town of Squillace) until the early 19th century, when Napoleon I's French seized the Kingdom of Naples from 1806 to 1815. From then on, Stalettì became a commune, encompassing the lands of Copanello Alto and Copanello Lido.

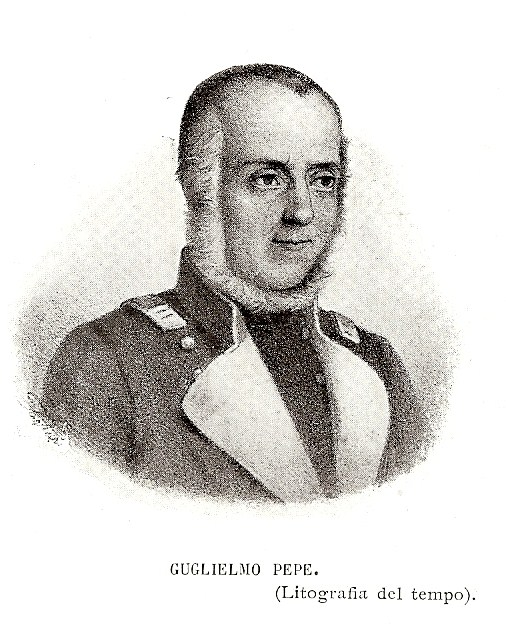
Guglielmo Pepe

In the 17th century, the owner of the territory now occupied by Copanello was the Pepe de Squillace family, who also owned the Casino Pepe (also called Palazzo Pepe because of its size, it was built in the 17th century), in the western part of Copanello Lido, adjacent to the Arethusa fountain mentioned by Cassiodorus. In the mid-1700s, Copanello was owned by don Giovanni Battista Pepe (b. May 1695), who married the noblewoman Rosa Soriano, from whom he had Gregorio Pepe in 1740. A few years later, don Gregorio Pepe inherited his father's lands, including Copanello. In 1761, he married Irene Assanti, with whom he had 22 children, including Stefano Pepe, Knight of Malta and Florestano, and Guglielmo Pepe, who became generals and patriots.

General and patriot Guglielmo Pepe (1783–1855) inherited a quarter of the Pepe family estates, including the territory of Copanello. He stayed there several times until the age of six, but only once as an adult, in 1817, to see his family, who were spending the summer there. He describes his family's property as stretching from the Alessi river to the foot of the Coscia di Stalettì, and specifies that Copanello is still called the Coscia. The land was then occupied by orange groves and pastures where some fifty cows, belonging to Ferdinand Pepe, grazed. Moreover, Guglielmo Pepe reported that the area was infested with bandits, and he himself had to surround himself with guards to ensure his safety. In 1818, the Honorable Kepell Crewe, brother of the Lord of Crewe, made a trip to Copanello Lido on Pepe land. Crewe drew on this experience for a book published in London in 1820.

In June 1851, Guglielmo Pepe donated the territory of Copanello (then called la Coscia) to his former soldiers and fr iends: politician Enrico Cosenz (1820–1898), Pepe's cousin Damiano Assanti (1809–1894), Francesco Carrano (1815–1890), Girolamo Calà Ulloa (1810–1891) and Camillo Boldoni (1815–1898). Gradually, Damiano Assanti and his brother Cosmo Assanti came to own the entire donation from Guglielmo Pepe. On 4 April 1854, they sold it to Baron Giuseppe Scoppa (1794–1857) for 53,500 ducats, although the latter was unable to pay the full amount, which led to two lawsuits between Scoppa's descendants and the Assanti-Pepe family, one in 1866 and the other in 1873.

Giuseppe Scoppa, now master of Copanello, married Saveria Greco, with whom he had several daughters, including the future Baroness Enrichetta Scoppa, Luisa Scoppa and Alfonsa Scoppa. On her death in 1857, Enrichetta Scoppa (1831–1910) became the last heiress of the Scoppa family. She thus gave her name to the promontory on which Copanello Alto now stands, the Coscia di Stalettì, also known as Coscia della baronnessa (Baroness's Thigh). In the mid-1860s, she sold the territory of Copanello Alto to Achille Fazzari, then bequeathed the remainder, i.e. today's Copanello Lido, to her niece Antonietta Enrichetta di Francia (daughter of Marquis Francesco di Francia of Santa Caterina dello Ionio and his sister Alfonsa Scoppa), future wife of Armando Lucifero.

In the 1880s, more celebrities such as French novelist Anne Levinck visited Copanello, then La Coscia, following in the footsteps of Cassiodorus and general Guglielmo Pepe. The latter visited the area on numerous occasions, and drew on this experience for an article entitled En Calabre, published in 1889 in the Geography Magazine.

=== From the 20th century to today ===
==== Copanello Alto ====
In the 1860s, colonel and deputy Achille Fazzari, a native of Stalettì, purchased the remains of the Vivarium monastery in Copanello Alto from Baroness Enrichetta Scoppa and transformed it. He added two wings to the building and three courtyards, where he built large machines for extracting olive oil. Indeed, Achille Fazzari had been trading olive oil in association with Nicola Cricelli. The bottles were then transported to Catanzaro Lido, from where they were shipped by steamboat to Trieste, then part of the Austrian Empire. After a few years, the emergence of industrial olive oil factories rendered the plant totally useless. Fazzari called on Florentine architect Federico Andreotti (who had already built the Palazzo Fazzari in Catanzaro between 1870 and 1874) to transform the building into a summer residence for himself and his family, the Casa Fazzari.

In 1868, Achille Fazzari joined forces with Luigi Caruso and Menotti Garibaldi to supervise the construction of a tunnel through the Coscia di Stalettì: the Galleria di Stalettì. This tunnel linked Copanello Alto (and thus the towns of Stalettì, Montauro and the entire coast to the south) to the territory of today's Copanello Lido (from where the road led to Squillace and Catanzaro). This tunnel, which is still in use today and through which the state highway 106 Jonica passes, had been built on land belonging to the Fazzari, and compensation was paid to him the following year.

In 1882, Giuseppe Garibaldi spent a night at Achille Fazzari's house. On the occasion of the fiftieth anniversary of Achille Fazzari's death, a stele was erected to commemorate this visit. Achille Fazzari died on the night of 19 and 20 November 1910, in the same house in Copanello Alto. At the time, the Fazzari family owned the entire promontory on which Copanello Alto now stands.

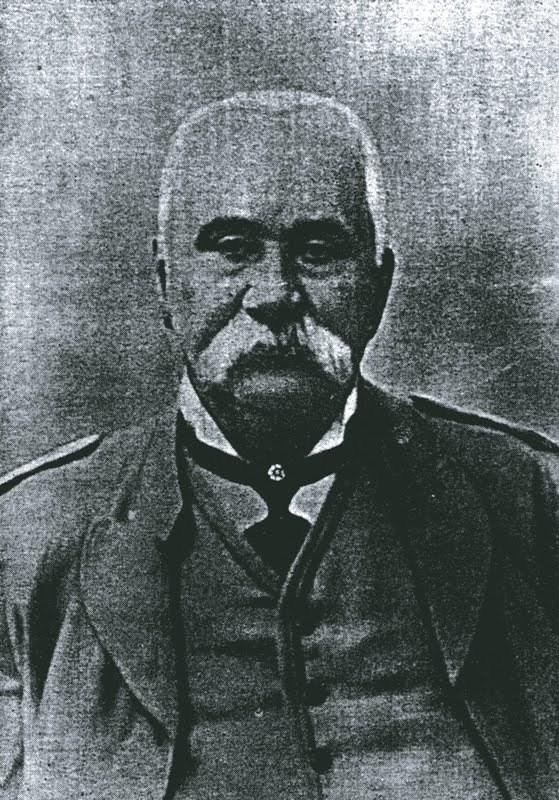
Achille Fazzari

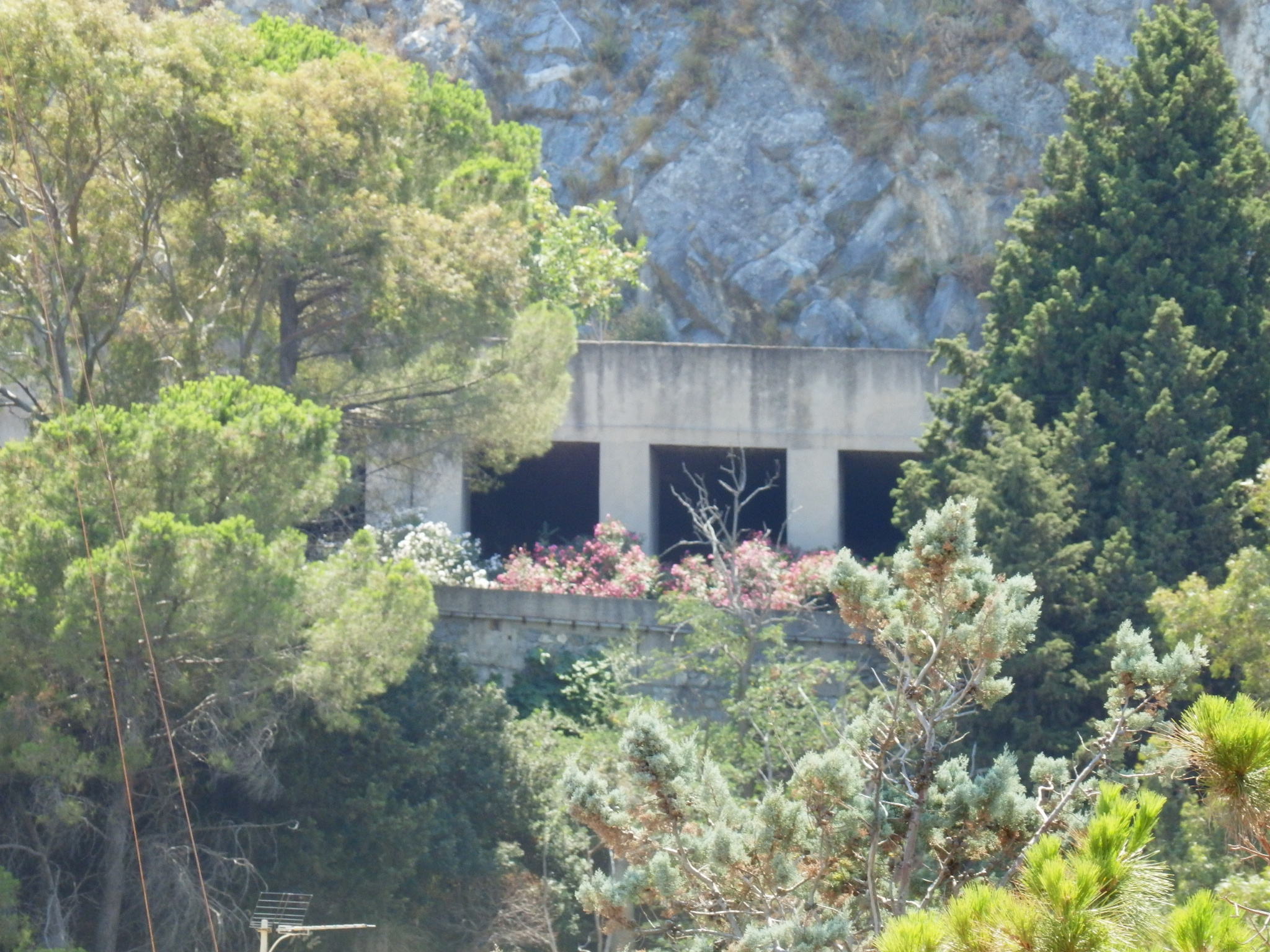
Galleria di Staletti

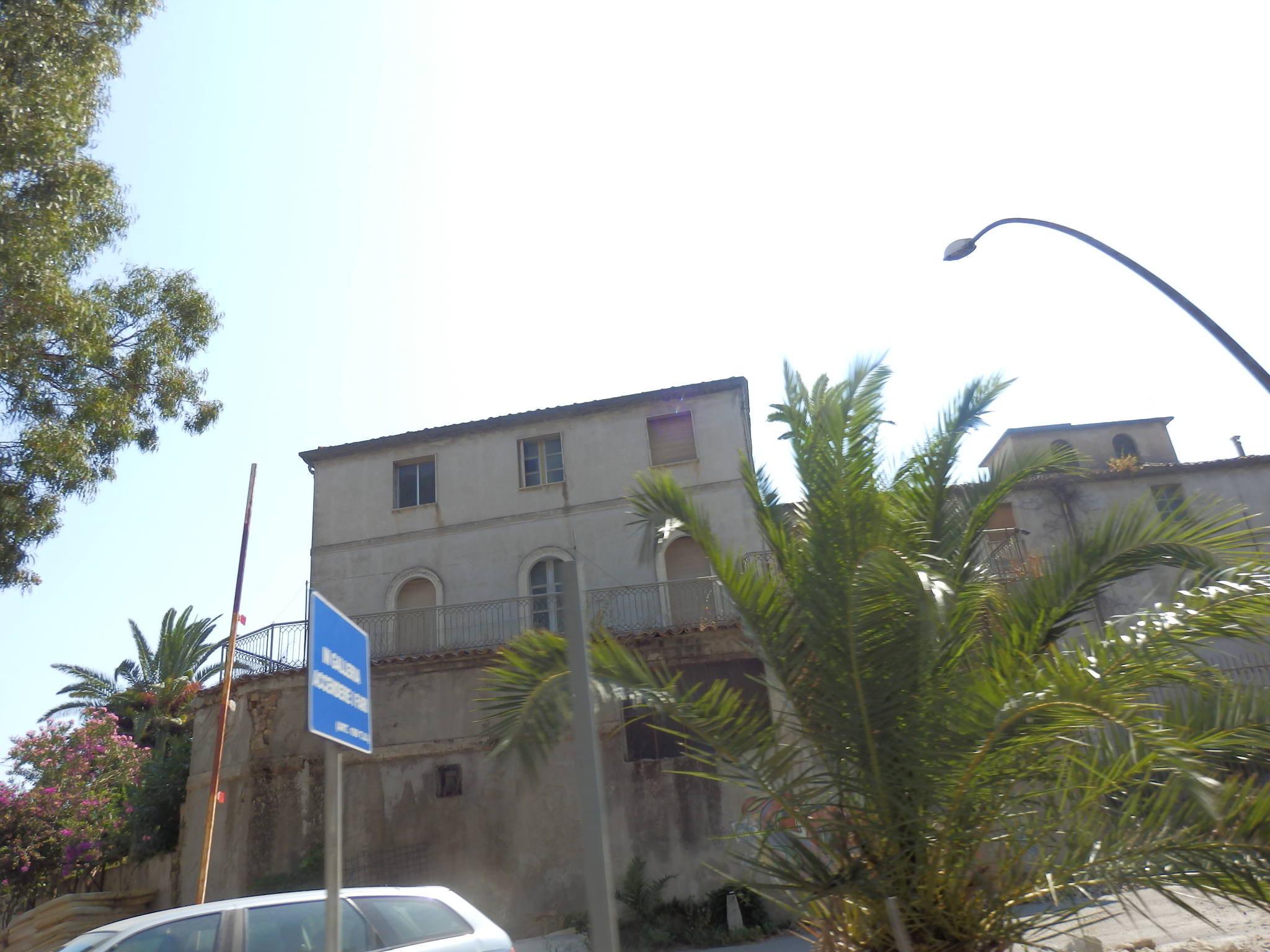
Casa Fazzari

In 1897, the English writer George Gissing (1857–1903) travelled to the Ionian coast in search of the sites of ancient Magna Graecia, from which he drew a novel, By the Ionian Sea, published in 1901, in which the Copanello territory is mentioned in the chapter on the town of Squillace and Cassiodorus.

In 1927, Achille Fazzari's descendants sold the territory of Copanello Alto to Giuseppe Falcone (a piazza was named in his honor, the Piazzetta Giuseppe Falcone), who married Baroness Elvira Marincola Cattaneo in 1929 (the latter was Mayor of Stalettì from 1955 to 1964). In 1935, Giuseppe Falcone died, leaving his entire estate, including Copanello Alto, to his son (whom he had inherited from Baroness Marincola Cattaneo in 1930), Giovanni II Falcone. In 1937, Baroness Elvira Marincola Cattaneo remarried Giovanni Gatti, an anarchist political exile from Modena, and they had a son, Libero Gatti.

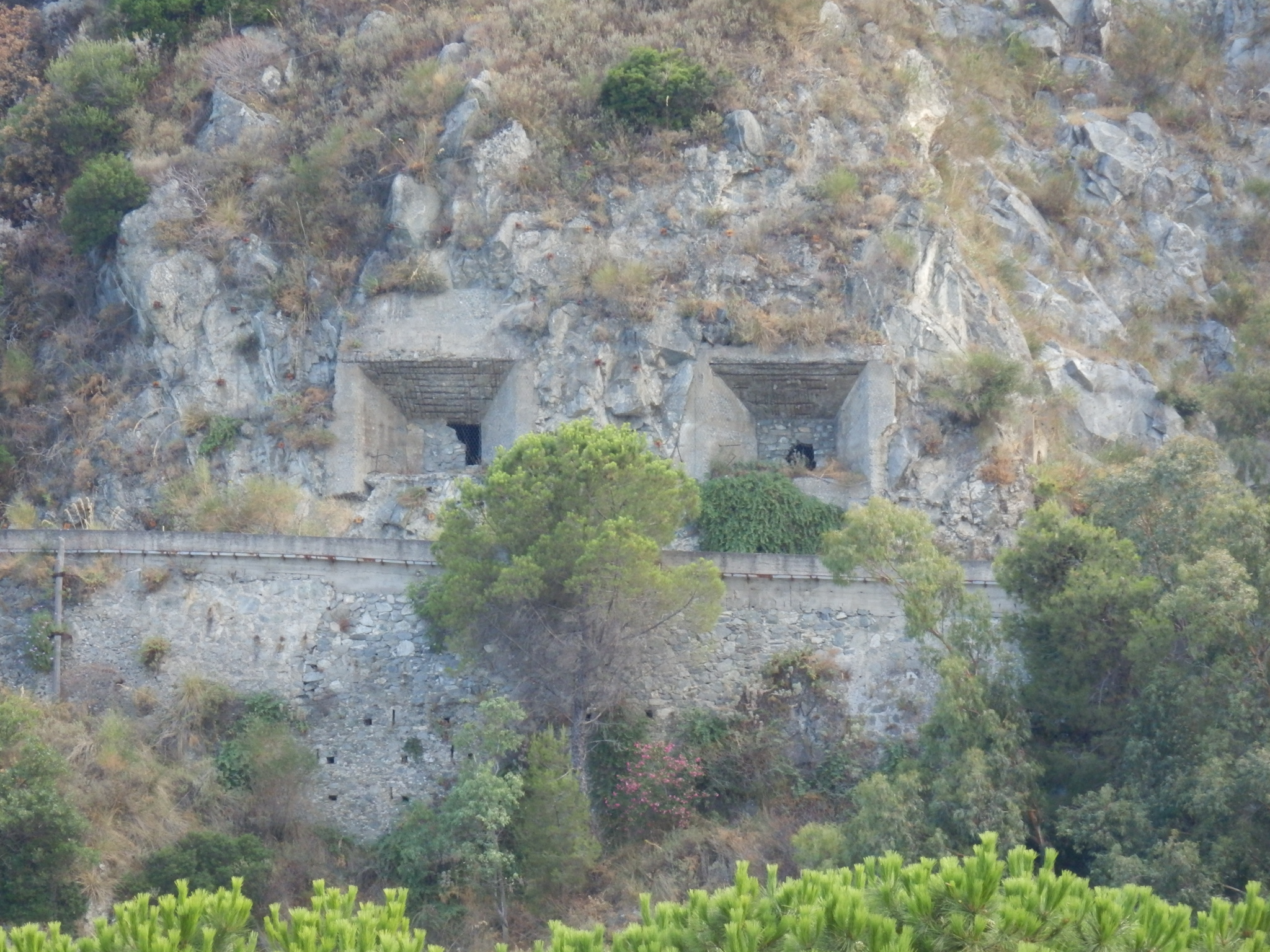
Copanello Bunkers

By the end of the 1930s, the hamlet of Copanello Alto comprised seven houses, including Casa Falcone (formerly Casa Fazzari), while Copanello Lido was still uninhabited. In 1938, the French historian Pierre Courcelle rediscovered the remains of the Chapel of San Martino on the Falcone family estate, and deduced that the site of the Vivarium monastery of Cassiodorus should be on the site of what was then Casa Falcone (formerly Casa Fazzari).

During the World War II, numerous small and medium-sized bunkers were built by Nazi Germany and Fascist Italy.

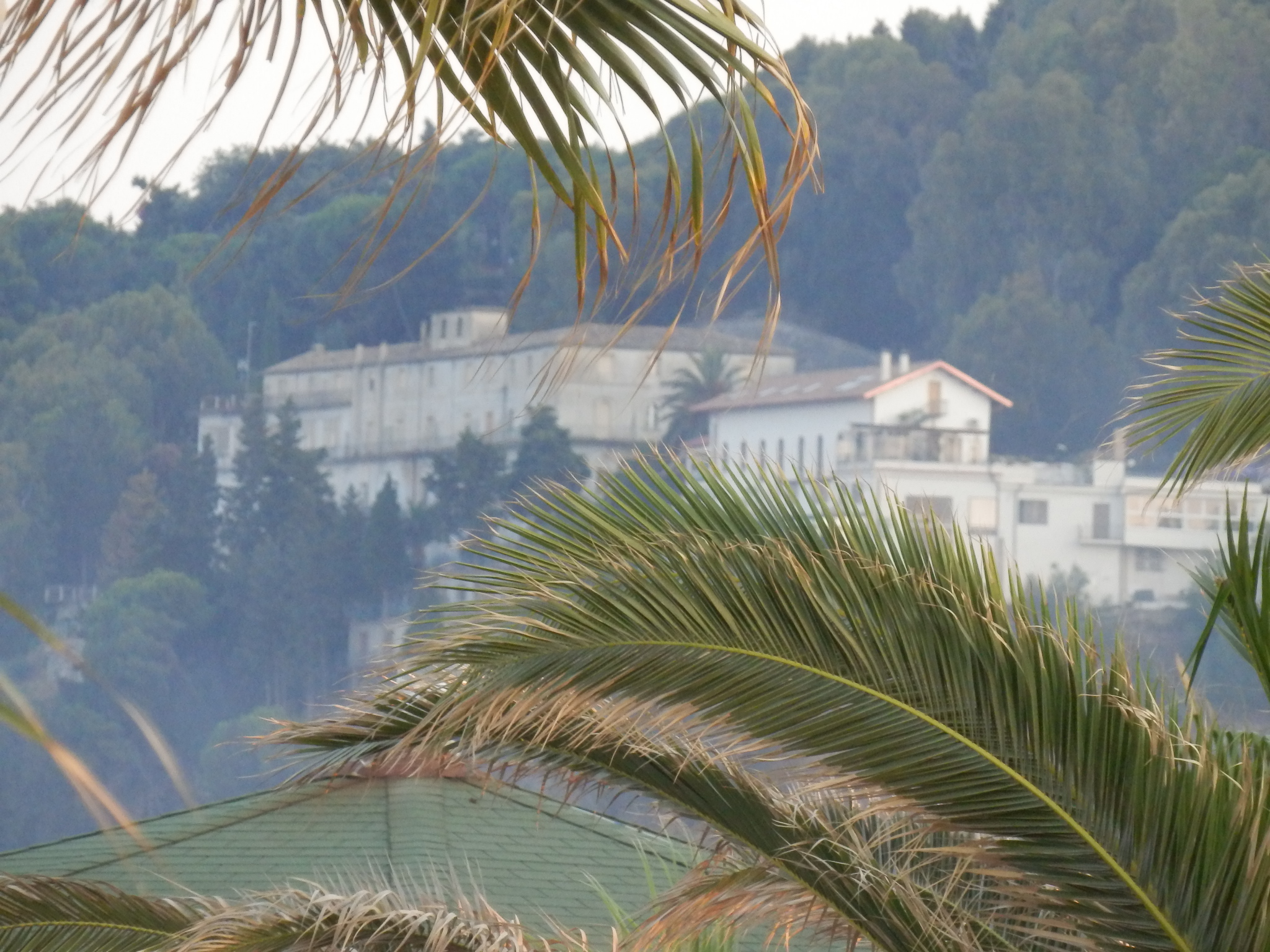
Copanello Motel (ex-Casa Fazzari)

In 1953, Giovanni II Falcone died, and Casa Falcone and the lands of Copanello Alto reverted to his mother, Baroness Elvira Marincola Cattaneo. Four years later, in 1957, Giovanni Gatti, the Baroness's husband, transformed Casa Falcone into a hotel: the Motel Copanello. The Motel was the first hotel to open along the entire Italian Ionian coast, from Reggio Calabria to Taranto. By 1960, the hotel had 10 rooms, and in 1969, a further 30 rooms were opened.

From then on, the influence of the Motel Copanello led others to settle and invest in Copanello Alto and, in 1964, another hotel was opened: the Hotel Conca d'oro (with 30 rooms).

In the 1960s and 1970s, many celebrities stayed at the Motel Copanello. These included: Erminio Macario, actor and singer Renato Rascel, actor Totò, singer and composer Bobby Solo, singer Mal Ryder, singer and actress Rita Pavone and songwriter Peppino di Capri.

Libero Gatti, son of Baroness Elvira Marincola Cattaneo, inherited the Motel Copanello on his mother's death in 1970. In 1982, the hotel was awarded 4-star status, but closed in 1985. At the end of the 1980s, the ex-hotel building housed a small archaeological museum for a few years, and in 1991, Libero Gatti opened the Libero Gatti Naturalist Museum (Museo Naturalistico Libero Gatti in Italian), featuring a collection of numerous shellfish and a small botanical garden. In 2011, Libero Gatti died and the museum closed.

==== Copanello Lido ====
In 1910, Armando Lucifero and his wife Antonietta Enrichetta di Francia took possession of the Casino Pepe and Copanello Lido from the Marquis Lucifero family of Crotone. Whereas the Pepes had allowed archaeologists to excavate on their land (such as François Lenormant, who in the 1880s had researched the Vivarium monastery), the Luciferos were opposed to such research. Armando Lucifero remained owner of Copanello Lido until his death in 1933. He had several sons, including the minister Falcone Lucifero and Antonio Arduino Lucifero, the eldest, who inherited his father's lands and bequeathed them to his son Francesco Lucifero (born 1934).

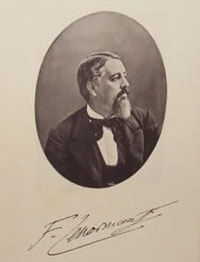
François Lenormant

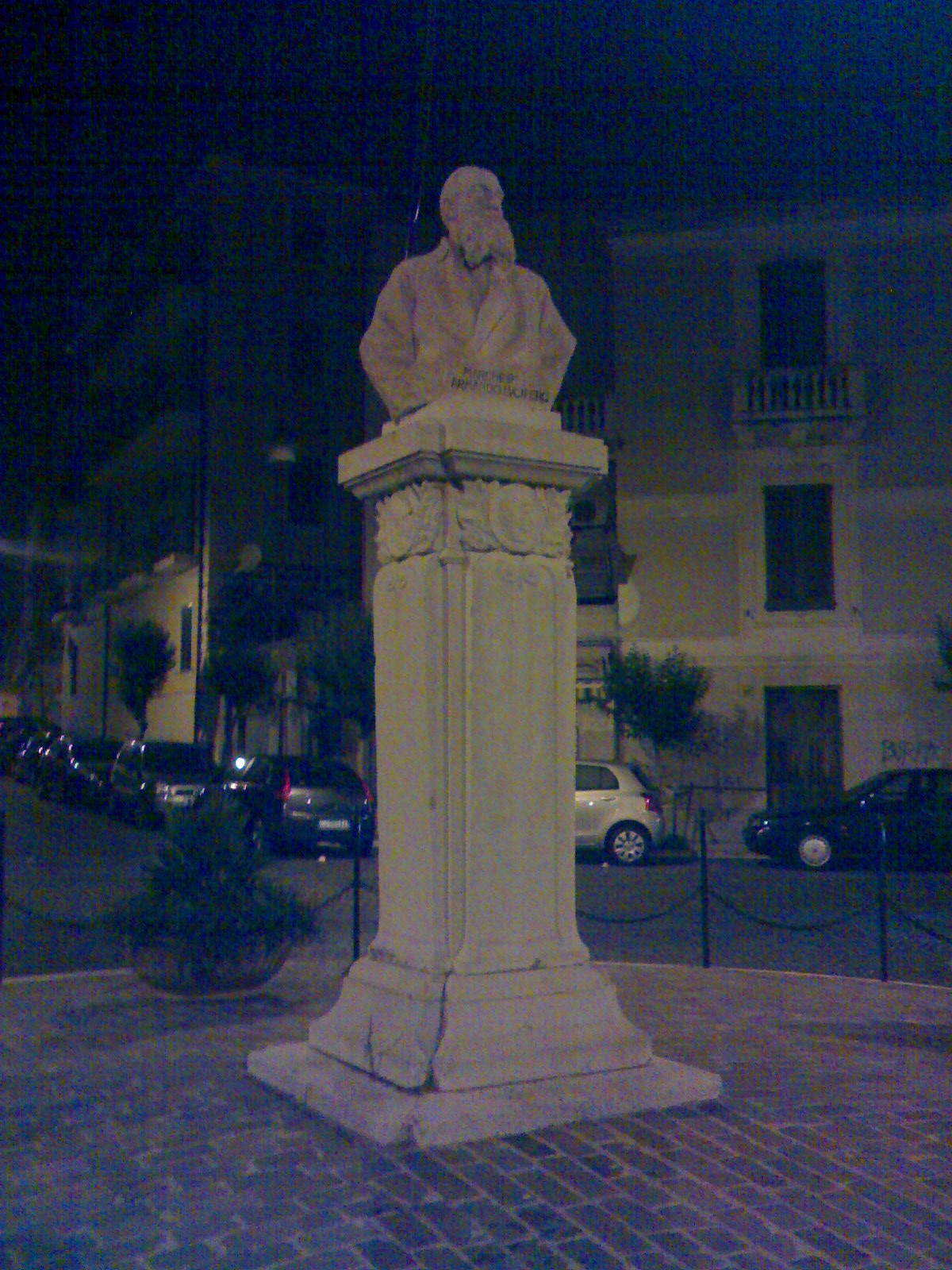
Armando Lucifer envelopes

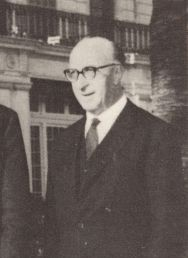
Falcone Lucifero

The Lucifero family continued to own a large part of Coscia di Stalettì, as well as the area currently occupied by Copanello Lido, which was still uninhabited at the time.

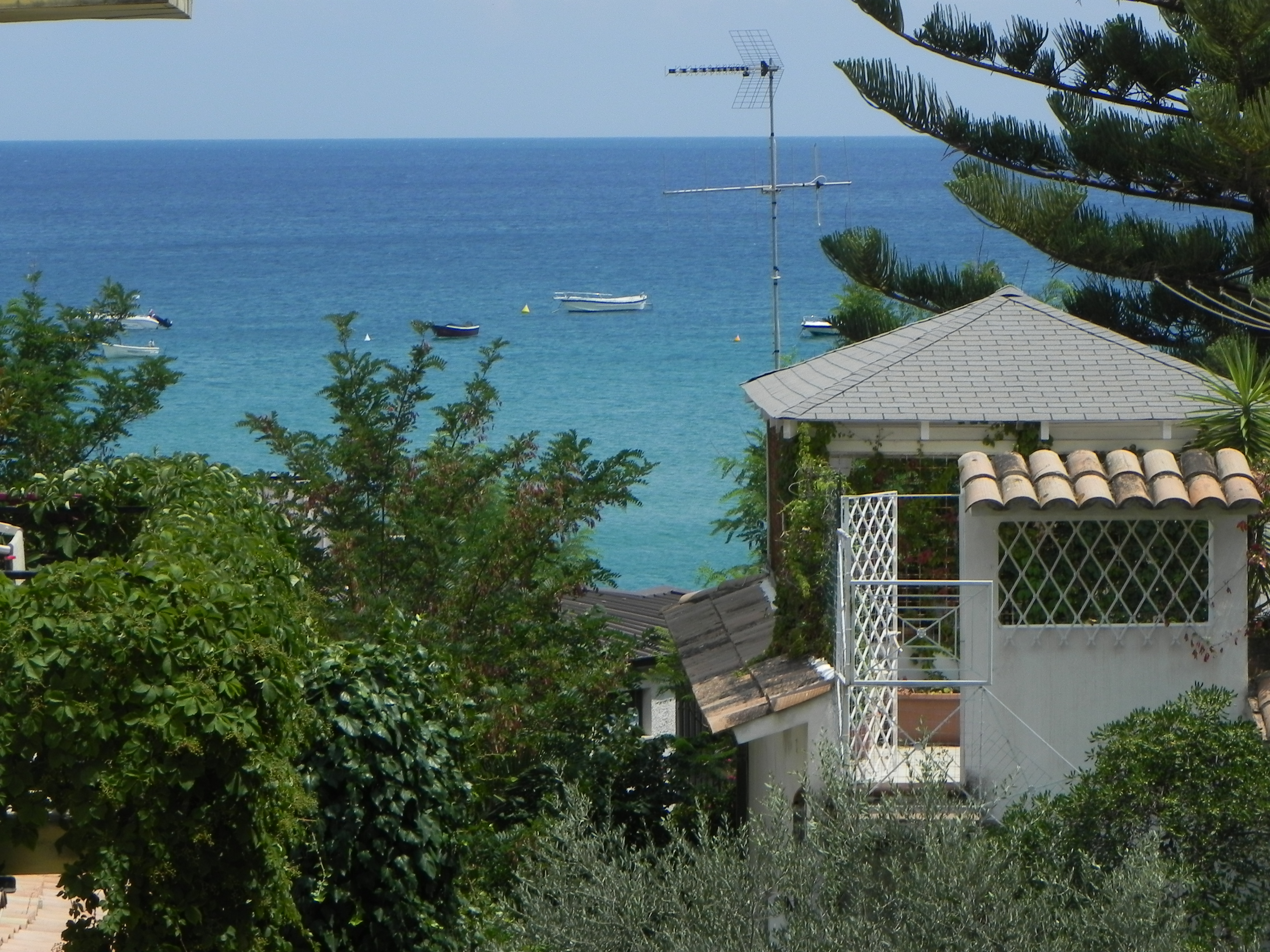
Terrace of the first house in Copanello Lido

Around 1950, Marquis Antonio Susanna agreed with Francesco Lucifero to create a seaside resort. In 1954, Domenico Muscolo, a nephew of the writer Filippo De Nobili (who himself often vacationed at Copanello Lido with his friend Filippo Marincola of the Duke of Petrizzi family), bought a plot of land from Francesco Lucifero and built Copanello Lido's first house, Casa Muscolo, also known as Casa del Pesce, while Susanna bought several plots of land around it. The first houses in the village form a block between today's Via Cassiodoro and Via Lido.

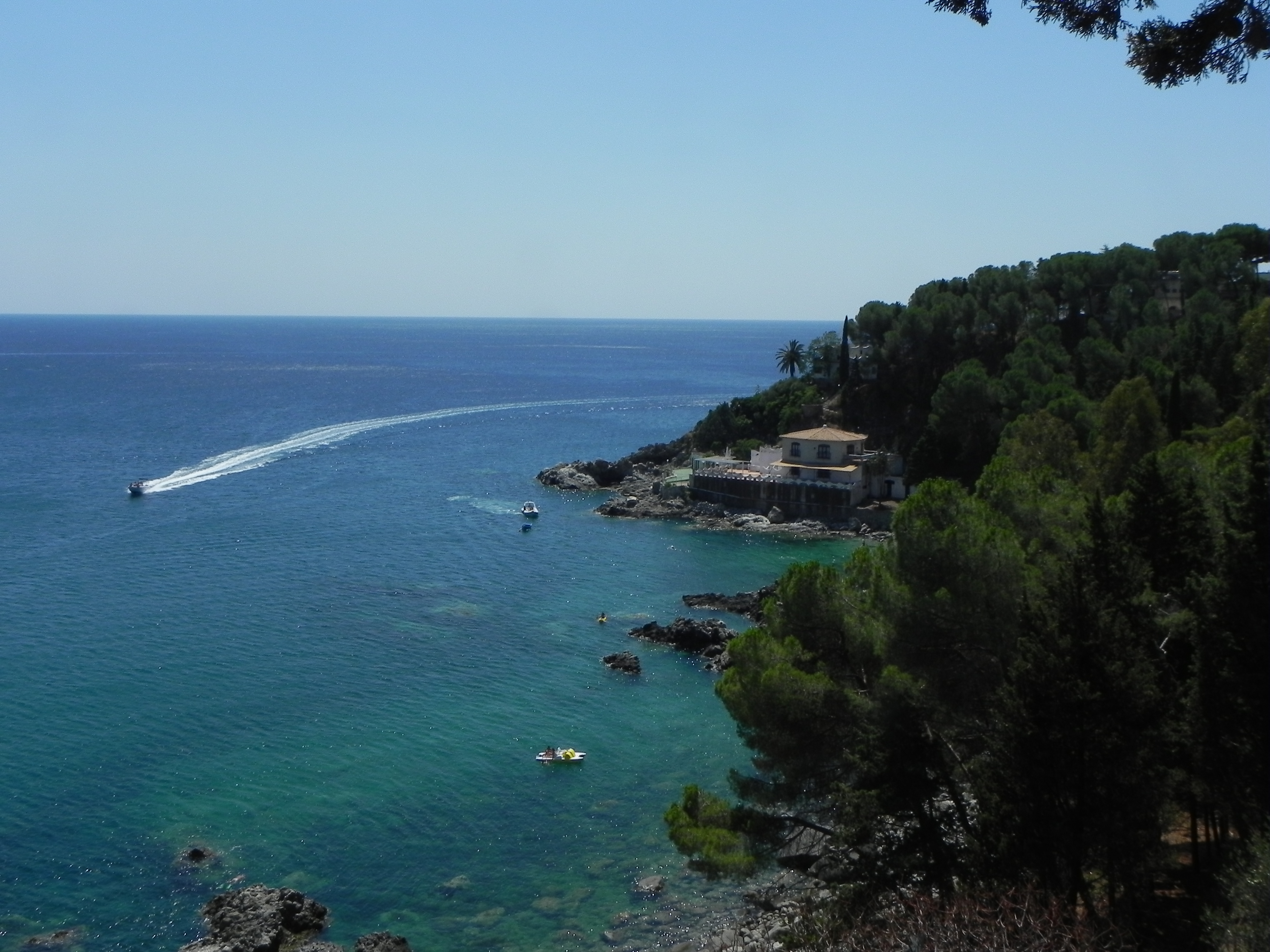
Le Bilbò

At the end of the 1950s, a Catanzaro Lido entrepreneur built beach cabins on the site of today's Lido di Guglielmo, laying the foundations for the future Rotonda. Around 1960, Guglielmo Papaleo (founder of the Guglielmo Caffè company in 1943) took over the construction site and began building the Villagio Guglielmo, which opened in 1969.

In the 1970s, Papaleo, who already owned the Villagio Guglielmo as well as the Rotonda and the beach in front of it, which took the name of Lido di Guglielmo, bought several plots of land and built restaurants and nightclubs including the Rendez-vous, the Hamilton, the Rebus (a nightclub in the nearby frazione of Santa Maria del Mare), the Bilbò and the Blu70.

In 1972, the Guglielmo Caffè roasting plant (previously in Catanzaro) was inaugurated, construction having begun in 1968. The coffee produced at Copanello Lido by this brand is now sold in 9 countries (Italy, the US, Portugal, Belgium, Germany, the Czech Republic, South Korea, Switzerland and Latvia), and is now managed by the son-in-law and nephews of company founder Guglielmo Papaleo: Roberto Volpi, Daniele Rossi and Matteo Tubertini.

From 1972, when Copanello Lido consisted only of the original 3 houses and the Villagio Guglielmo, Guglielmo Papaleo built and resold several house complexes, which later formed the oldest part of Copanello Lido. He was followed by other owners from Catanzaro, who also bought land from Francesco Lucifero and built houses on it.

At the end of the 1970s, Copanello Lido was home to such celebrities as Gloria Gaynor, Franco Califano, Gino Paoli, Rocky Roberts, Rita Pavone and Frank Sinatra, as well as actor Raf Vallone (1916–2002).

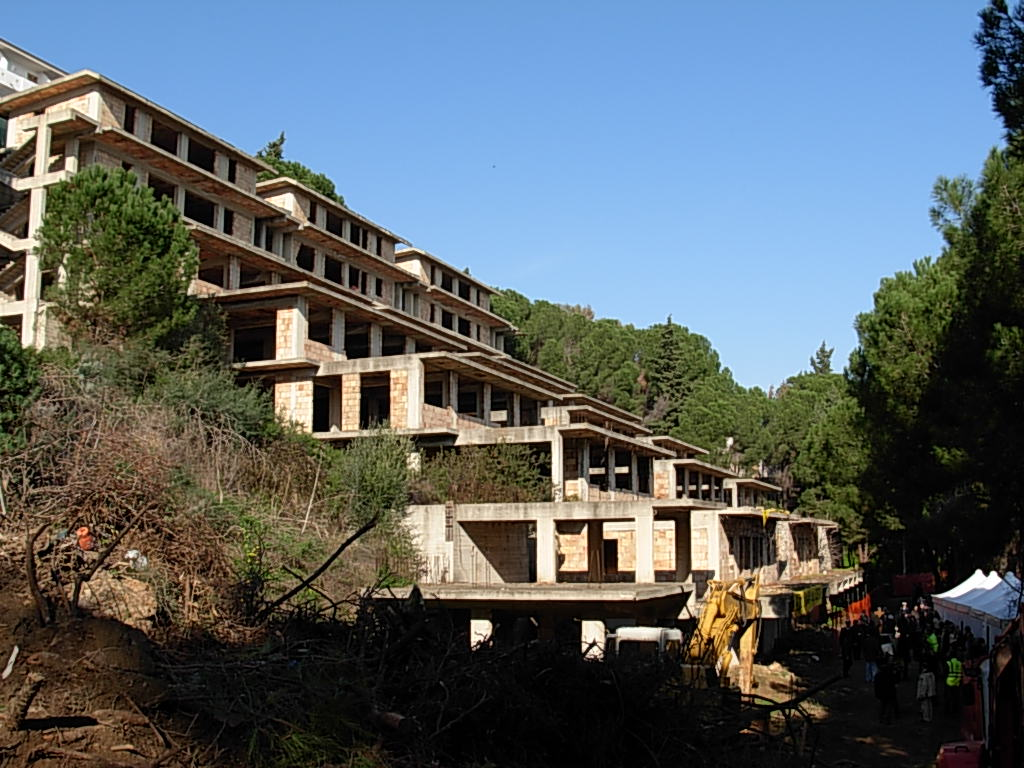
L'Ecomostro of Copanello Lido

In the early 1980s, a large 15,000 m2 reinforced concrete, nicknamed the Ecomostro, was built on the side of the Coscia de Stalettì in Copanello Lido. It consisted of four buildings: two 6-storey, one 5-storey and one 9-storey. In 1987, the first request for demolition was made, but it was not until twenty years later that it was accepted. The Ecomostro was demolished on 16 January 2007, in the presence of Environment Minister Alfonso Pecoraro Scanio, after the demolition order had been issued in 2006. This action was welcomed by the WWF and Calabrian environmentalists, who also called for the destruction of several other ecomostri (ecological monsters) located in the provinces of Crotone, Cosenza and Vibo Valentia.

In addition to Villagio Guglielmo, several other hotels now exist in Copanello Lido: Hotel Club Poseidon, Villagio Club Cala Verde and Hotel Il Gabbiano.

== Economy ==
=== Copanello Alto ===
Copanello Alto was home to the Libero Gatti Naturalist Museum (formerly the Motel Copanello), which included a collection of over 1,000 shells ranging from those measuring over a metre (for the largest) to those barely a millimetre long. Outside the museum was a small botanical garden featuring many varieties of Mediterranean flora, as well as a pine forest. The museum closed in 2011 following the death of its owner, Libero Gatti.

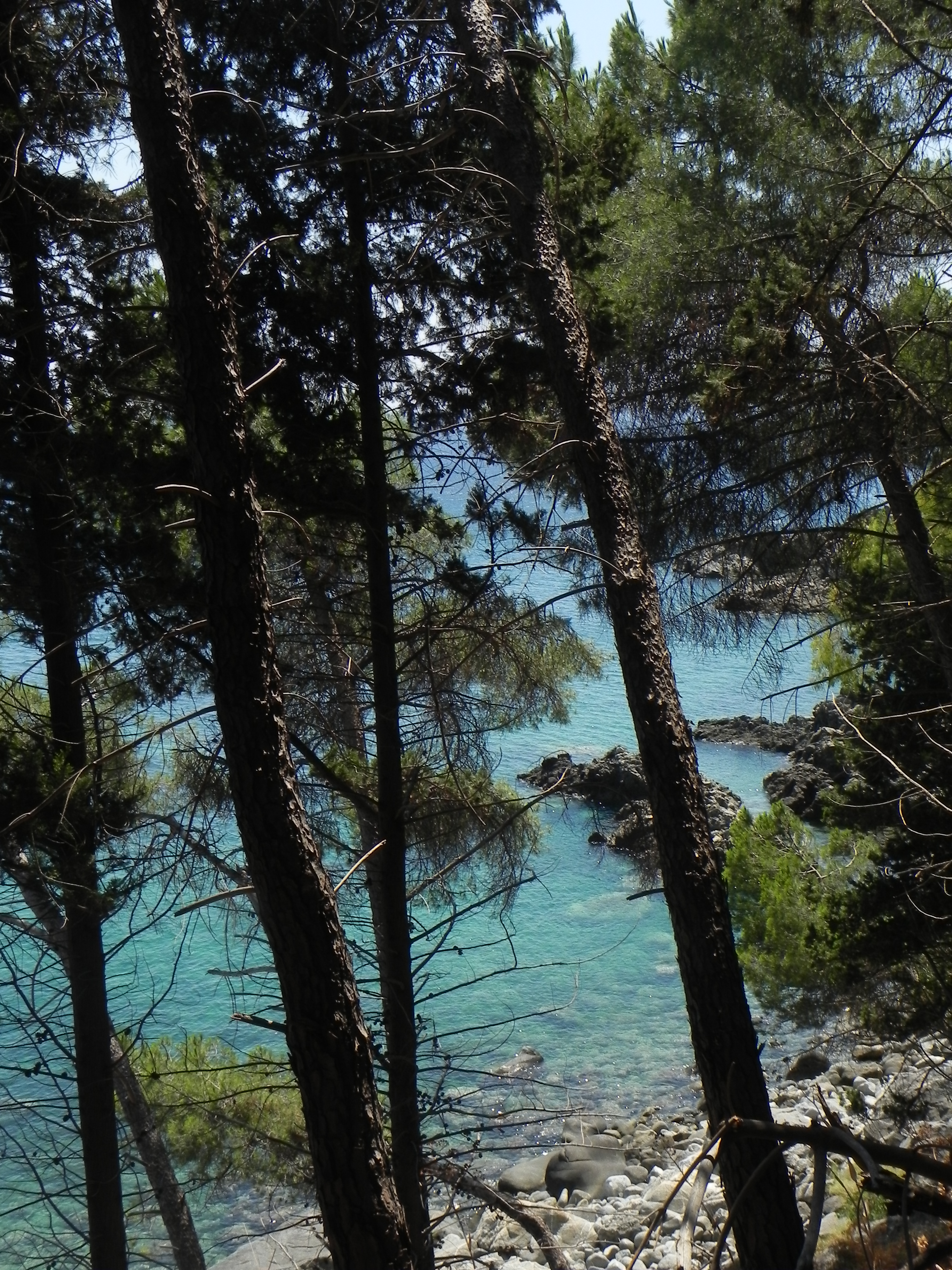
The pine forest of Libero Gatti's former botanical garden

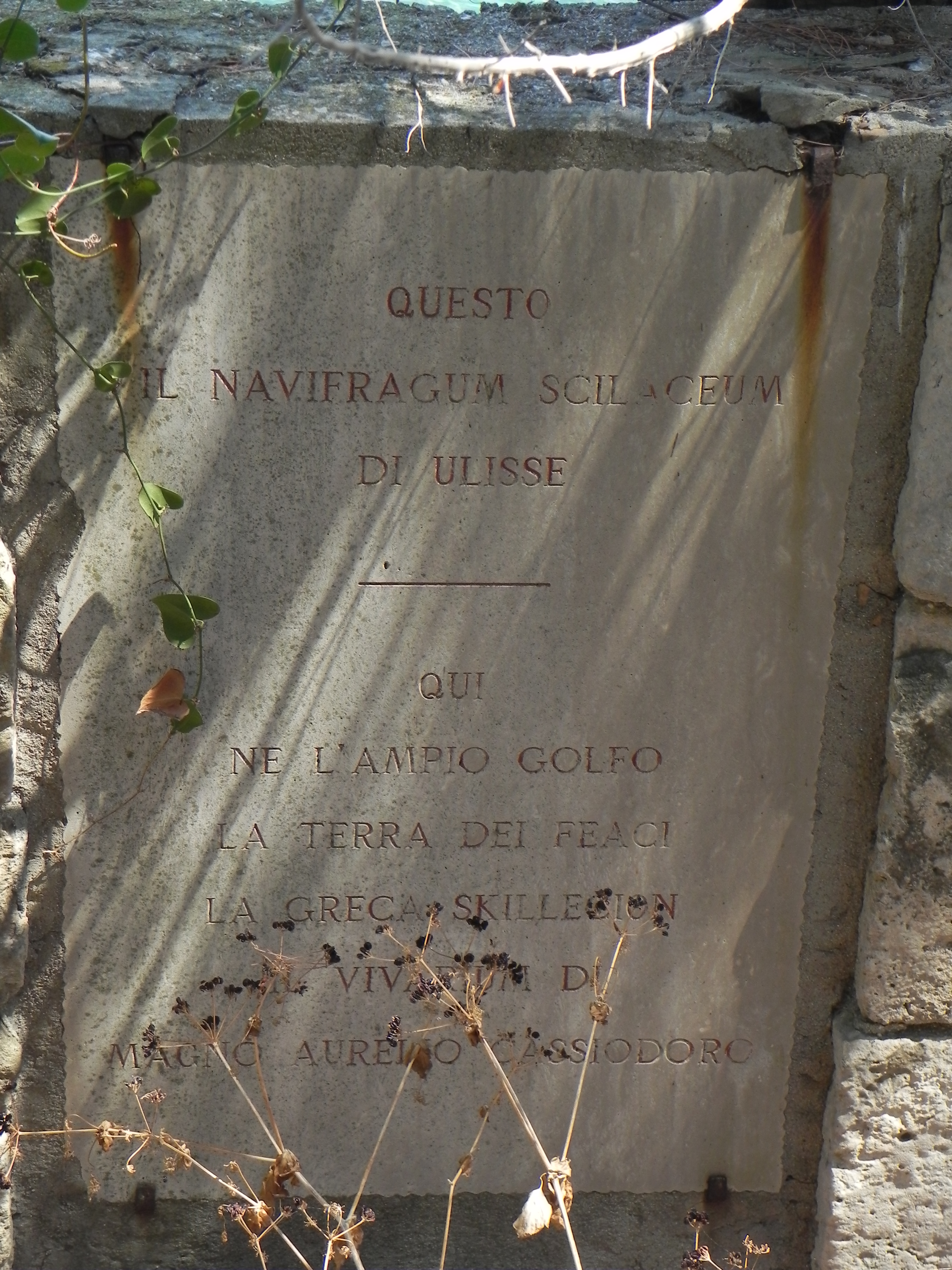
Stele in honour of Ulysses in the former botanical garden

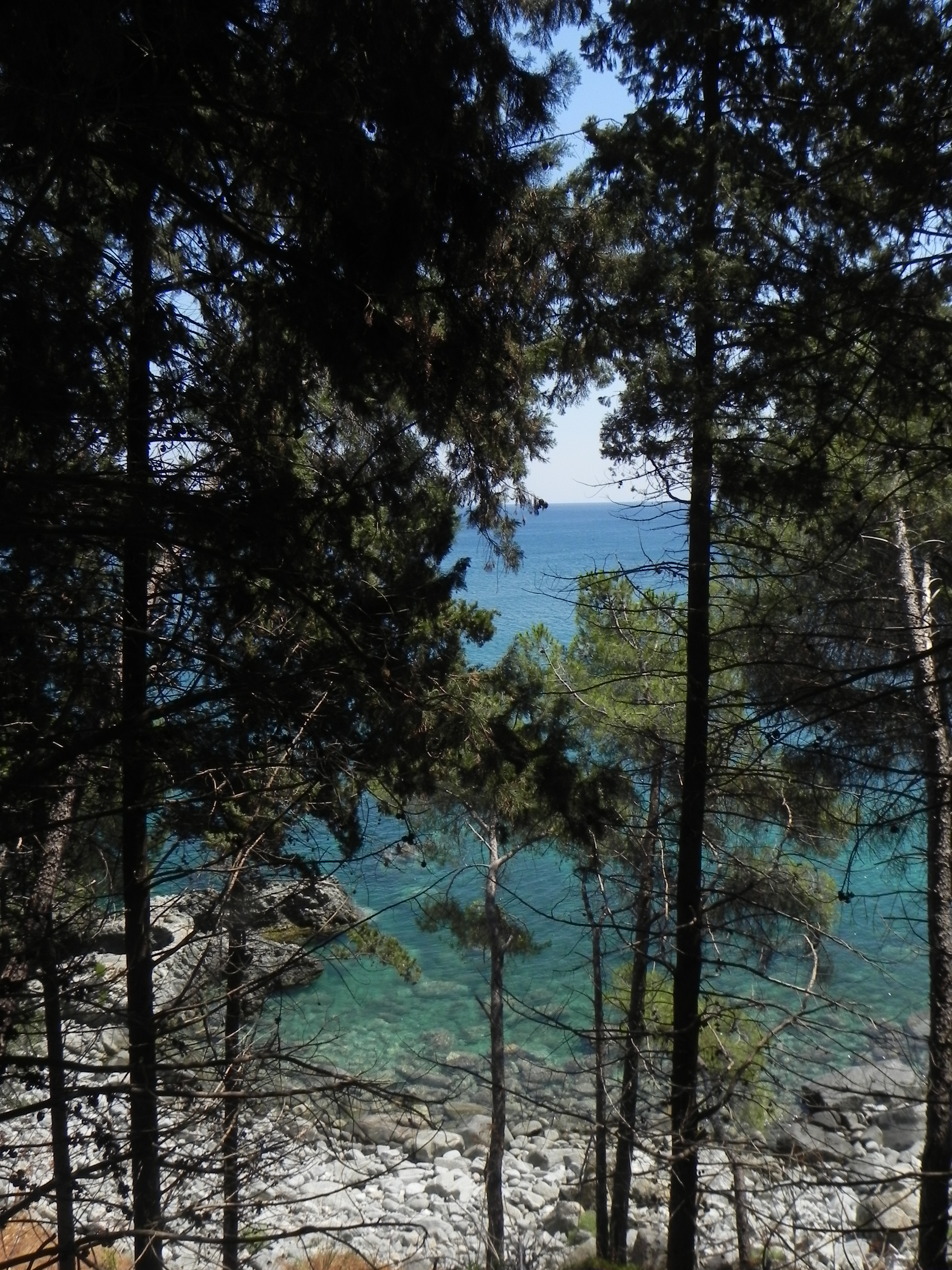
The pine forest and Les Vasche de Cassiodorus in the background

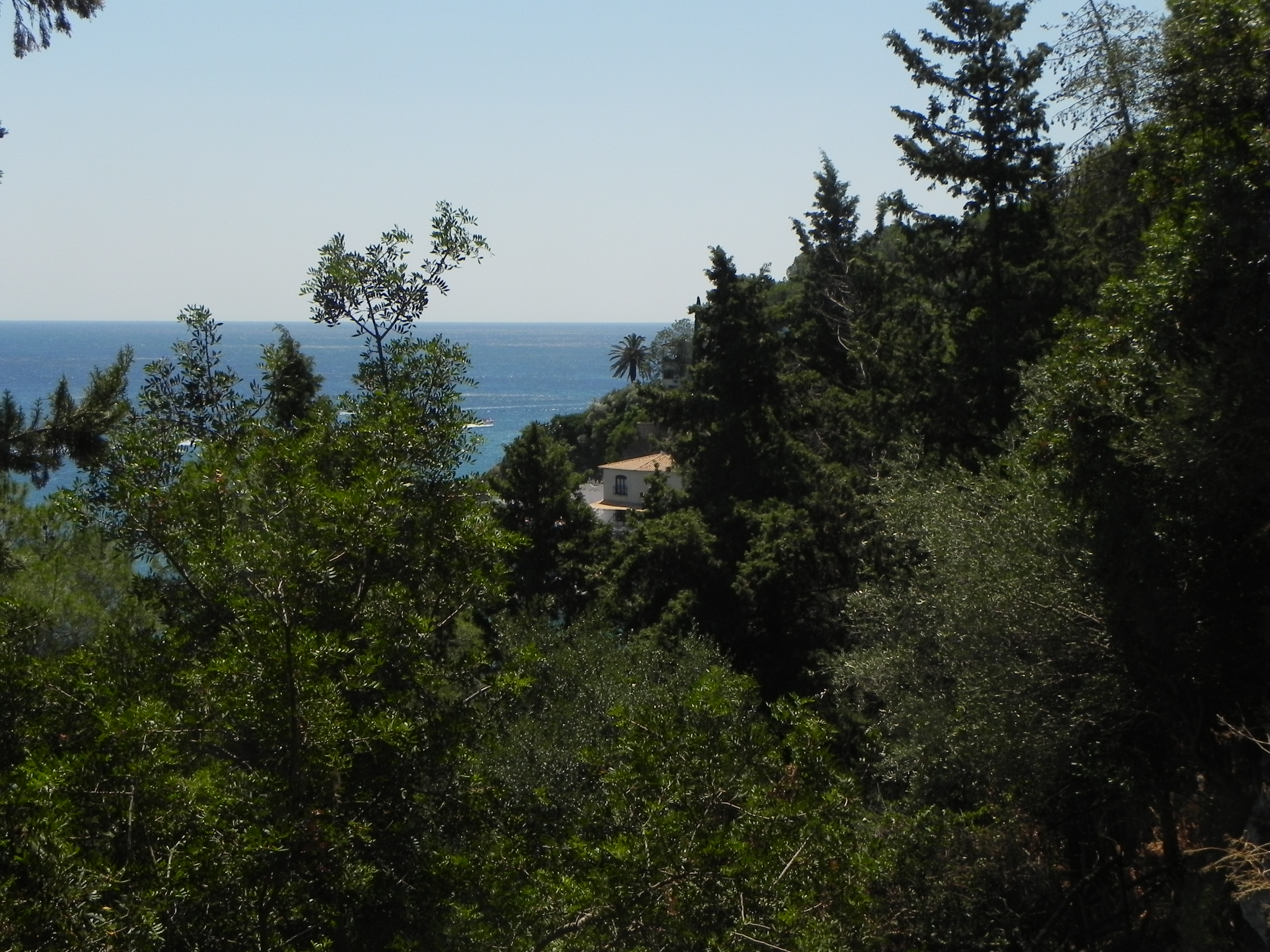
View of Bilbò from the pine forest

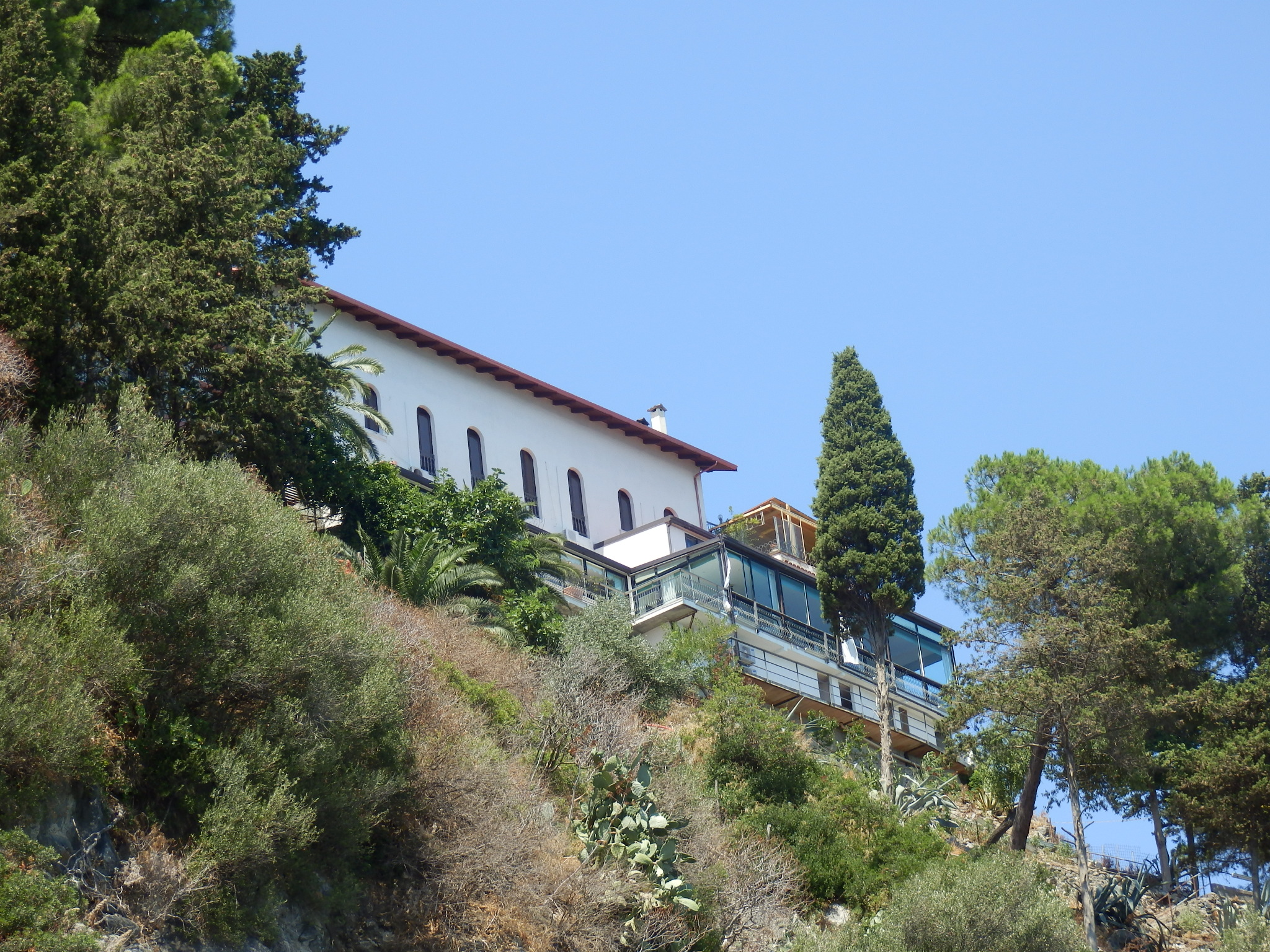
Le Terrazze

There is one hotel in Copanello Alto, the Hotel Conca d'oro, which has been open since 1964. It is located at Via Conca d'Oro 1, just off the state highway 106 Jonica, and has 30 rooms.

Adjacent to the former Libero Gatti Naturalist Museum, Le Terrazze restaurant overlooks Piazza Giovanni Falcone, and today belongs to the Marincola family.

Along Route Provinciale 52 towards the village of Stalettì is the Hotel Residence Copanello.

At Piazzale Marincola no. 9 is the Hotel Hamilton House, overlooking the Vasche di Cassiodoro on the east side. Inside the hotel is the Luna Restaurant.

Copanello Lido has a small train station. It is on lines 397-A (Catanzaro to Catanzaro via Squillace and Girifalco), 400-A (Gasperina to Catanzaro) and 400-B (Gasperina to Catanzaro).

=== Copanello Lido ===
Copanello Lido boasts a number of resorts:

- Villagio Guglielmo, on piazza Susanna and via Lucifero.
- Hotel Club Poseidon, on via Lido.
- Villagio Club Cala Verde, in the northern part of Copanello, near the bridge and the mouth of the Alessi river, with an entrance on via Lido.
- Hotel Il Gabbiano, on via Lido.

Copanello Lido has its own pharmacy, Dispensario Marino Giuseppe, in piazza Antonio Susanna, opposite Villagio Guglielmo.

Via Lido is also home to a Carabinieri logistical and operational base, as well as an Italian National Police bathing center, each with its own private beach.

In 1972, the Guglielmo Caffè roasting plant (previously in Catanzaro) was inaugurated, construction of which had begun in 1968. The coffee produced in Copanello Lido by this brand is now sold in 9 countries (Italy, the United States, Portugal, Belgium, Germany, the Czech Republic, South Korea, Switzerland and Latvia), and is now managed by the son-in-law and nephews of company founder Guglielmo Papaleo: Roberto Volpi, Daniele Rossi and Matteo Tubertini.

Close to the Guglielmo Caffè roasting plant and the Casino Pepe is an old, abandoned cement works, consisting of two towers, which once belonged to the Calcementi Calabri company. The plant's last owner was Stefano Siracusa, head of Italtractor in southern Italy, who had bought it from Zoppas of Pordenone. His plan was to demolish the Copanello cement works and build a Vacation Village, but his idea was rejected by the municipality of Stalettì.

In 1986, the Sansone family (a noble Sicilian family who once held the title of Duke) opened a jewelry store in Copanello Lido, specializing in the sale of coral jewelry: the Anna dei Coralli jewelry store.

Copanello Lido has a small train station. It is on lines 389 (Catanzaro to Soverato Marina), 401-B (Soverato to Palermiti) and 403-A (Chiaravalle Centrale to Catanzaro).

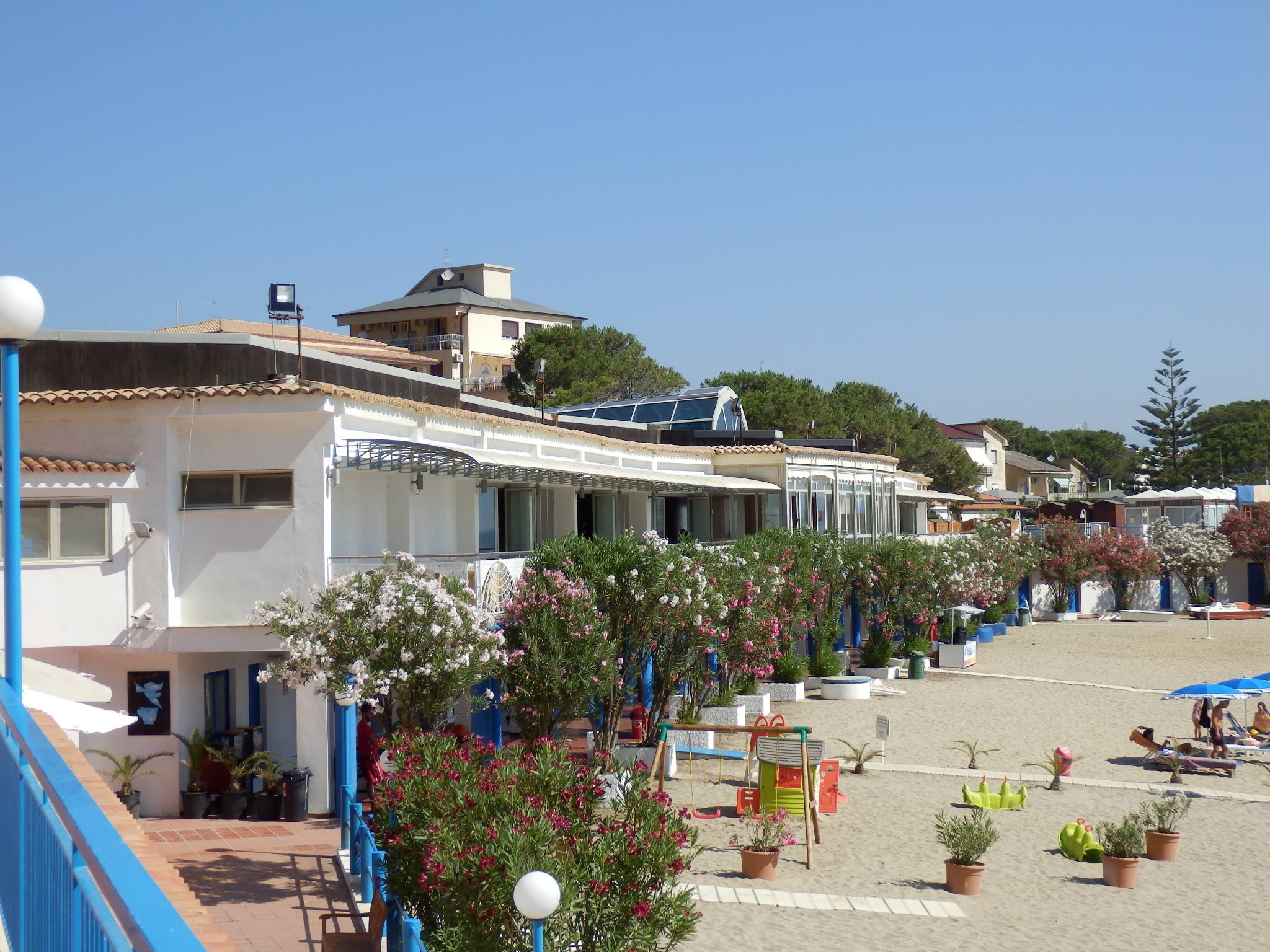
Le Lido of Guglielmo

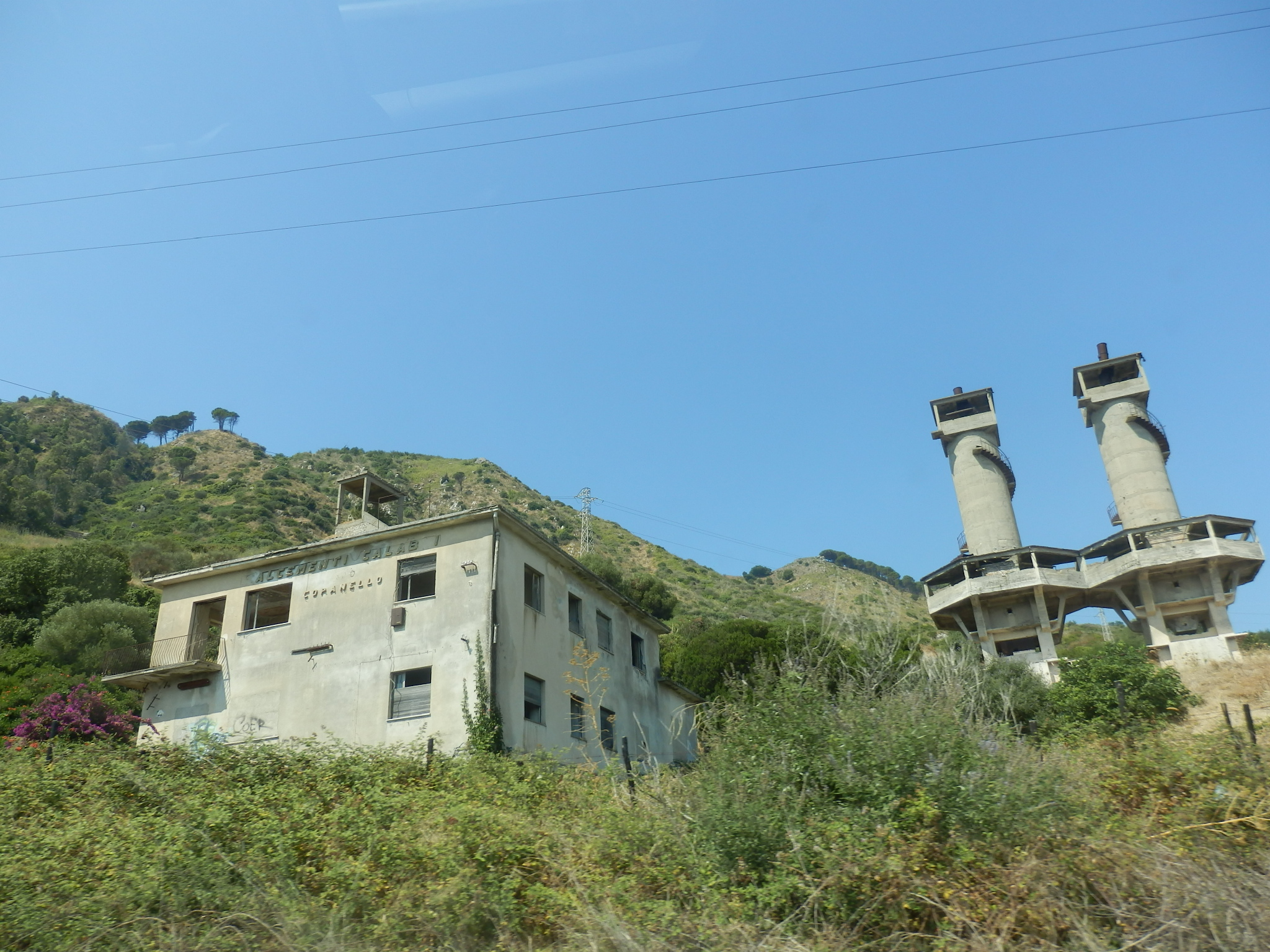
Abandoned Copanello cement plant

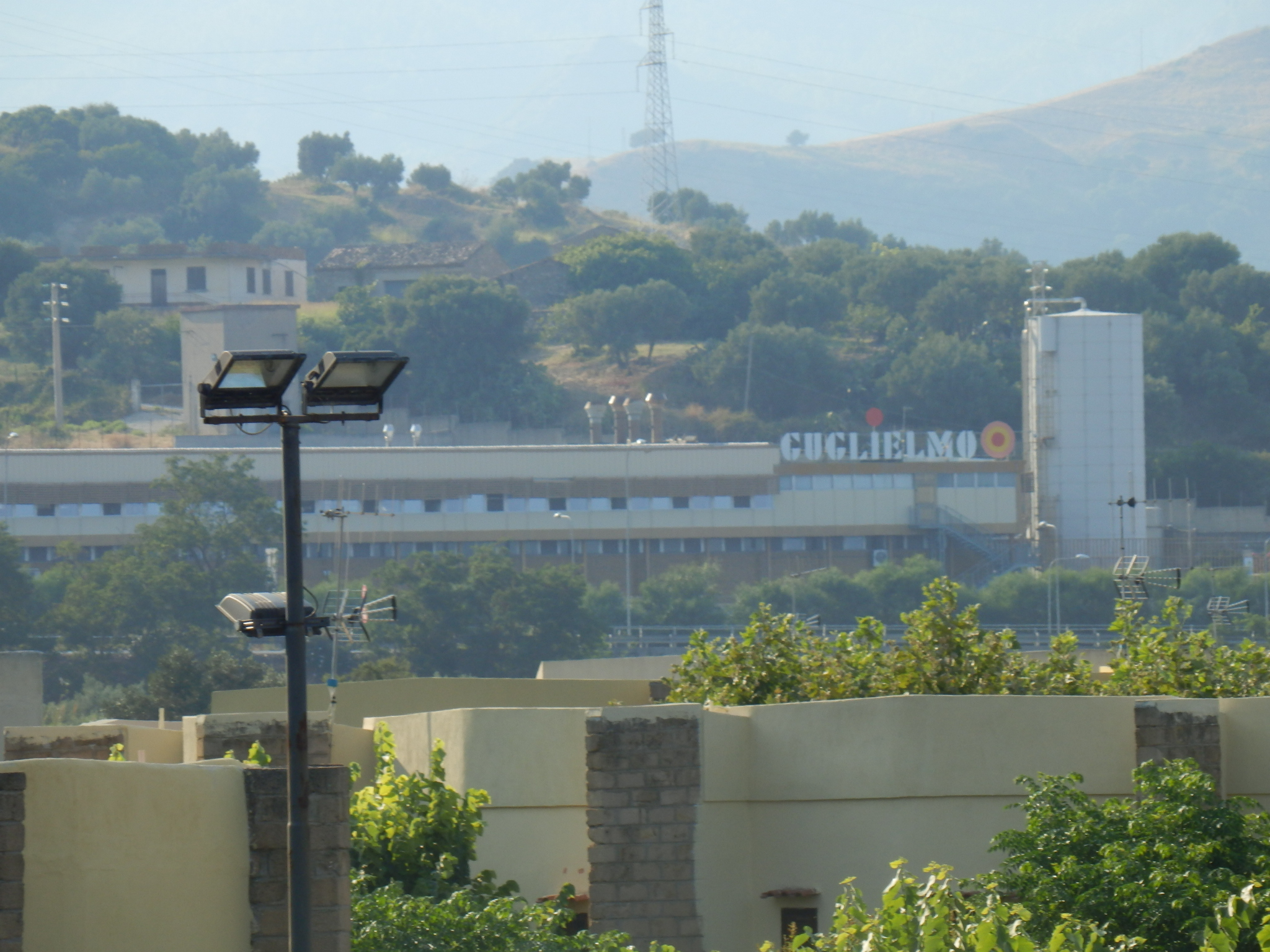
Guglielmo Caffè roasting plant

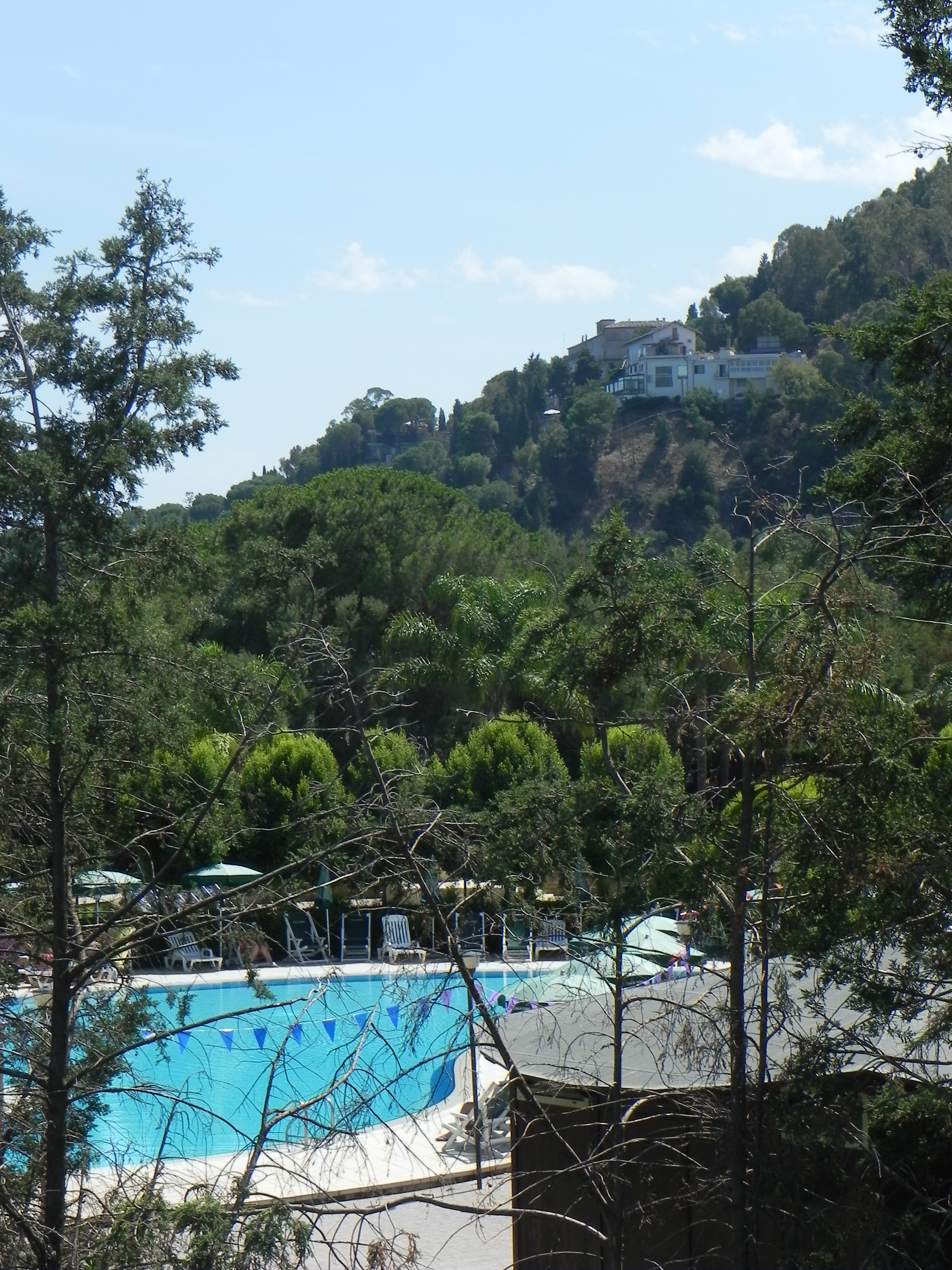
Villagio Club Cala Verde

== Culture ==
=== Gastronomy ===
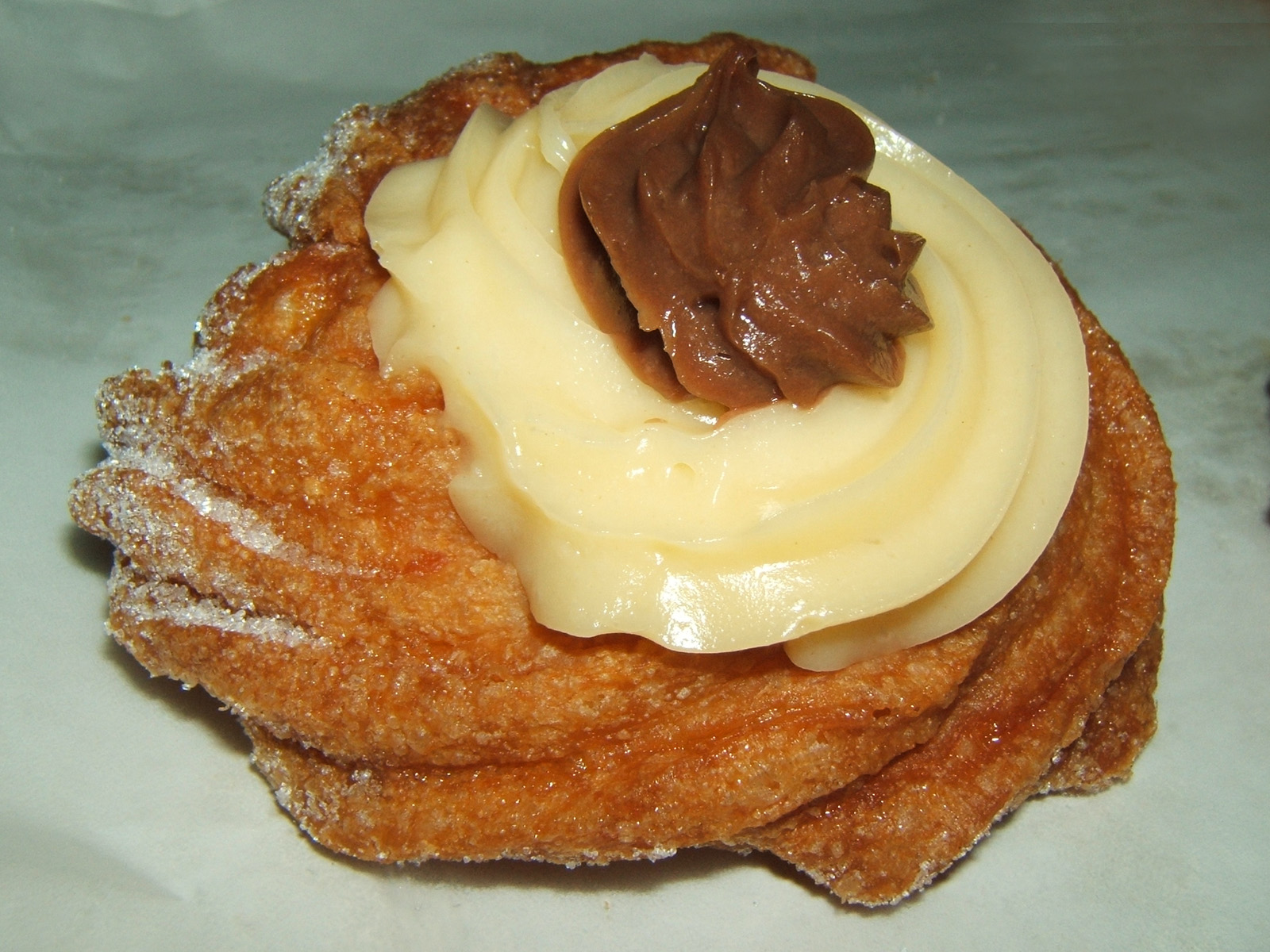
A zeppola

Copanello's gastronomic heritage is shared with that of the commune of Stalettì.

These include scilatelle (a pasta similar to Ligurian trofie), wild fennel pasta and broccoli pasta.

Meat dishes also feature prominently, with eggs with frisulimiti (frisulimitisare Calabrian pig pies) and ′nduja vajanata (a type of piquant sausage made only in the Stalettì area).

Pastries are also part of the commune's typical diet, with zeppole (fried egg pastry with amarena, chocolate or custard) and cuzzupe (flaky pastry with hard-boiled eggs embedded in it).

=== Events ===
==== Religious festivals ====
A number of popular and religious festivals are held in Copanello and the commune of Stalettì. The main one is the Feast of San Gregorio, in honor of Stalettì's patron saint, Gregory Thaumaturgus, who is celebrated every year on 13 May and 17 November. The feast consists of a procession in which the statue of San Gregorio is carried from the Convent of Stalettì to Copanello Lido, before being taken by sea to the nearby frazione of Caminia. St. Roch de Montpellier, known as San Rocco in Italian, is the co-patron saint of the commune and is celebrated on 16 August during the feast of San Rocco, which consists of a religious procession through the streets of Stalettì.

The Ballo del Ciuccio is held in Stalettì every year on 15 August the day before San Rocco's feast, while the Fiera di San Gregorio, a fair in honor of the patron saint, is held from 15 to 17 November.

==== Boxing trophies ====
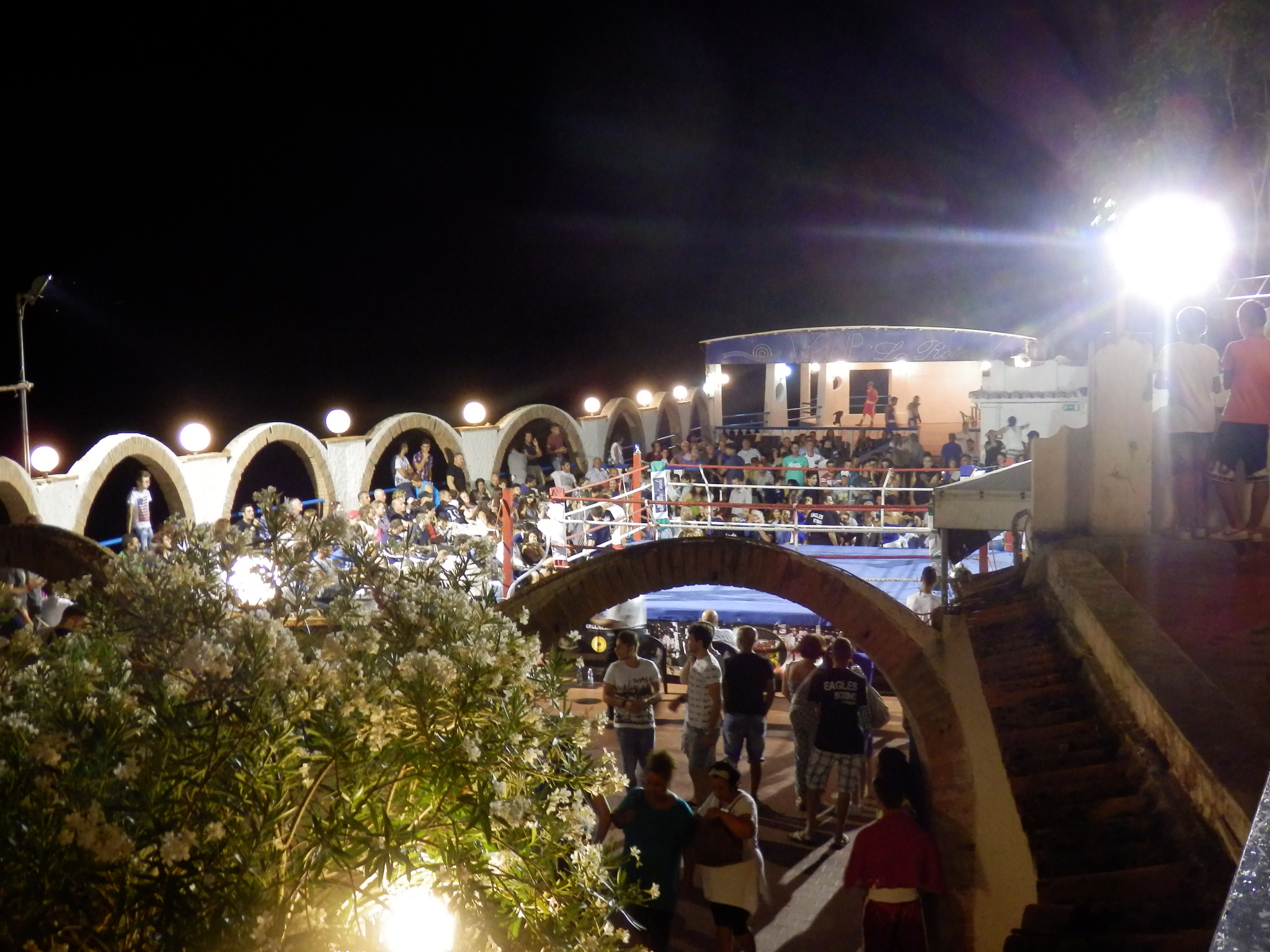
The 5th "Guglielmo Papaleo" Boxing Trophy

Since 2011, the "Guglielmo Papaleo" Boxing Trophy (Italian: Trofeo di Pugilato "Guglielmo Papaleo") has been held annually in Copanello Lido. This is an inter-regional men's and women's American boxing event on the Rotonda (owned by the Guglielmo Caffè company), created by Guglielmo Caffè entrepreneur Daniele Rossi in honour of his grandfather, the company's founder.

The 1st "Guglielmo Papaleo" Boxing Trophy takes place on 29 August 2011 at around 9 pm. Boxers from Calabria, Apulia and Sicily compete.

The 2nd "Guglielmo Papaleo" Boxing Trophy takes place on 29 July 2012. It featured boxers from Calabria (Catanzaro, Lamezia Terme, Cropani, Chiaravalle Centrale, Montepaone and San Vito sullo Ionio), Apulia and Sardinia.

The 3rd "Guglielmo Papaleo" Boxing Trophy takes place on 5 August 2013. Boxers from Calabria, Campania and Sicily competed.

The 4th "Guglielmo Papaleo" Boxing Trophy takes place on 27 July 2014. Boxers from Calabria (Catanzaro, Lamezia Terme and Cropani), Naples, Taranto and Bari compete. For the first time in the Trophy's history, a boxer of international renown is invited: boxer Patrizio Oliva, Olympic boxing champion in Moscow in 1980.

The 5th "Guglielmo Papaleo" Boxing Trophy takes place on 26 July 2015. It features boxers from Calabria (Catanzaro, Reggio Calabria and Crotone), Lazio, Campania (Naples), Apulia (Taranto) and Sicily (Catania). This year's special guest is Clemente Russo, twice world boxing champion (in 2007 and 2013), who takes to the ring alongside Daniele Rossi as well as the mayor of Stalettì, Concetta Stanizzi, and the mayor of Soverato, Ernesto Alecci.

== Heritage ==
=== Fauna and flora ===
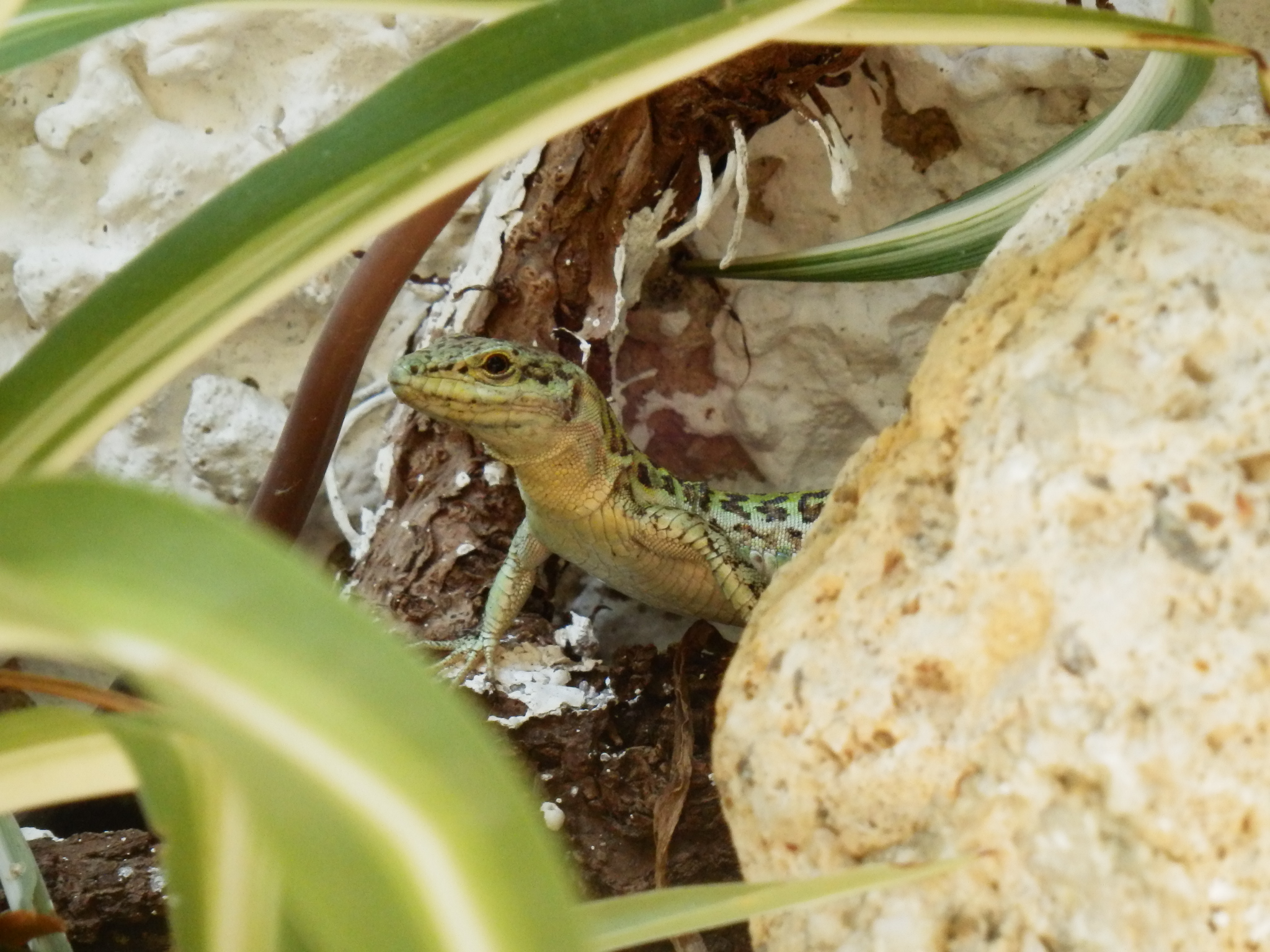
A podarcis sicula lizard in Copanello Lido

The Alessi river mouth ecosystem includes numerous species of amphibians (frogs and toads), rodents (mainly myomorphs: mice and rats) and insects (dragonflies, flies, mosquitoes, bees and wasps). The Alessi's water surface is also home to water striders and duckweed.

Cane plantations and raspberries occupy a large part of Copanello's territory. These provide protection for water birds such as kingfishers and ducks. The local fauna also includes frogs, toads, lizards (especially podarcis sicula), flathead grey mullets and dragonflies, as well as various bird species such as crows, Turtle Doves, grey wagtails and gulls, and bats.

The beach is home to various halophilic organisms (organisms that thrive in high salt concentrations), such as sea holly, sea daffodil, tamarisk, sea fennel and salsola.

The western part of Copanello Lido is occupied by numerous olive groves, while the area around Copanello Alto and south-west of Copanello Lido comprises rocky terrain on which various types of conifers grow.

Throughout most of Copanello, several species of cactus and prickly pear are also present, as are numerous oleanders.

=== Copanello reef ===
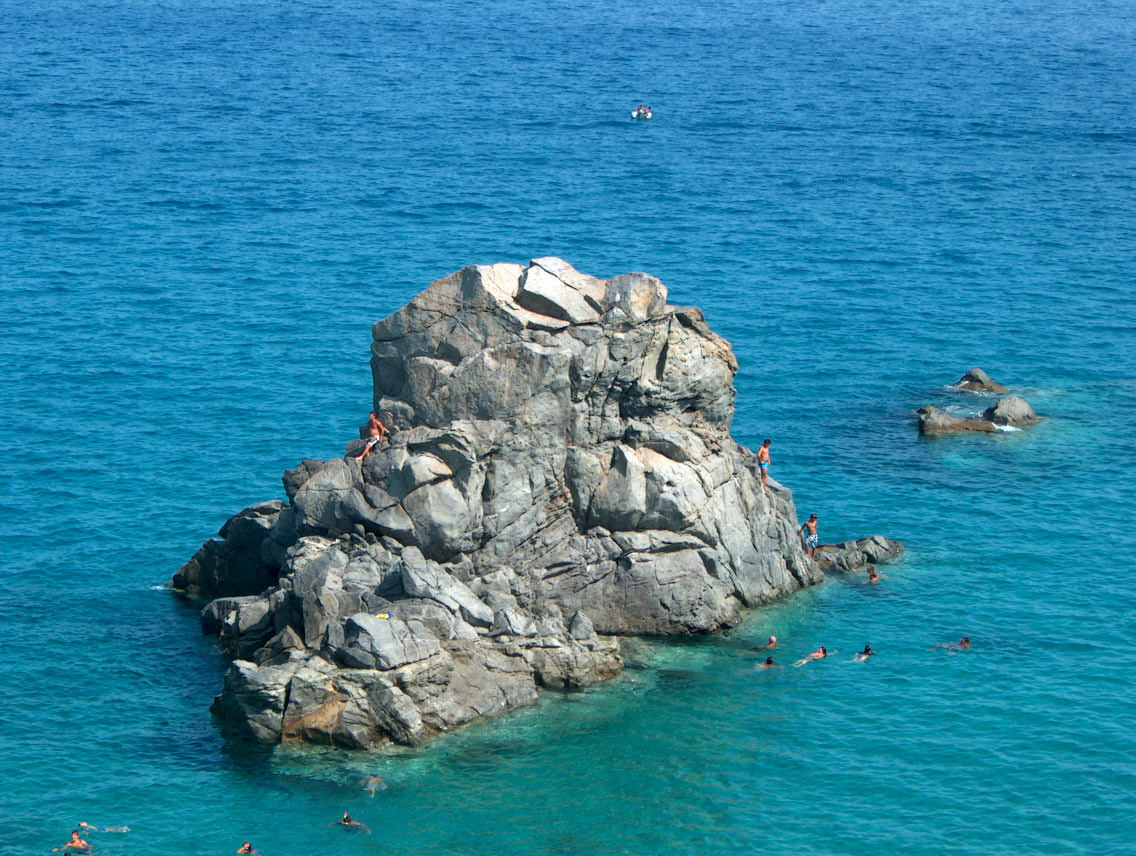
La Pietra Grande

The Copanello reef (Italian: Scogliera di Copanello) starts south of Copanello Lido beach, at the end of Lido Guglielmo (this part of the reef is called Punta Cardillo). It runs along most of the coastline of the municipality of Stalettì, ending after the Grotta di San Gregorio in the Caminia frazione. It passes at the foot of the Coscia di Stalettì, below Copanello Alto, where the Vasche di Cassiodoro are located. The reef is composed mainly of igneous and metamorphic rock.

At the end of the World War II, surveyor Giovanni Gatti took part, on behalf of the Guglielmo Caffè company and the Provincial Tourism Organization, in the construction on the reef of the Rotonda at Copanello Lido and a ski jump, now destroyed. At the time, a concrete path linked Vasche di Cassiodoro to Copanello Lido.

Just over a kilometer from the Vasche di Cassiodoro, opposite the frazione di Caminia and the Copanello reef, lies the 13-metre-high rock La Pietra Grande (Scoglio la Pietra Grande in Italian). For two years running, this rock has been the venue for the World High Diving Championships.

=== Remains of the Vivarium monastery ===
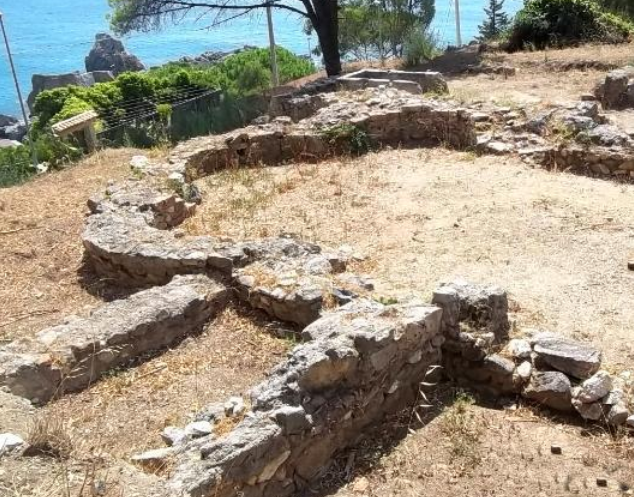
Chapel of San Martino

The Vivarium monastery was a Calabrian monastery founded between 535 and 555 by Cassiodorus. It owes its name to the fishponds (today known as Vasche di Cassiodoro) that the founder had built at the foot of the monastery. In addition to the main building, which included a library, the monastery was adjoined by a church called Chapel of San Martino (Capella di San Martino in Italian).

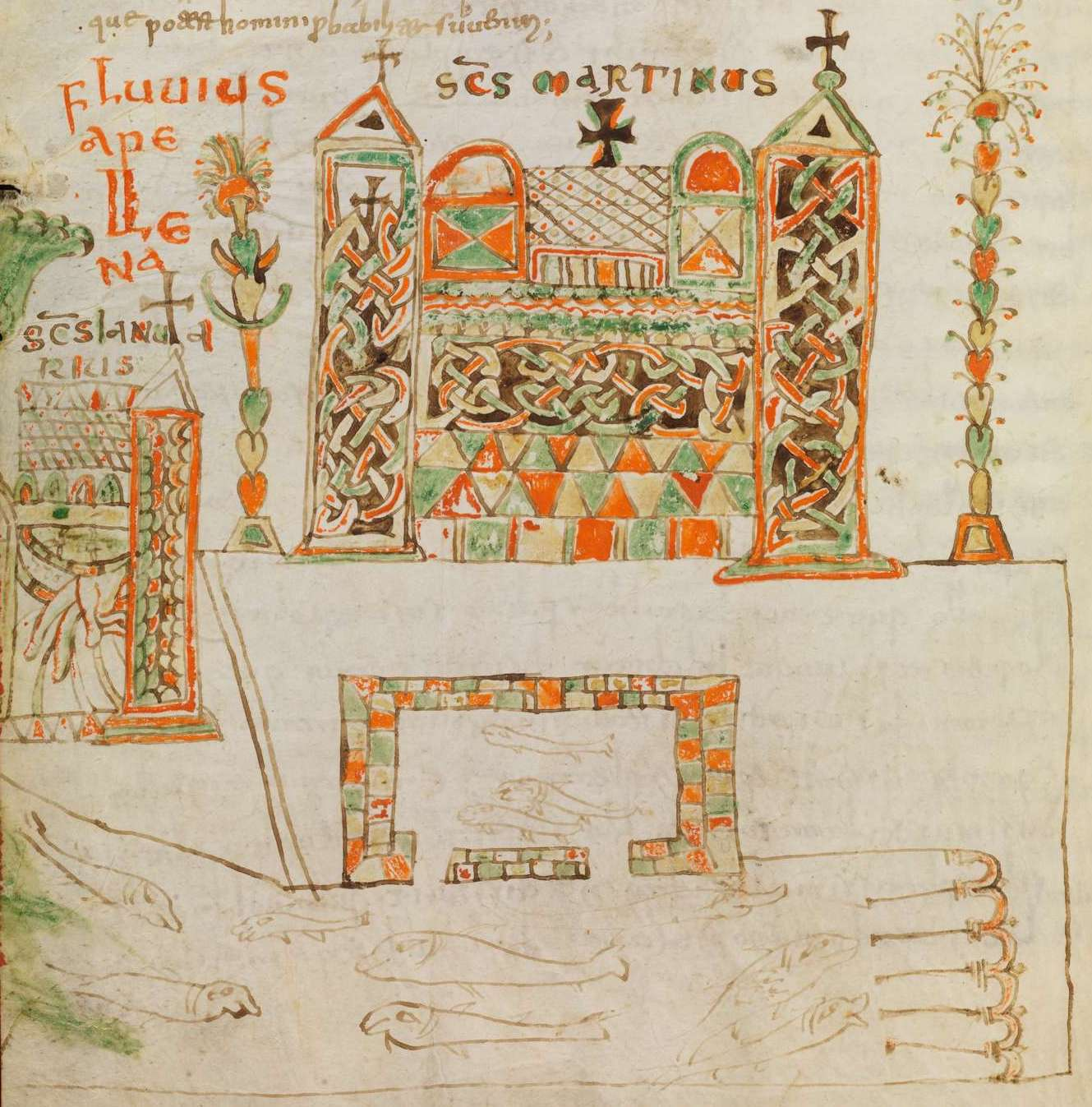
Miniature of the Vivarium monastery from the 7th century

As early as the 1880s, archaeologist François Lenormant had located the Vivarium monastery in the area between the town of Stalettì and the sea, around Copanello Alto. In fact, Cassiodorus described his monastery as being located in a steep, rocky area, which made it impossible to locate it between the mouth of the Alessi river and Catanzaro Lido, since the coast there consisted of nothing more than a long sandy beach. The only likely location was therefore the Stalettì coastline.

In 1938, French historian Pierre Courcelle discovered the remains of an ancient early Christian chapel at Copanello Alto. He surmised that this might be the Chapel of San Martino, the only surviving vestige of early Christian art in Calabria, which adjoined the Vivarium monastery built by Cassiodorus between 535 and 555. He also speculates that the Vivarium Monastery was located on the site of what was then Casa Falcone (formerly Casa Fazzari and later Motel Copanello before becoming the Libero Gatti Naturalist Museum).

The Chapel of San Martino is a small building comprising a nave ending in a three-lobed apse (an apse with a lobe on each side except the one where it is in contact with the nave) adjoining a trapezoidal room containing a sarcophagus with inscriptions in ancient Greek, long mistaken for the tomb of Cassiodorus.

The Vasche di Cassiodoro or Vasche di Copanello are an ancient Roman aquaculture site located on the seafront at the foot of Copanello Alto. They can be reached by a path leading down from Copanello Alto or by another path, now in poor condition, running along the coast from Copanello Lido. Built by Cassiodorus in the 2nd century as fishponds, they consist of three natural basins side by side. They vary in size from 10 to 12 meters long, 4 to 5 meters wide and between 1.50 and 2.50 meters deep on average. It was with Pierre Courcelle that the Vasche di Cassiodoro were definitively recognized as Cassiodorus's fishponds, as they had previously been located in the vicinity of the Grotte di San Gregorio, in the frazione de Caminia di Stalettì.

The Arethusa Fountain (Italian: Fonte Arethusa) is a water source formerly located on Cassiodorus' land. Its existence has come down to us thanks to a letter sent by Cassiodorus, on behalf of King Athalaric, to Severus, corrector of Lucania and Bruttium, in which he complains about peasants having stolen horses from an important traveler named Nymphadius. In the 1930s, French historian Pierre Courcelle located the fountain on the site of today's Fontana di Cassiodoro (Cassiodorus Fountain), adjacent to the Casino Pepe, in the western part of Copanello Lido, near the ancient Roman Via Grande. The fountain no longer has its original appearance, having been transformed into a rustic monument in the 17th century.

== See also ==
- Stalettì
- Scheria
- Cassiodorus
- Pierre Courcelle
- Guglielmo Pepe
- Filippo De Nobili

== Bibliography ==
- Courcelle, Pierre (1938). "Le site du monastère de Cassiodore". Mélanges d'Archéologie et d'Histoire (in French). 55 (1). Le site du monastère de Cassiodore: 259–307. doi:10.3406/mefr.1938.7289.
- Guide d'Italia (2006). Calabria (in French). Touring Club Italiano.
- Gatti, Enzo (1975). Odisseo : il viaggio coloniale di Ulisse (in Italian). Virgilio-Gastaldi.
- Bonofiglio, Adele (2013). La Fontana di Cassiodoro alla Coscia di Staletti (in Italian). Centre for Mediaeval Studies Leonard Boyle. Archived from the original on 17 April 2013.
- Vitale, Maria (2013). Ruderi del complesso di San Martino (in Italian). Catanzaro.
- Arslan, Ermanno (1991). "Ancora da Scolacium a Squillace : dubbi e problemi". Mélanges de l'École française de Rome: Moyen Âge, Temps modernes (in Italian). 103 (2): 461–484. doi:10.3406/mefr.1991.3184.
- Noyé, Ghislaine (1986). "Squillace (Prov. de Catanzaro)". Mélanges de l'École française de Rome: Moyen Âge, Temps modernes (in French). 98 (2): 1195–1212. doi:10.3406/mefr.1986.8608.
