= List of railway stations in Calabria =

This is the list of the railway stations in Calabria owned by Rete Ferroviaria Italiana, a branch of the Italian state company Ferrovie dello Stato.

== List ==
Station	Locality	Province	Category
Acquappesa	Acquappesa	Cosenza	Bronze
Africo Nuovo	Africo Nuovo	Reggio Calabria	Bronze
Amantea	Amantea	Cosenza	Silver
Amendolara-Oriolo	Amendolara	Cosenza	Bronze
Ardore	Ardore	Reggio Calabria	Bronze
Badolato	Badolato	Catanzaro	Bronze
Bagnara	Bagnara Calabra	Reggio Calabria	Silver
Belmonte Calabro	Belmonte Calabro	Cosenza	Bronze
Belvedere Marittimo	Belvedere Marittimo	Cosenza	Bronze
Bianco	Bianco	Reggio Calabria	Silver
Botricello	Botricello	Catanzaro	Bronze
Bova Marina	Bova Marina	Reggio Calabria	Silver
Bovalino	Bovalino	Reggio Calabria	Silver
Brancaleone	Brancaleone	Reggio Calabria	Silver
Briatico	Briatico	Vibo Valentia	Bronze
Calopezzati	Calopezzati	Cosenza	Bronze
Campora San Giovanni-Serra Aiello	Campora San Giovanni	Cosenza	Bronze
Capo Bonifati	Bonifati	Cosenza	Bronze
Cariati	Cariati	Cosenza	Bronze
Castiglione Cosentino	Castiglione Cosentino	Cosenza	Silver
Catanzaro	Catanzaro	Catanzaro	Silver
Catanzaro Lido	Catanzaro	Catanzaro	Gold
Caulonia	Caulonia	Reggio Calabria	Bronze
Cetraro	Cetraro	Cosenza	Bronze
Cirò	Cirò	Crotone	Bronze
Condofuri	Condofuri	Reggio Calabria	Bronze
Corigliano Calabro	Corigliano Calabro	Cosenza	Bronze
Cosenza	Cosenza	Cosenza	Silver
Cropani	Cropani	Catanzaro	Bronze
Crotone	Crotone	Crotone	Silver
Crucoli	Crucoli	Crotone	Bronze
Curinga	Curinga	Catanzaro	Bronze
Cutro	Cutro	Crotone	Bronze
Diamante-Buonvicino	Diamante	Cosenza	Silver
Falerna	Falerna	Catanzaro	Bronze
Favazzina	Favazzina	Calabria	Bronze
Ferruzzano	Ferruzzano	Reggio Calabria	Bronze
Fiumefreddo Bruzio	Fiumefreddo Bruzio	Cosenza	Bronze
Francavilla Angitola-Filadelfia	Francavilla Angitola	Vibo Valentia	Silver
Fuscaldo	Fuscaldo	Cosenza	Bronze
Gioia Tauro	Gioia Tauro	Reggio Calabria	Silver
Gioiosa Jonica	Gioiosa Ionica	Reggio Calabria	Silver
Grisolia-Santa Maria	Grisolia	Cosenza	Bronze
Guardavalle	Guardavalle	Catanzaro	Bronze
Guardia Piemontese Terme	Guardia Piemontese	Cosenza	Bronze
Joppolo	Joppolo	Vibo Valentia	Bronze
Lamezia Terme Centrale	Lamezia Terme	Catanzaro	Gold
Lamezia Terme Nicastro	Lamezia Terme	Catanzaro	Silver
Lamezia Terme Sambiase	Lamezia Terme	Catanzaro	Bronze
Locri	Locri	Reggio Calabria	Silver
Longobardi	Longobardi	Cosenza	Bronze
Mandatoriccio-Campana	Mandatoriccio	Cosenza	Bronze
Marcellinara	Marcellinara	Catanzaro	Bronze
Marcellina-Verbicaro-Orsomarso	Marcellina	Cosenza	Bronze
Marina di San Lorenzo	Marina di San Lorenzo	Reggio Calabria	Bronze
Melito di Porto Salvo	Melito di Porto Salvo	Reggio Calabria	Silver
Mileto	Mileto	Vibo Valentia	Bronze
Mirto-Crosia	Crosia	Cosenza	Bronze
Monasterace-Stilo	Monasterace	Reggio Calabria	Bronze
Mongrassano-Cervicati	Mongrassano	Cosenza	Bronze
Montegiordano	Montegiordano	Cosenza	Bronze
Montepaone-Montauro	Montepaone	Catanzaro	Bronze
Motta San Giovanni-Lazzaro	Motta San Giovanni	Reggio Calabria	Bronze
Nicotera	Nicotera	Vibo Valentia	Bronze
Nocera Terinese	Nocera Terinese	Catanzaro	Bronze
Palizzi	Palizzi	Reggio Calabria	Bronze
Palmi	Palmi	Reggio Calabria	Bronze
Paola	Paola	Cosenza	Gold
Parghelia	Parghelia	Vibo Valentia	Bronze
Pizzo	Pizzo	Vibo Valentia	Bronze
Praja-Ajeta-Tortora	Praia a Mare	Cosenza	Silver
Reggio Calabria Archi	Reggio Calabria	Reggio Calabria	Bronze
Reggio Calabria Bocale	Reggio Calabria	Reggio Calabria	Bronze
Reggio Calabria Catona	Reggio Calabria	Reggio Calabria	Bronze
Reggio Calabria Centrale	Reggio Calabria	Reggio Calabria	Gold
Reggio Calabria Gallico	Reggio Calabria	Reggio Calabria	Bronze
Reggio Calabria Lido	Reggio Calabria	Reggio Calabria	Silver
Reggio Calabria Omeca	Reggio Calabria	Reggio Calabria	Bronze
Reggio Calabria Pellaro	Reggio Calabria	Reggio Calabria	Silver
Reggio Calabria Santa Caterina	Reggio Calabria	Reggio Calabria	Bronze
Reggio Calabria San Gregorio	Reggio Calabria	Reggio Calabria	Bronze
Riace	Riace	Reggio Calabria	Bronze
Ricadi	Ricadi	Vibo Valentia	Bronze
Rocca Imperiale	Rocca Imperiale	Cosenza	Bronze
Roccella Jonica	Roccella Ionica	Reggio Calabria	Silver
Rosarno	Rosarno	Reggio Calabria	Silver
Roseto Capo Spulico	Roseto Capo Spulico	Cosenza	Bronze
Rossano	Rossano	Cosenza	Bronze
Sant'Andrea dello Jonio	Sant'Andrea Apostolo dello Ionio	Catanzaro	Bronze
Santa Caterina dello Jonio	Santa Caterina dello Ionio	Catanzaro	Bronze
Santa Domenica	Santa Domenica	Vibo Valentia	Bronze
San Lucido Marina	San Lucido	Cosenza	Bronze
San Marco-Roggiano	San Marco Argentano	Cosenza	Bronze
San Pietro a Maida-Maida	San Pietro a Maida	Catanzaro	Bronze
Saline di Reggio	Saline Joniche	Reggio Calabria	Bronze
Scalea-Santa Domenica Talao	Scalea	Cosenza	Silver
Scilla	Scilla	Reggio Calabria	Silver
Sibari	Sibari	Cosenza	Silver
Siderno	Siderno	Reggio Calabria	Silver
Soverato	Soverato	Catanzaro	Silver
Spezzano Albanese Terme	Spezzano Albanese	Cosenza	Bronze
Squillace	Squillace	Catanzaro	Bronze
Strongoli	Strongoli	Crotone	Bronze
Tarsia	Tarsia	Cosenza	Bronze
Torano-Lattarico	Torano Castello	Cosenza	Bronze
Torre Melissa	Melissa	Crotone	Bronze
Torremezzo di Falconara	Falconara Albanese	Cosenza	Bronze
Trebisacce	Trebisacce	Cosenza	Silver
Tropea	Tropea	Vibo Valentia	Silver
Vibo Marina	Vibo Valentia	Vibo Valentia	Silver
Vibo Valentia-Pizzo	Vibo Valentia	Vibo Valentia	Silver
Villa San Giovanni	Villa San Giovanni	Reggio Calabria	Gold
Villa San Giovanni Cannitello	Villa San Giovanni	Reggio Calabria	Bronze
Villapiana Lido	Villapiana	Calabria	Bronze
Villapiana-Torre Cerchiara	Villapiana	Calabria	Bronze
Zambrone	Zambrone	Vibo Valentia	Silver

== See also ==
- Railway stations in Italy
- Ferrovie dello Stato
- Rail transport in Italy
- High-speed rail in Italy
- Transport in Italy
