= Reggio di Calabria Pentimele railway station =

Railway station in Italy

Reggio di Calabria Pentimele

General information
- Location: Via Vecchia Archi, Reggio Calabria; Italy
- Coordinates: 38°08′30″N 15°39′28″E
- System: Commuter and regional station
- Owner: Rete Ferroviaria Italiana
- Line: Battipaglia–Reggio di Calabria
- Platforms: 2 side platforms
- Tracks: 2
- Train operators: Trenitalia
- Connections: ATAM buses

Construction
- Structure type: Elevated
- Accessible: yes

History
- Opened: June 12, 2016; 10 years ago
Location
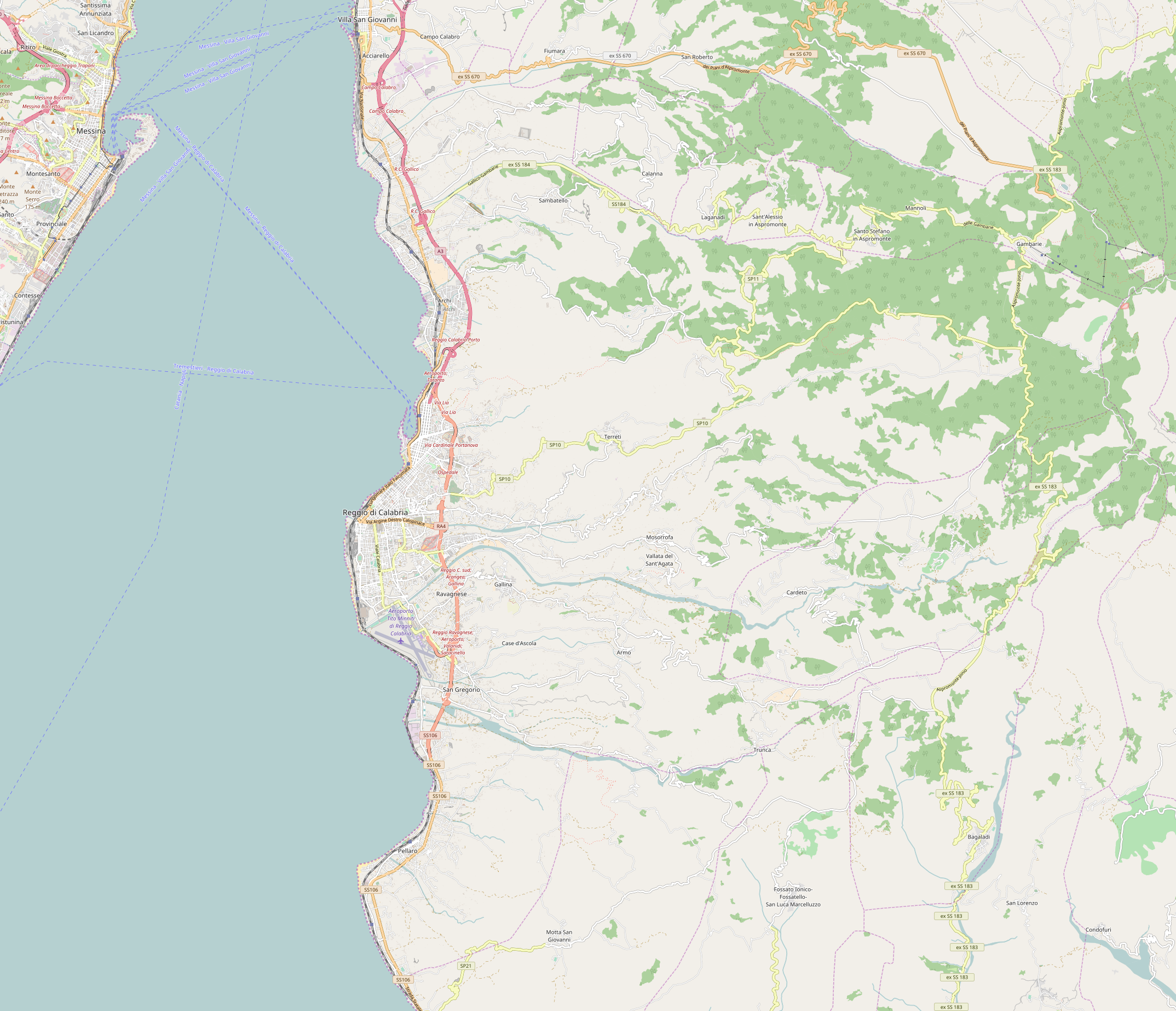
- Location within Reggio Calabria

Reggio di Calabria Pentimele railway station (Italian: Stazione di Reggio di Calabria Pentimele) is a railway station of the Italian city of Reggio Calabria, Calabria. Part of the Battipaglia–Reggio di Calabria railway, it serves the quartiere of Pentimele and the indoor sporting arena PalaCalafiore.

== History ==
The project of the station, realized by the company Italferr, was approved in 2009 by the Province of Reggio Calabria, together with the projects of other five stations located in the Reggio Calabria metropolitan area. Works began in 2015 and the station was finally opened on June 12, 2016.

== Layout ==
P	Side platform, doors will open on the right
Platform level	Northbound	← toward Battipaglia (Reggio di Calabria Archi)
	Southbound	toward Reggio di Calabria Centrale (Reggio di Calabria Santa Caterina) →
	Side platform, doors will open on the right
G	Street Level	Underpass, stairs and ramps

The station has two tracks and two side platforms, which are connected each other and with the street by an underpass and a series of stairs and ramps. Also, the two platforms are covered with steel shelters and 16 speakers and 2 displays provide information to passengers.

== Services and connections ==
The station is served by regional and suburban trains operated by Trenitalia, connecting the station with the other stations of the city and of its suburbs. During weekdays the station in served by 21 trains, during weekend by 8 trains. The urban buses operated by ATAM stop outside the station.

== See also ==
- List of railway stations in Calabria
