= Mileto railway station =

Railway station in Italy

Mileto

General information
- Location: Via Dottolella, Mileto; Italy
- Coordinates: 38°34′37.98″N 16°03′35.29″E
- Elevation: 135 MSL
- System: Regional station
- Owner: Rete Ferroviaria Italiana
- Line: Battipaglia–Reggio di Calabria
- Distance: 300 km from Battipaglia
- Platforms: 2 side platforms, 1 island platform
- Tracks: 4
- Train operators: Trenitalia

Construction
- Structure type: At-grade

Other information
- Classification: Bronze

History
- Opened: 1972; 54 years ago
Services
Preceding station	Trenitalia	Following station
Vibo Valentia-Pizzo towards Cosenza	Regionale	Rosarno towards Reggio di Calabria Centrale
Vibo Valentia-Pizzo towards Lamezia Terme Centrale	Regionale	Rosarno towards Reggio di Calabria Centrale
Location
- Location within Calabria Location within Italy

Mileto railway station (Italian: Stazione di Mileto) is a railway station of the Italian city of Mileto, Calabria, part of the Battipaglia–Reggio di Calabria railway. Is located in the frazione of Paravati.

== History ==
The station was built during the late 1960s as part of the variant direttissima between Rosarno railway station and Lamezia Terme Centrale railway station. It was opened in 1972.

== Layout ==
The station has four tracks, two side platforms and one island platform, which are connected each other with an underpass. The station building has no service due to lack of passengers.

== Services ==
As of the December 2023 timetable change, the following services stop at Mileto:

- Regionale: services to Reggio di Calabria Centrale, Lamezia Terme Centrale, and Cosenza.
