= Villa San Giovanni railway station =

Railway station in Villa San Giovanni, Italy

Villa San Giovanni

General information
- Location: Piazza Stazione; 89018 Villa San Giovanni RC; Villa San Giovanni, Reggio Calabria, Calabria; Italy
- Coordinates: 38°12′59.76″N 15°38′03.84″E
- Operator: Rete Ferroviaria Italiana; Centostazioni
- Line: Battipaglia–Reggio di Calabria
- Distance: 360.102 km (223.757 mi) from Battipaglia
- Train operators: Trenitalia
- Connections: Urban and suburban buses; Ferries to Sicily

Construction
- Architect: Roberto Narducci

Other information
- Classification: Gold

History
- Opened: 19 May 1884; 142 years ago
- Rebuilt: 1937

Services
Preceding station	Trenitalia	Following station
Gioia Tauro towards Milano Centrale	InterCity Notte; Milan–Syracuse	Messina Centrale via train ferry towards Siracusa
Location
- Location within Calabria Location within Italy

Villa San Giovanni railway station (Italian: Stazione di Villa San Giovanni) is the main railway station serving the town and comune of Villa San Giovanni, in the region of Calabria, southern Italy. It opened in 1884, and it forms part of the Battipaglia–Reggio di Calabria railway.

The station is currently managed by Rete Ferroviaria Italiana (RFI). However, the commercial area of the passenger building is managed by Centostazioni. The station's main line train services are operated by or on behalf of Trenitalia. Each of these companies is a subsidiary of Ferrovie dello Stato (FS), Italy's state-owned rail company.

As the main point of arrival and departure of rail passengers between the mainland and Sicily, the station is a rail facility of national importance. In terms of passenger movements, it is the second busiest station in the Reggio Calabria urban area, and one of the busiest in the region. Additionally, it is a transit point for all of the goods transported by rail between the mainland and Sicily.

== Location ==
Villa San Giovanni railway station is situated at Piazza Stazione, at the western edge of the town centre. It occupies Villa San Giovanni's waterfront area, between the town centre and the ferry terminal for ferries to Sicily.

== History ==
The station was opened on 20 May 1884, together with the rest of the 12 km (7.5 mi) long section of the Southern Tyrrhenian railway between Reggio Calabria Lido (then named Reggio Calabria Succursale) and Villa San Giovanni.

Soon afterwards, the construction company, the Società Vittorio Emanuele, handed over the facility to the new Società per le Strade Ferrate del Mediterraneo (English: Company for the Mediterranean Railways). The latter company eventually completed the Southern Tyrrhenian railway in 1895. In that year, the importance of the station grew significantly, because for travellers coming from Sicily it was more convenient to take a ferry straight to Villa San Giovanni than to travel, as before, via the port of Reggio Calabria. On 1 March 1905, the station was connected by a new short railway with the Villa ferry port. This development facilitated the introduction of ferry services carrying railway rolling stock.

As time went on, the importance of Villa San Giovanni gradually increased, to the detriment of Reggio Calabria, as the Tyrrhenian rail route to central and northern Italy was shorter than the alternative route via the Jonica railway. Movement of rail traffic across the Strait of Messina was also increased and strengthened by the introduction of Villesi cradles. The passenger building was built in 1937, as a project of architect Roberto Narducci.

== Services ==
As of the December 2023 timetable change, the following services stop at Villa San Giovanni:

- Frecciarossa: services to Torino Porta Nuova, Venezia Santa Lucia, and Reggio di Calabria Centrale.
- Frecciargento/InterCity: services between Reggio di Calabria Centrale and Roma Termini.
- Intercity Notte: services to Milano Centrale, Siracusa, and Torino Porta Nuova.
- Regionale: services to Reggio di Calabria Centrale, Lamezia Terme Centrale, and Cosenza.

== Features ==
Six tracks at the station are used for passenger services. The goods yard is very large, and its sidings are arranged into three distinct groups.

== Interchange ==
The station has a bus terminus for ATAM and Costa Viola buses. It also offers interchange with ferries to Sicily.

== Images ==
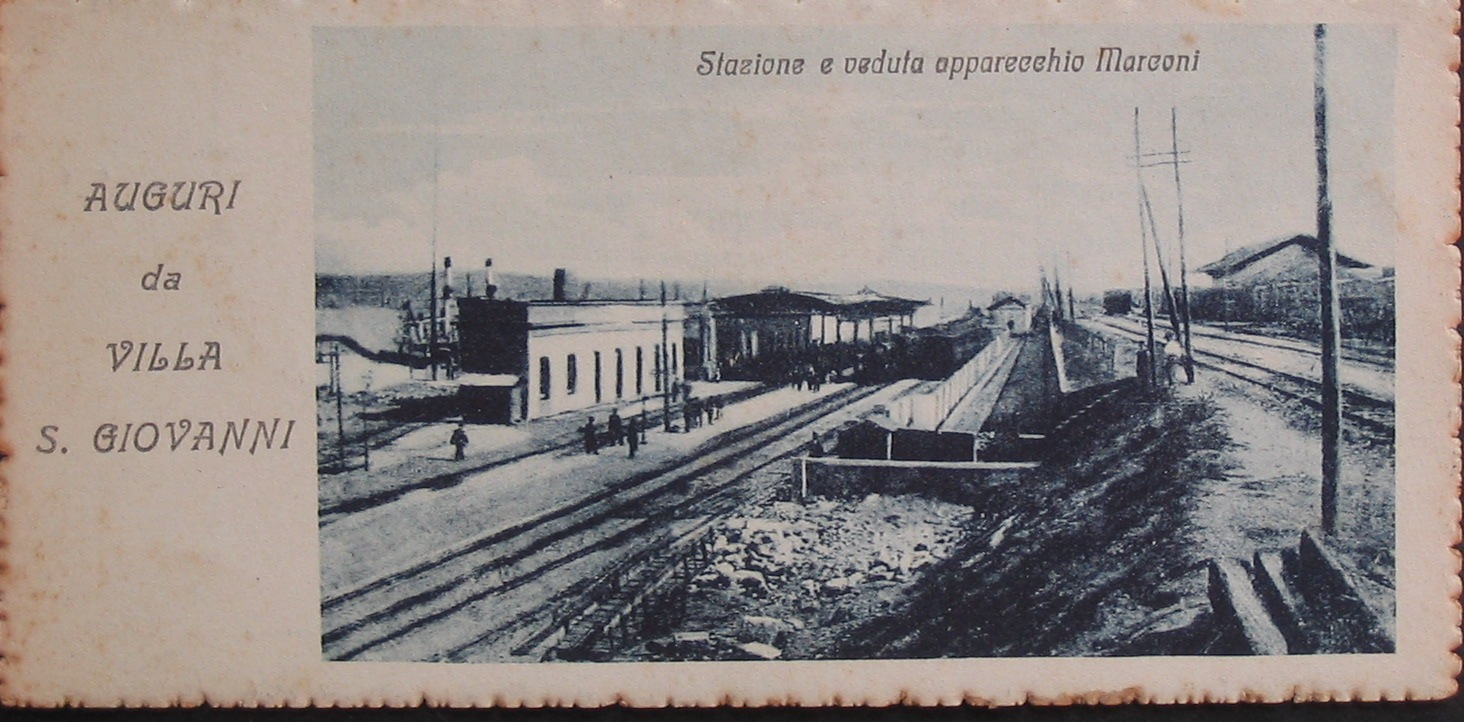
The station depicted in a 1906 postcard.

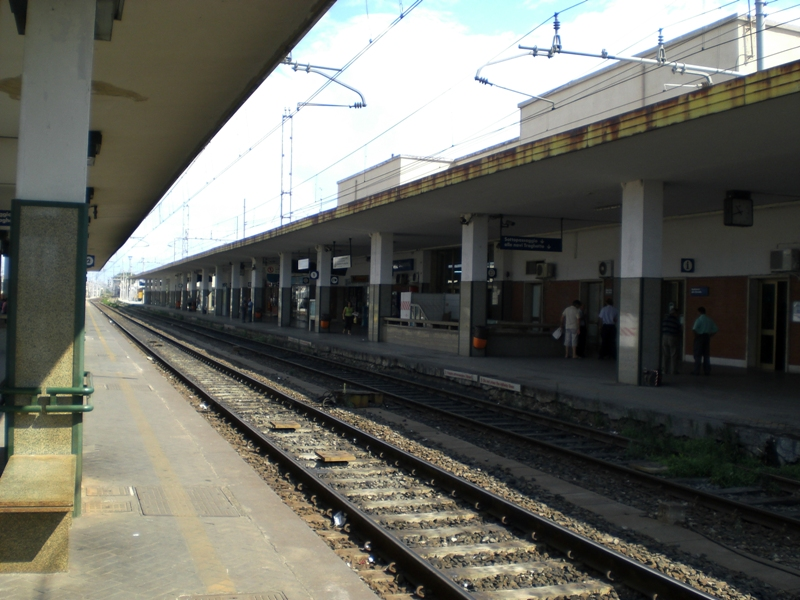
View of track 1.

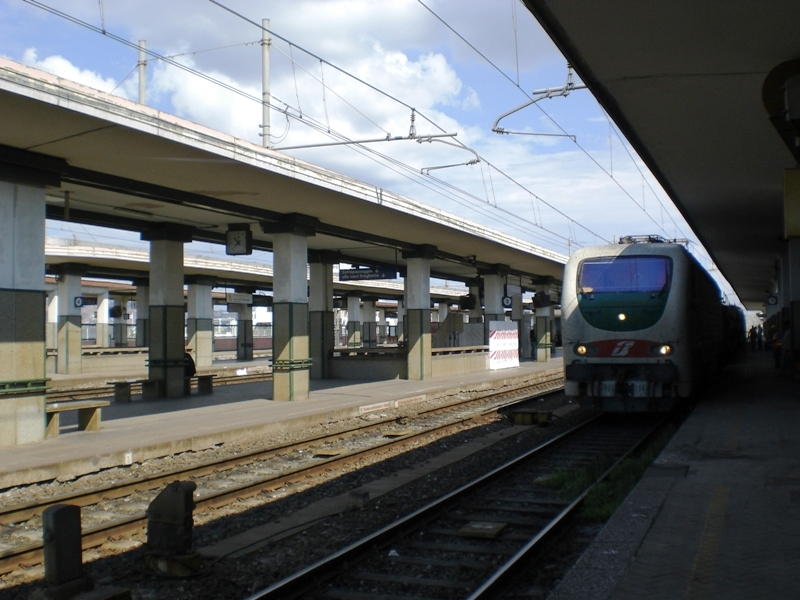
View of the platform shelters

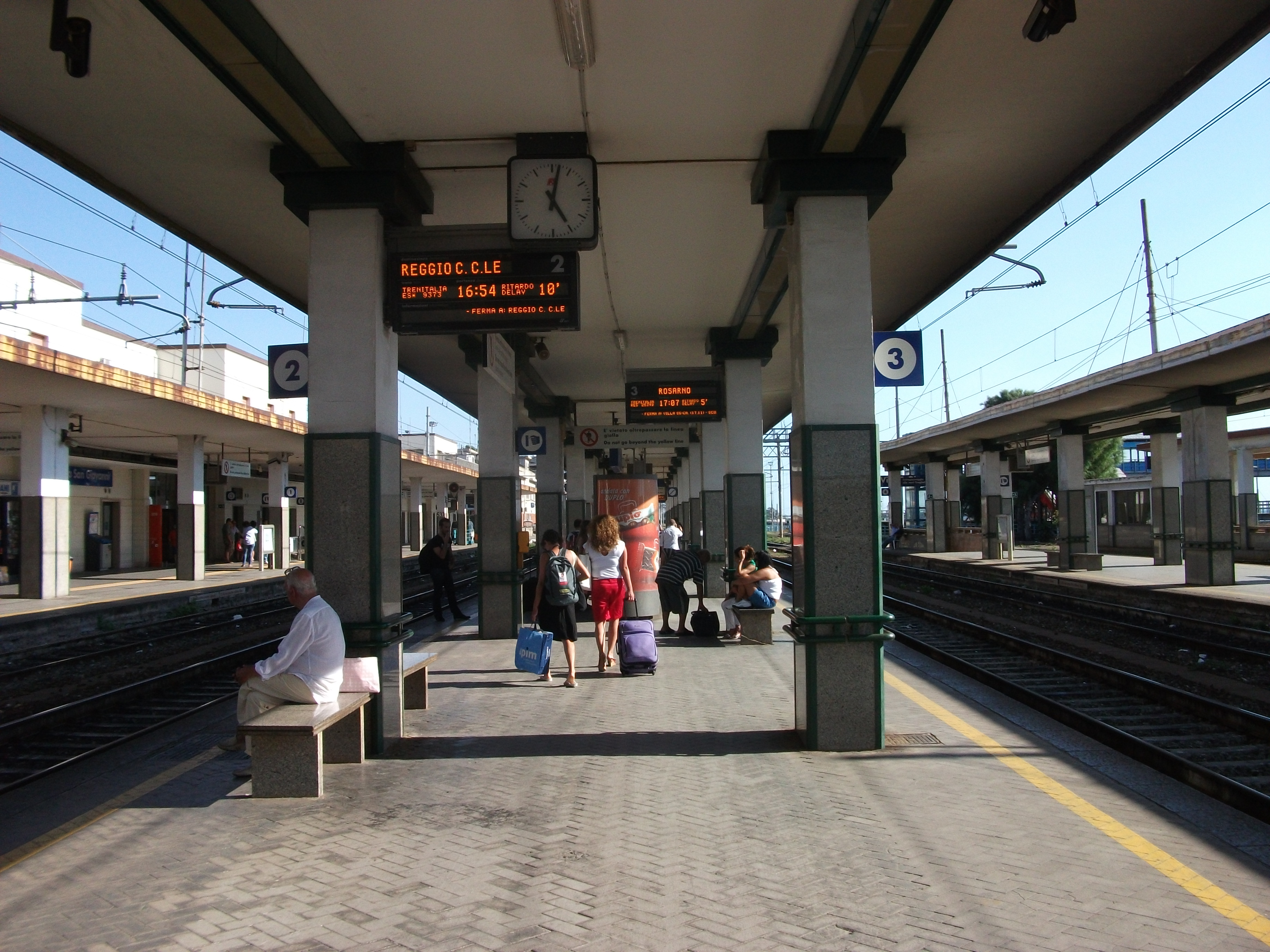
Overall view of the platform for tracks 2–3.

== See also ==
- Reggio Calabria Centrale railway station
- History of rail transport in Italy
- List of railway stations in Calabria
- Rail transport in Italy
- Railway stations in Italy
