= Paola railway station =

Railway station in Italy

Paola
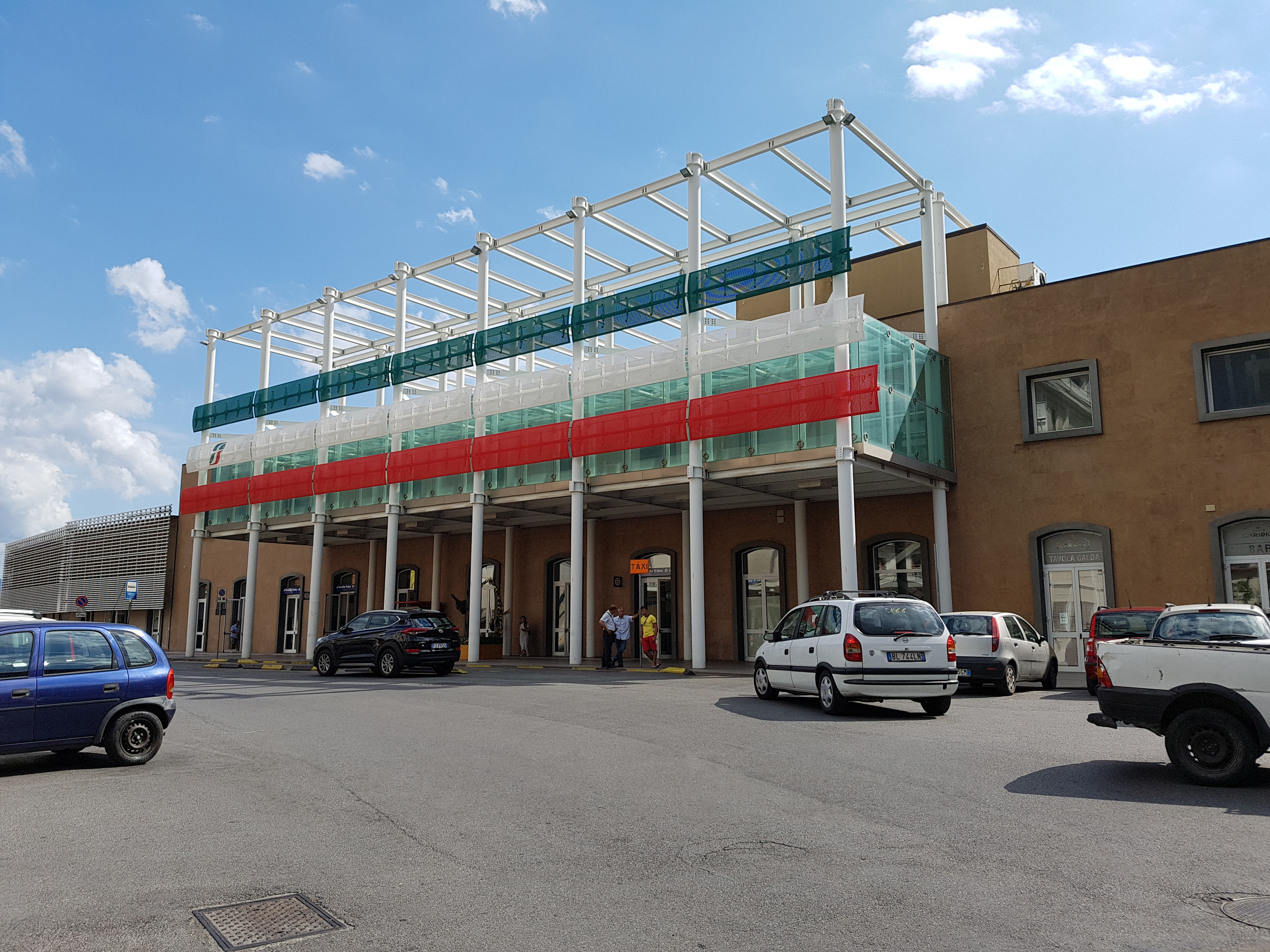

General information
- Location: Viale Stazione; 87027 Paola CS; Paola, Cosenza, Calabria; Italy
- Coordinates: 39°21′34″N 16°01′59″E
- Operator: Rete Ferroviaria Italiana
- Lines: Battipaglia–Reggio Calabria; Paola–Cosenza
- Distance: 197.001 km (122.411 mi) from Battipaglia
- Platforms: 6
- Train operators: Trenitalia
- Connections: Urban buses

Other information
- Classification: Gold

History
- Opened: 31 July 1895; 131 years ago

Services
Preceding station	Trenitalia	Following station
Scalea–Santa Domenica Talao towards Milano Centrale	InterCity Notte; Milan–Syracuse	Amantea towards Siracusa
Location
- Location within Calabria Location within Italy

Paola railway station (Italian: Stazione di Paola) serves the town and comune of Paola, in the Calabria region, southern Italy. Opened in 1895, it forms part of the Battipaglia–Reggio di Calabria railway, and is also a terminus of a secondary line, the Paola–Cosenza railway.

The station is currently managed by Rete Ferroviaria Italiana (RFI). Train services are operated by or on behalf of Trenitalia. Each of these companies is a subsidiary of Ferrovie dello Stato (FS), Italy's state-owned rail company.

== Location ==
Paola railway station is situated in Viale Stazione, at the western edge of the city centre, near the waterfront.

== History ==
The station was opened on 15 November 1894, together with the rest of the final section of the Battipaglia–Reggio di Calabria railway was completed, between Praja-Ajeta-Tortora and Gizzeria Lido (then known as Sant'Eufemia Marina), via Scalea, Cetraro, Paola and Amantea. Management of the station and the line was initially entrusted to the Società per le Strade Ferrate del Mediterraneo (English: Company for the Railways of the Mediterranean).

Between 1907 and 1911, construction began on the Paola–Cosenza railway, which was intended to provide the coveted rail link between Cosenza and the Southern Tyrrhenian railway. It was opened on 2 August 1915, and significantly increased the importance of Paola station. The line to Cosenza started from track 1 at Paola, and headed initially in a southerly direction. It continued alongside the main line for about 1 km (0.62 mi), and then curved to the east to enter a section equipped with a Strub rack system.

At about the same time as the new line to Cosenza was opened, the Paola Locomotive Depot was constructed adjacent to the station. The depot was in service until about the end of the twentieth century.

== Features ==
The station was built on an artificial embankment raised to protect it from the frequent storms of the Tyrrhenian Sea. Originally very small, the passenger building was later rebuilt and enlarged with a number of service buildings, following the construction of the line to Cosenza. The present passenger building is linear in style and has two levels.

In the station yard, there are four platforms equipped with shelters and connected with each other by a pedestrian underpass. Track 1 and the track 1 bay platform are on the mountain side of the station, and are normally used by passenger trains departing for the line to Cosenza.

Adjacent to the station on the south-west was the site of the locomotive depot, which was connected with the station by a link from track 6. To the west, between the station and the beach, there are goods tracks passing through the station, while to the north-east is a small group of sidings for the loading and unloading of goods. There is also a large Ferrotel, built alongside the station in 1970 for the accommodation of visiting railway staff.

== See also ==
- History of rail transport in Italy
- List of railway stations in Calabria
- Rail transport in Italy
- Railway stations in Italy
