= Agropoli–Castellabate railway station =

Railway station in Campania, Italy

Agropoli–Castellabate
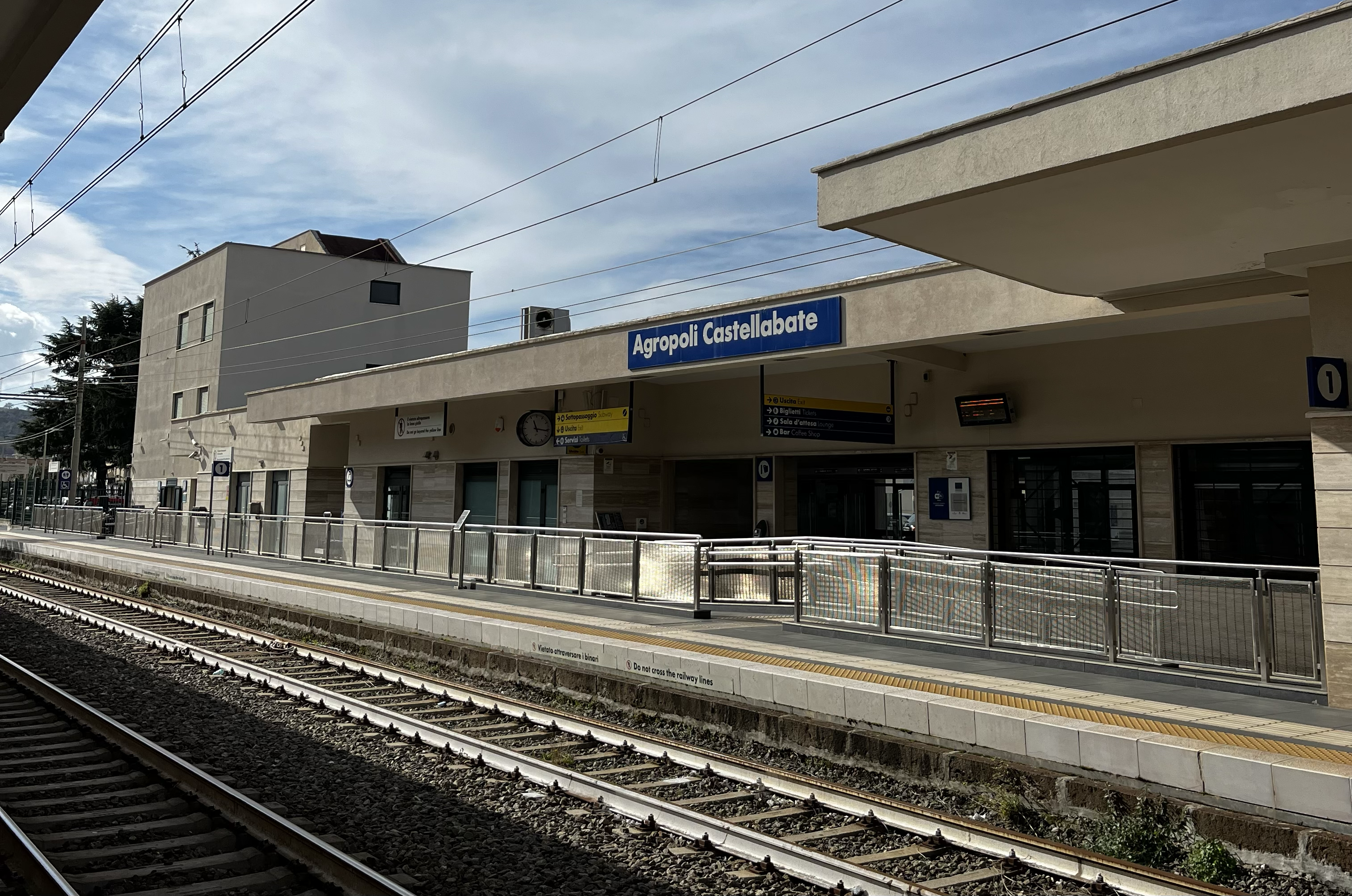

General information
- Location: Agropoli, Province of Salerno, Campania; Italy
- Coordinates: 40°21′05.04″N 15°00′05.76″E
- Owner: Rete Ferroviaria Italiana
- Operator: Trenitalia
- Line: Salerno–Reggio Calabria railway

History
- Opened: 1883

Services
Preceding station	Trenitalia	Following station
Battipaglia towards Milano Centrale	InterCity Notte; Milan–Syracuse	Vallo della Lucania–Castelnuovo towards Siracusa
Location
- Location within Campania Location within Italy

Agropoli-Castellabate is a railway station of the Salerno–Reggio Calabria railway serving the municipalities of Agropoli and Castellabate.

== Operations ==
The station is served by regional trains run by Trenitalia under contract to the Campania Region and by long-distance connections carried out by Trenitalia eNTV.
