= Vibo Valentia–Pizzo railway station =

Railway station in Italy

Vibo Valentia–Pizzo

General information
- Location: Via Stazione, Vibo Valentia; Italy
- Coordinates: 38°42′52.88″N 16°08′23.5″E
- Elevation: 147 MSL
- Owner: Rete Ferroviaria Italiana
- Line: Battipaglia–Reggio di Calabria
- Distance: 282 km from Battipaglia
- Platforms: 2 side platforms, 1 island platform
- Tracks: 4
- Train operators: Trenitalia
- Connections: Buses, taxi

Construction
- Structure type: At-grade

Other information
- Classification: Silver

History
- Opened: 1972; 54 years ago

Services
Preceding station	Trenitalia	Following station
Lamezia Terme Centrale towards Milano Centrale	InterCity Notte; Milan–Syracuse	Rosarno towards Siracusa
Location
- Location within Calabria Location within Italy

Vibo Valentia–Pizzo railway station (Italian: Stazione di Vibo Valentia–Pizzo) is the main railway station of the Italian city of Vibo Valentia, Calabria. It is part of the Battipaglia–Reggio di Calabria railway.

== History ==
The station was built during the late 1960s as part of the variant direttissima between Rosarno railway station and Lamezia Terme Centrale railway station. It was opened in 1972. Previously the city was served by the Vibo Marina railway station, located in the frazione of the same name.

== Layout ==
The station has four tracks, two side platforms, and one island platform, which are connected to each other with an underpass. The station building features a waiting room, a ticket office, a ticket machine area, and toilets.

== Services ==
As of the December 2023 timetable change, the following services stop at Vibo Valentia-Pizzo:

- Frecciarossa: services to Torino Porta Nuova, Venezia Santa Lucia, and Reggio di Calabria Centrale.
- Frecciargento / InterCity: services between Reggio di Calabria Centrale and Roma Termini.
- Intercity Notte: service between Milano Centrale and Siracusa.
- Regionale: services to Reggio di Calabria Centrale, Lamezia Terme Centrale, and Cosenza.
