= Monasterace–Stilo railway station =

Railway station in Italy

Monasterace–Stilo
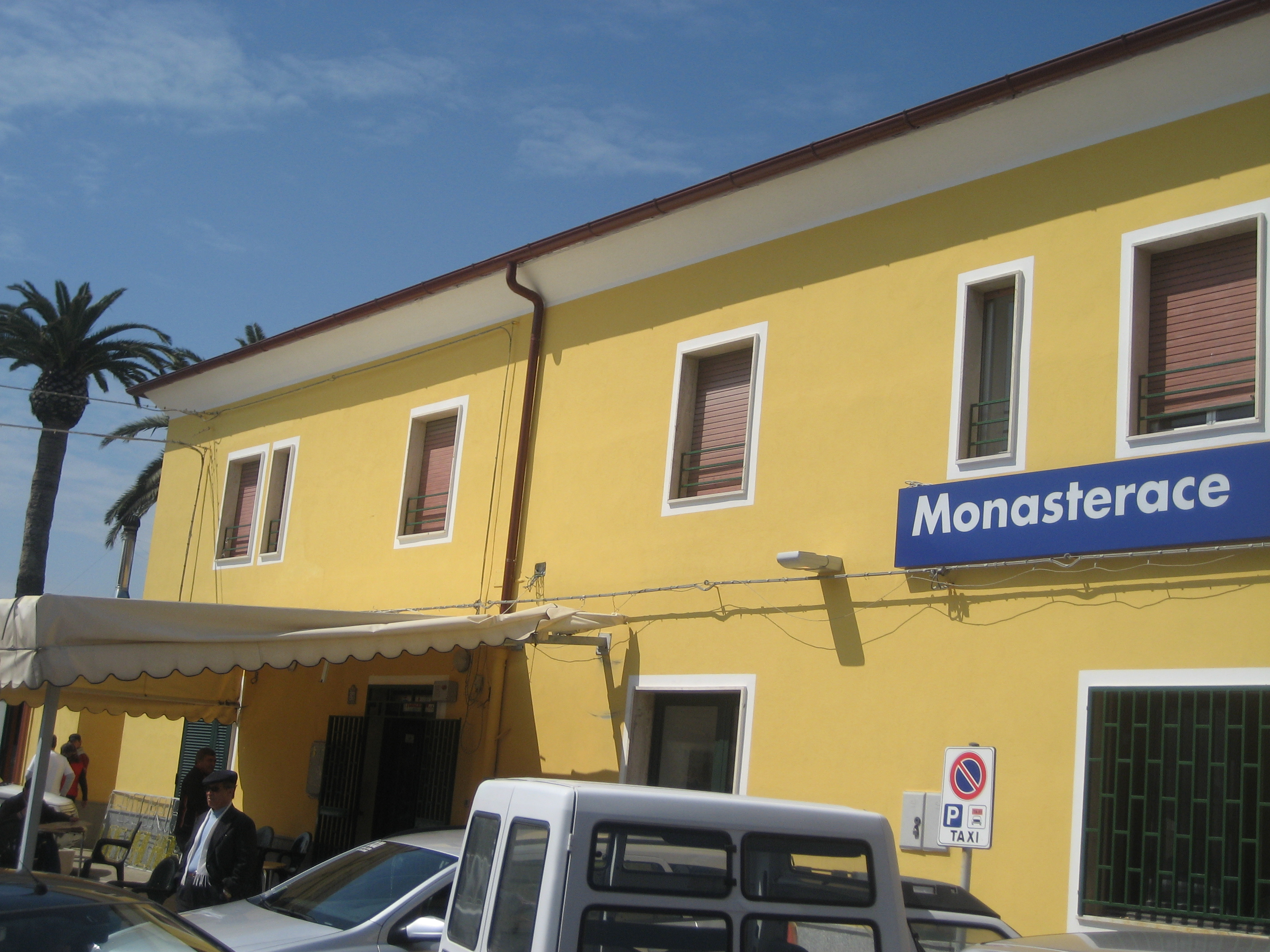

General information
- Location: Piazza Stazione; Monasterace, Reggio Calabria, Calabria; Italy
- Coordinates: 38°26′13″N 16°34′27″E
- Operator: Rete Ferroviaria Italiana
- Lines: Jonica railway Lamezia Terme–Catanzaro Lido
- Platforms: 3
- Train operators: Trenitalia
- Connections: Regional buses
Location
- Location within Calabria Location within Italy

Monasterace–Stilo (Italian: Stazione di Monasterace–Stilo) is a railway station in Monasterace, Italy. The station is located on the Jonica railway. The train services are operated by Trenitalia.

== Train services ==
The station is served by the following service(s):

- Intercity services Taranto - Sibari - Crotone - Catanzaro Lido - Roccella Jonica - Reggio Calabria
- Regional services (Treno regionale) Catanzaro Lido - Roccella Jonica - Reggio di Calabria
