= Gioia Tauro railway station =

Railway station in Italy

Gioia Tauro

General information
- Location: Gioia Tauro, Metropolitan City of Reggio Calabria, Calabria; Italy
- Coordinates: 38°25′25.84″N 15°53′50.25″E
- Owner: Rete Ferroviaria Italiana
- Operator: Trenitalia
- Line: Salerno–Reggio Calabria railway

History
- Opened: 1887

Services
Preceding station	Trenitalia	Following station
Rosarno towards Milano Centrale	InterCity Notte; Milan–Syracuse	Villa San Giovanni towards Siracusa
Location
- Location within Calabria Location within Italy

Gioia Tauro is a railway station owned by Rete Ferroviaria Italiana located in the municipality of Gioia Tauro. It is located on the Salerno–Reggio Calabria railway line.

== History ==
The opening of the Gioia Tauro station is linked to the completion of the Reggio-Battipaglia railway section, which took place late due to the bankruptcy of the Calabro-Sicule railways company. The order to continue the work was given by the government to the Society for the Mediterranean Railways but it was necessary to wait for the law of reorganization of the railways and the conventions of 1885 (which entrusted the network to the aforementioned company) for them to restart the projects. Between 1883 and 1887, only the Battipaglia-Agropoli-Castelnuovo Vallo route and Reggio Calabria-Bagnara were activated. In 1887 the route of the railway in the stretch between Nicotera and Gioia Tauro was completed with the construction of a temporary station and in 1888 the station was joined to Bagnara. Only in 1895, after 20 years of work, the Battipaglia-Paola-Reggio Calabria Tyrrhenian railway was completely completed and Gioia Tauro had its station connected to the national network.

Even before the completion of the normal gauge network, various territorial instances of the Taurense had requested, according to the Baccarini Law, the construction of a narrow railway for the interior, but only in the years between 1917 and 1928 the station was enriched with the two directions for Sinopoli and Cinquefrondi with a terminal adjacent to the first platform to which the Ferrovie della Calabria station (once Mediterranea Calabro Lucane) is the head.

In the 1960s, following the execution of the doubling of the tracks, the station building was also rebuilt and the track square was expanded.

== Services ==
=== National transport ===
The station is served by InterCity, InterCity Notte, Frecciargento and Frecciarossa trains, which connect the airport with Lamezia Terme, Paola, Sapri, Salerno, Naples, Rome, Florence, Bologna, Milan, Turin, Villa San Giovanni, Reggio Calabria and Sicily.

=== Regional transport ===
The station is served by Regionale trains that connect Gioia Tauro with:

Reggio Calabria Central Rosarno Melito of Porto Salvo Lamezia Terme Centrale (via Tropea) Paola Cosenza (via Paola) Sibari (via Paola-Cosenza)
