= Monte Santomarco Tunnel =

Santomarco
- Location within Italy

Overview
- Location: Calabria, Italy
- Coordinates: 39°21′49.65″N 16°07′55.57″E
- Status: Active

Operation
- Work began: March 1966
- Opened: May 31, 1987
- Owner: Ferrovie dello Stato Italiane
- Operator: Rete Ferroviaria Italiana

Technical
- Length: 15,333 m (50,305 ft)
- No. of tracks: 1 single track tunnel
- Track gauge: 1435mm
- Electrified: 3 kV DC

Monte Santomarco is a railway tunnel in the Calabria region of Italy. The electrified (3 kV DC) line is 15,333 m long and was opened in 1987 replacing a standard-gauge rack railway line. It is a single track tunnel on the Paola-Cosenza line with a passing loop in the middle, about 800 metres long.

== History ==
In 1905 the Ferrovie dello Stato (Italian State Railways) looked into building a railway connection between Cosenza and Paola; to overcome the steep slopes (the southern coastal chain had to be crossed) the normal gauge was adopted with a rack railway and a maximum slope of 75 feet per thousand. Work began between 1907 and 1911, with the line opening on August 2, 1915. Steam locomotives equipped with a gear wheel were used. In 1937 the FS ALn 56 railcar, expressly designed for the cogwheel line, made it possible to reduce the travel of passenger trains to 90 minutes. However, already by the end of the 1930s the troublesome maintenance problems and the excessive travel time pushed the FS to design a new line, however the start of construction for the new track was delayed, in part by the Second World War. The Ministry of Public Works project envisaged a route with a tunnel of approximately 17km with maximum slopes of 18 feet per thousand and radii of curvatures of at least 300 meters, with a new station in Cosenza and electrification of the line. The planned expenditure for the work was around 20bn lire.

In March 1966 construction work began on the new line, and the excavation of the long tunnel. The closure of the railway operation on the old section took place on April 28, 1987 while the new section, electrified, opened for operation on May 31, 1987. The tunnel is Km 15+333 long, starting at km 1+679 (Paola side) and from km 0+514 (San Lucido side) and outlet at km 17+012 (Bivio Settimo side). The tunnel includes inside, at km 9+180, the Santomarco movement post exercised later in the DCO remote control for the crossing of trains.

The original project envisaged the insertion of the new track only from the north at the exit of Paola station and south to Castiglione Cosentino. Subsequently, during construction, the design variant was created with the connection to the south, on the Southern Tyrrhenian railway in the direction of the station of San Lucido and the connection with the Sibari-Cosenza railway to the north to reach the Jonica railway in Sibari and the important towns of Taranto and Bari.
