= Rosarno railway station =

Railway station in Italy

Rosarno
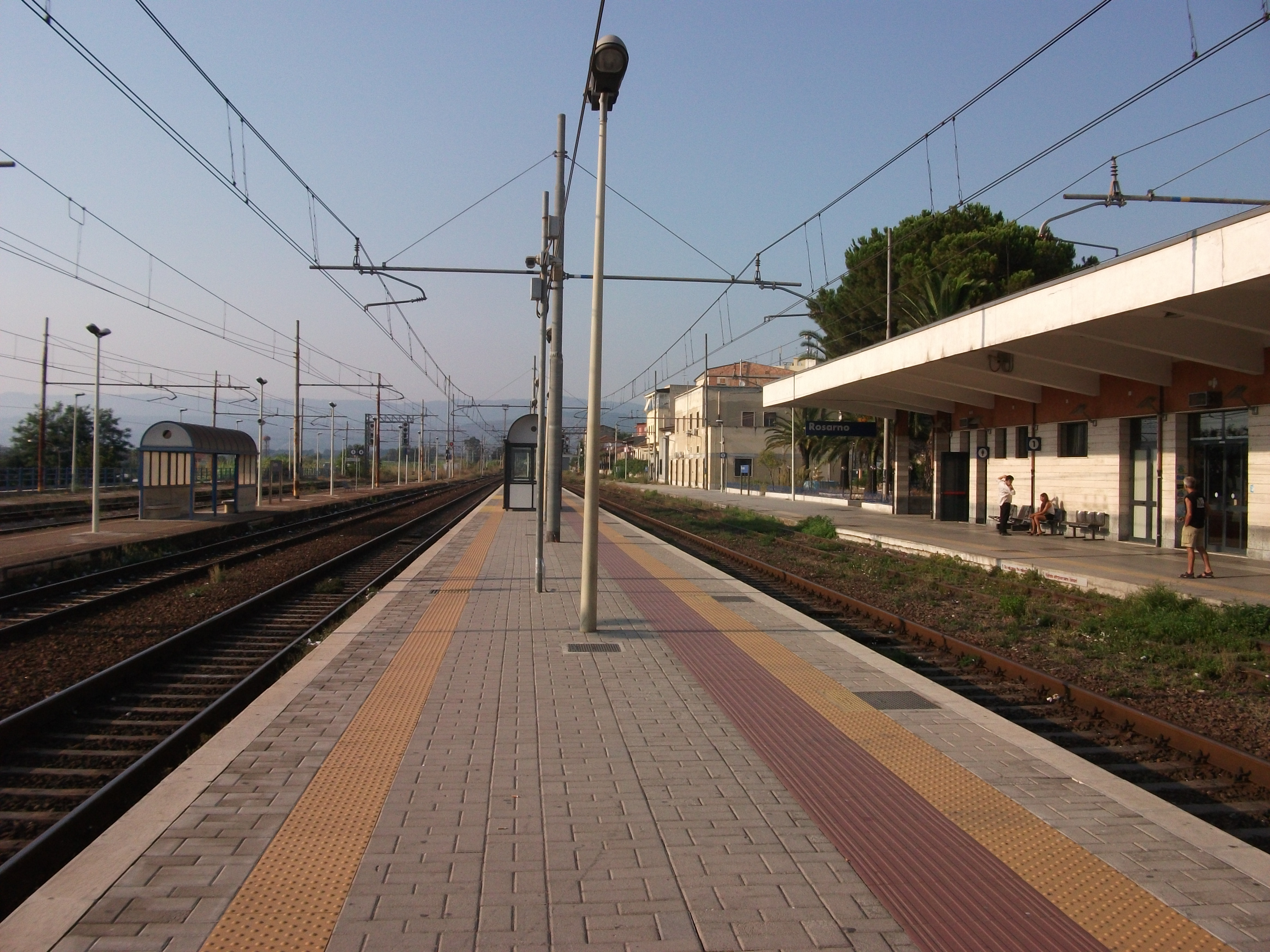
- Island platform for tracks 2 and 3

General information
- Location: Via Stazione, Rosarno; Italy
- Coordinates: 38°29′19.24″N 15°58′12.7″E
- Elevation: 18 MSL
- Owner: Rete Ferroviaria Italiana
- Line: Battipaglia–Reggio di Calabria
- Distance: 313 km from Battipaglia
- Platforms: 2 side platforms, 2 island platforms
- Tracks: 6
- Train operators: Trenitalia
- Connections: Buses, taxi

Construction
- Structure type: At-grade

Other information
- Classification: Silver

History
- Opened: December 21, 1891; 134 years ago
- Rebuilt: c. 1970s; 55 years ago
- Electrified: 1939; 87 years ago

Services
Preceding station	Trenitalia	Following station
Vibo Valentia–Pizzo towards Milano Centrale	InterCity Notte; Milan–Syracuse	Gioia Tauro towards Siracusa
Location
- Location within Calabria Location within Italy

Rosarno railway station (Italian: Stazione di Rosarno) is a railway station of the Italian city of Rosarno, Calabria, part of the Battipaglia–Reggio di Calabria railway.

== History ==
The station was built by Società per le Strade Ferrate del Mediterraneo as part of the extension of the today known Battipaglia–Reggio di Calabria railway from Gioia Tauro to Nicotera, opened on December 21, 1891.

The original, small, station was after entirely rebuilt during the 1970s in parallel with the construction of the variant direttissima between this station and the Lamezia Terme Centrale station.

== Layout ==
The station has six tracks, two side platforms and two island platforms, which are connected each other with an underpass. The island platform for tracks 2 and 3, because has an elevator, is the only accessible. The station building features the waiting room, a cafe, the ticket machine area and the toilet.

== Services ==
As of the December 2023 timetable change, the following services stop at Rosarno:

- Frecciarossa: services to Torino Porta Nuova, Venezia Santa Lucia, and Reggio di Calabria Centrale.
- Frecciargento / InterCity: services between Reggio di Calabria Centrale and Roma Termini.
- Intercity Notte: services to Milano Centrale, Siracusa, and Torino Porta Nuova.
- Regionale: services to Reggio di Calabria Centrale, Lamezia Terme Centrale, and Cosenza.
