= La Vota Lake =

Lake in Calabria, Italy

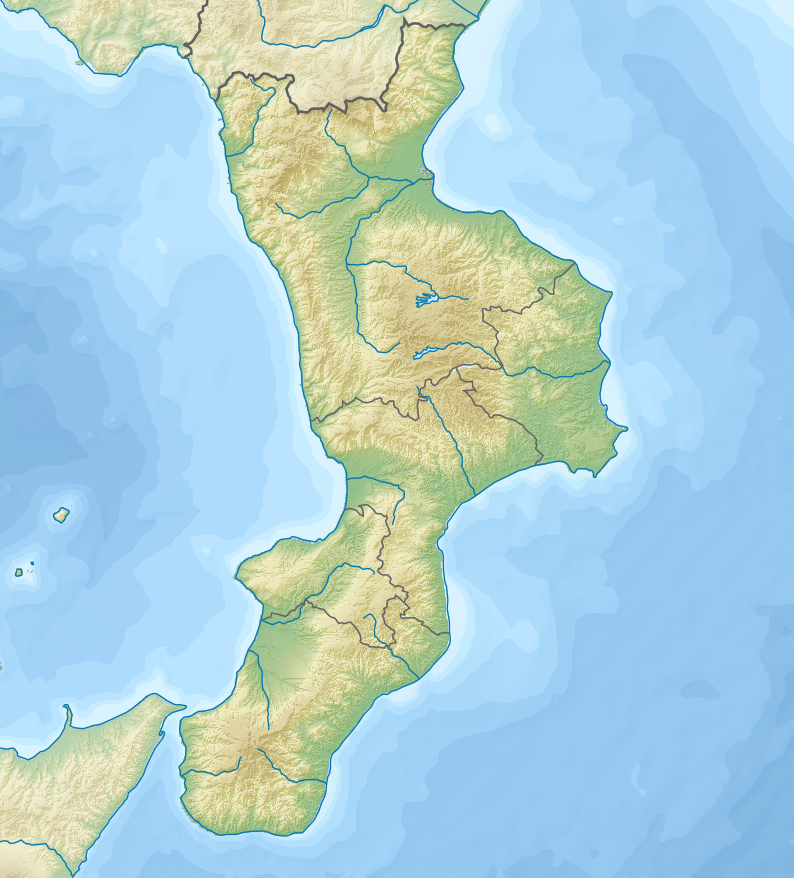
- Location within Calabria
- Location: Gizzeria, Province of Catanzaro, Calabria
- Coordinates: 38°56′31″N 16°11′18″E
- Basin countries: Italy

La Vota Lake is a lake in Gizzeria, Province of Catanzaro, Calabria, Italy.
