= Amantea railway station =

Railway station in Italy

Amantea
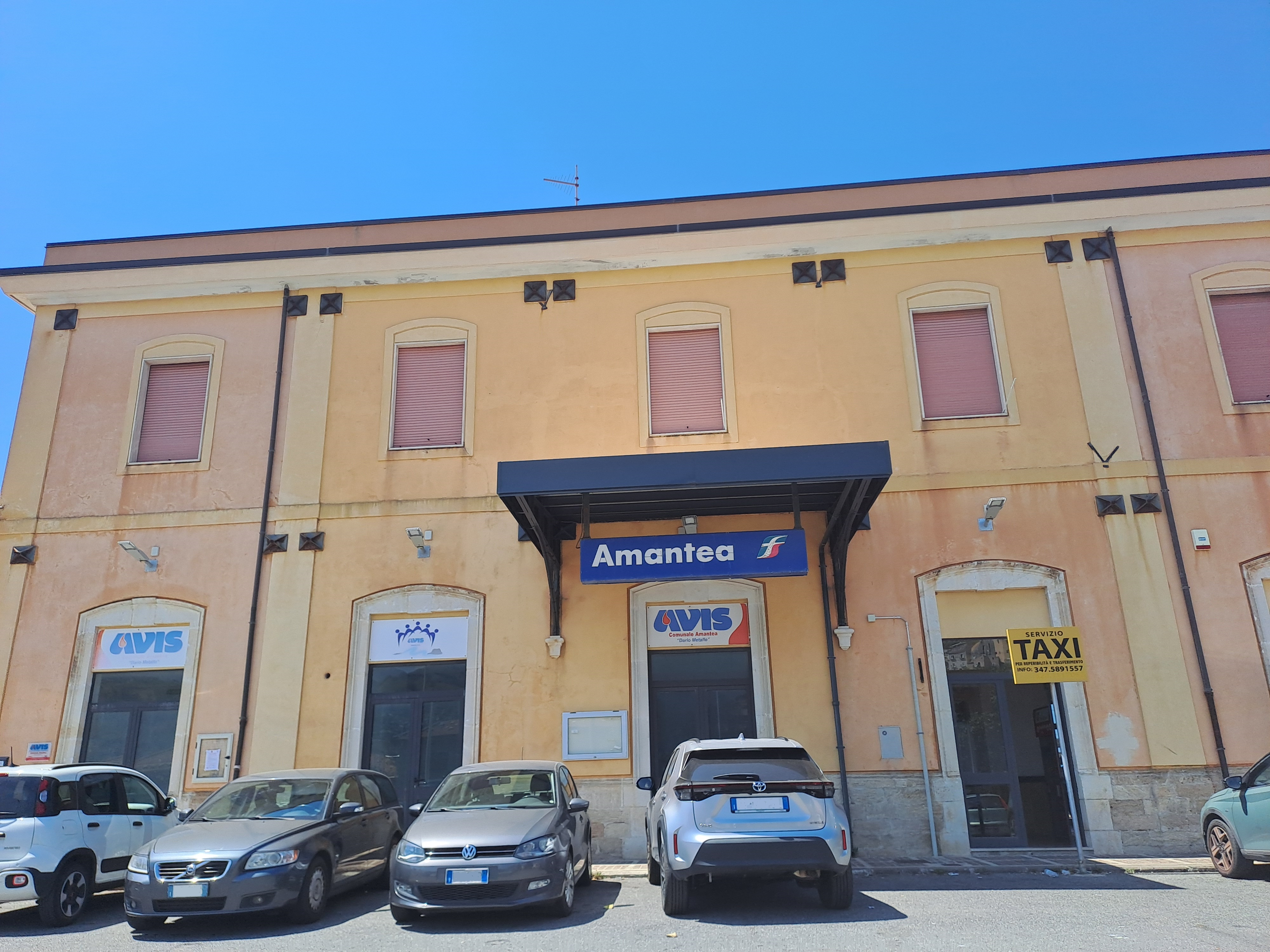

General information
- Location: Amantea, Province of Cosenza, Calabria; Italy
- Coordinates: 39°08′03.63″N 16°04′06.57″E
- Owner: Rete Ferroviaria Italiana
- Operator: Trenitalia
- Line: Salerno–Reggio Calabria railway

History
- Opened: July 31, 1895

Services
| Preceding station | Trenitalia | Following station |
|---|---|---|
| Paola towards Milano Centrale | InterCity Notte; Milan–Syracuse | Lamezia Terme Centrale towards Siracusa |
Location
- Location within Calabria Location within Italy

Amantea is a railway station owned by Rete Ferroviaria Italiana located in the municipality of Amantea. It is located on the Salerno–Reggio Calabria railway line.

== Services ==
The station is served by InterCity and InterCity Notte trains that connect the airport with the rest of the peninsula, with routes that have their terminus at stations such as Torino Porta Nuova, Reggio Calabria Centrale, Roma Termini and Milano Centrale, with a stopover also in Naples and in other cities of the peninsula crossed during the journey.

The station is served by Regional trains with a terminus in Reggio Calabria, continuing south on the Southern Tyrrenian Railway, and in Cosenza, reachable via a branch at Paola station.
