= Port of Salerno =

Coordinates: 40°39′52″N 14°44′41″E

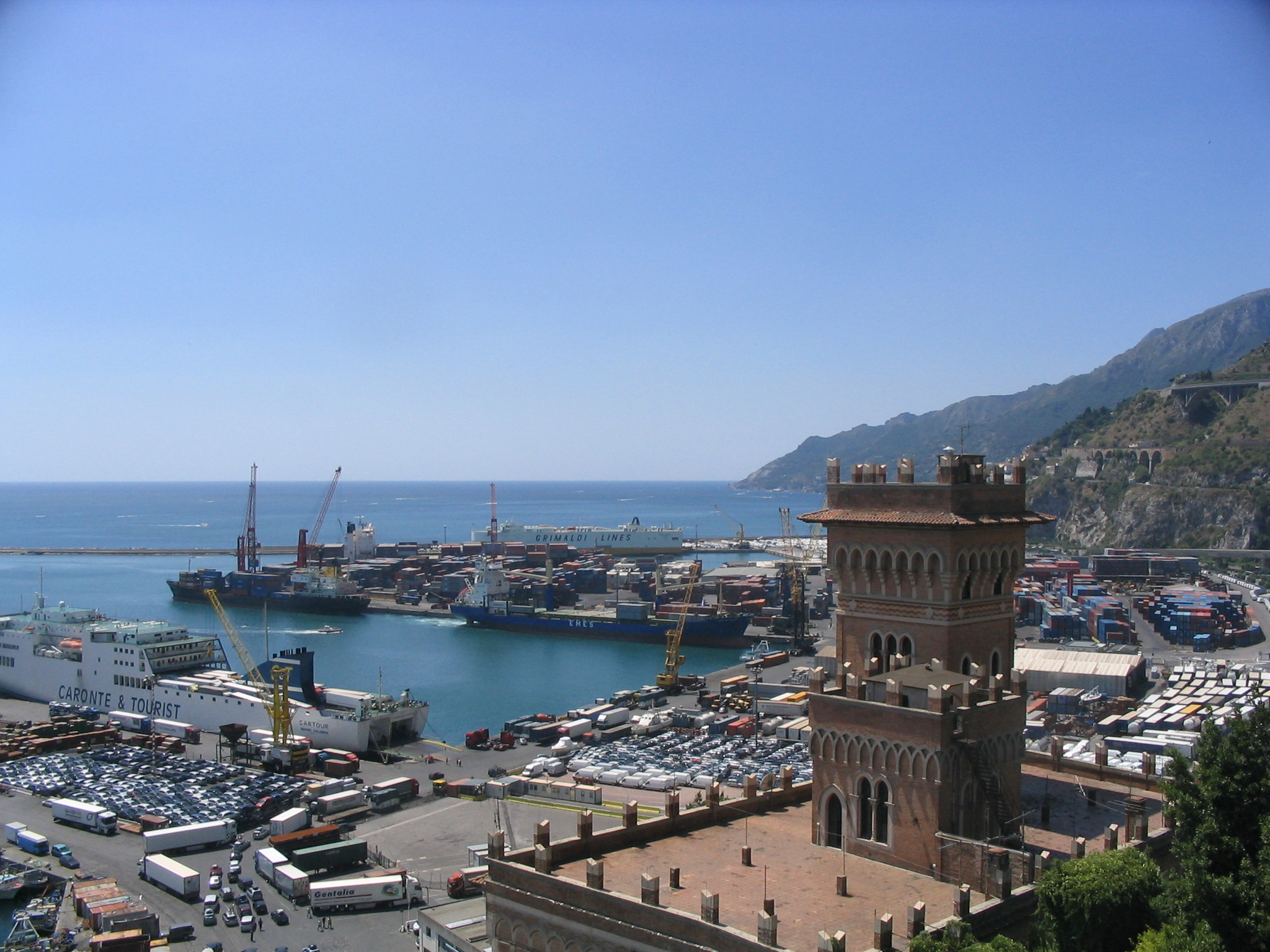
Port of Salerno

The Port of Salerno (Italian: Porto di Salerno) is a port serving Salerno, southwestern Italy. The port of Salerno, located in the gulf of the Tyrrhenian Sea, is registered in the class of II category of seaports. It is one of the major domestic ports and plays an important role in the industrial and commercial system of the center-south. In 2009, 18,426,447 tonnes and 562,782 passengers passed through the port. The port is 350 metres (1,150 ft) in length, and the West Quay is 1,180 metres (3,870 ft) long and the East Quay is 1,550 metres (5,090 ft) long. Manfredi Pier is 380 metres (1,250 ft) in length.
