= Melito di Porto Salvo railway station =

Railway station in Melito di Porto Salvo, Italy

Melito di Porto Salvo
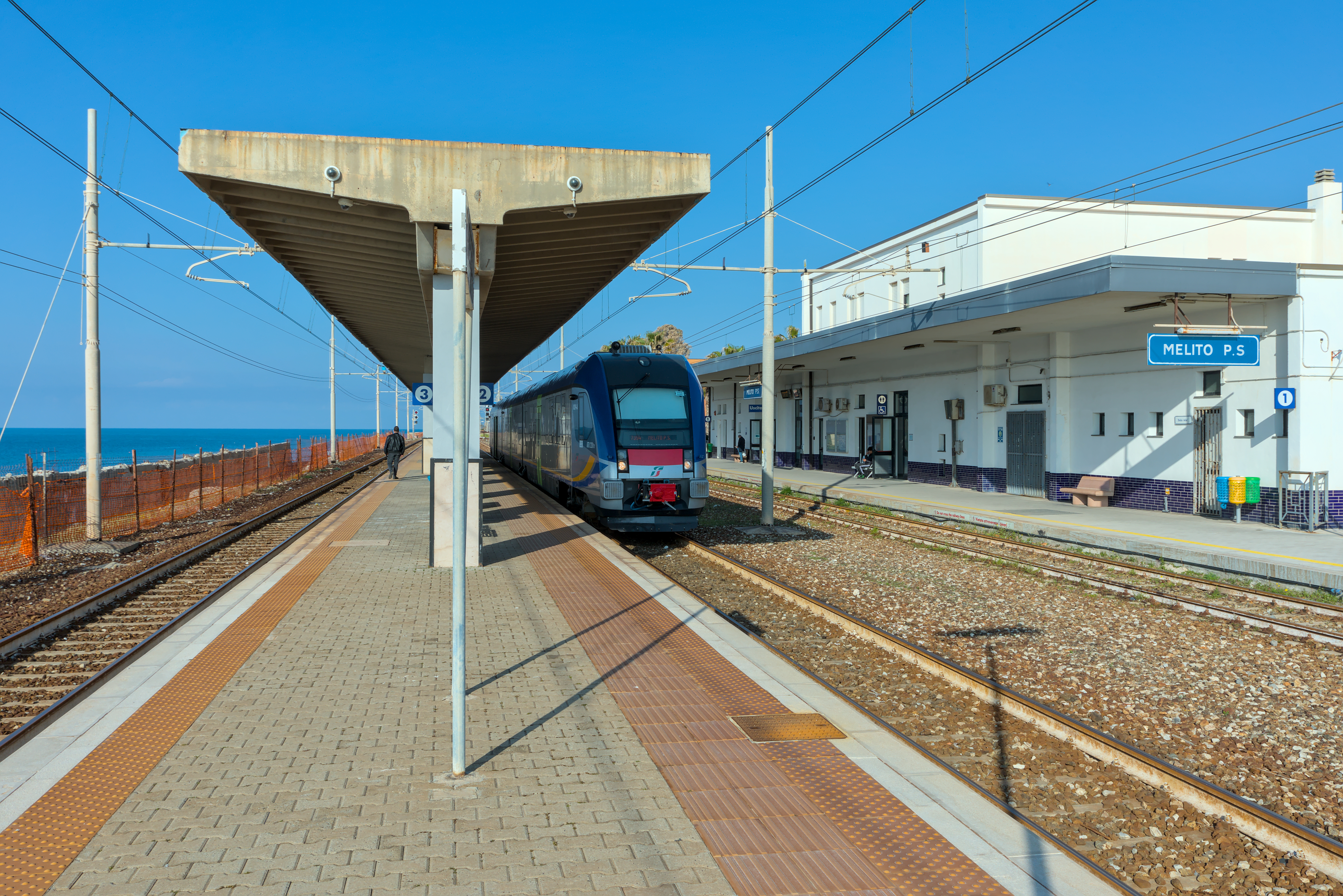

General information
- Location: Piazza Stazione, Melito di Porto Salvo; Italy
- Coordinates: 37°55′00.9″N 15°46′53.06″E
- Owner: Rete Ferroviaria Italiana
- Line: Jonica
- Platforms: 1 side platform, 1 island platform
- Tracks: 3
- Train operators: Trenitalia

Construction
- Structure type: At-grade

History
- Opened: 10 January 1868; 158 years ago
- Electrified: 18 April 2007; 19 years ago
Location
- Location within Calabria Location within Italy

Melito di Porto Salvo railway station (Italian: Stazione di Melito di Porto Salvo) is the main railway station of the Italian city of Melito di Porto Salvo, Calabria and it is part of the Jonica railway.

== History ==
The station was built by Società per le Strade Ferrate Calabro-Sicule as part of the extension of the Jonica railway from Lazzaro to Bianco, opened on 1 October 1868. In 1999, the station was equipped with a new station building and in April 2007 the station and the railway line south of it were electrified.

== Layout ==
The station has three tracks, one side platform and one island platform. Before 2007, the station had also another track and another side platform, later destroyed by a storm and not rebuilt. The station building features the waiting room, a cafe, the ticket machine area and the toilet.

== Services ==
The station is served by regional, suburban and InterCity trains operated by Trenitalia.
