= Reggio di Calabria Centrale railway station =

Railway station in Reggio Calabria, Italy

Reggio di Calabria Centrale
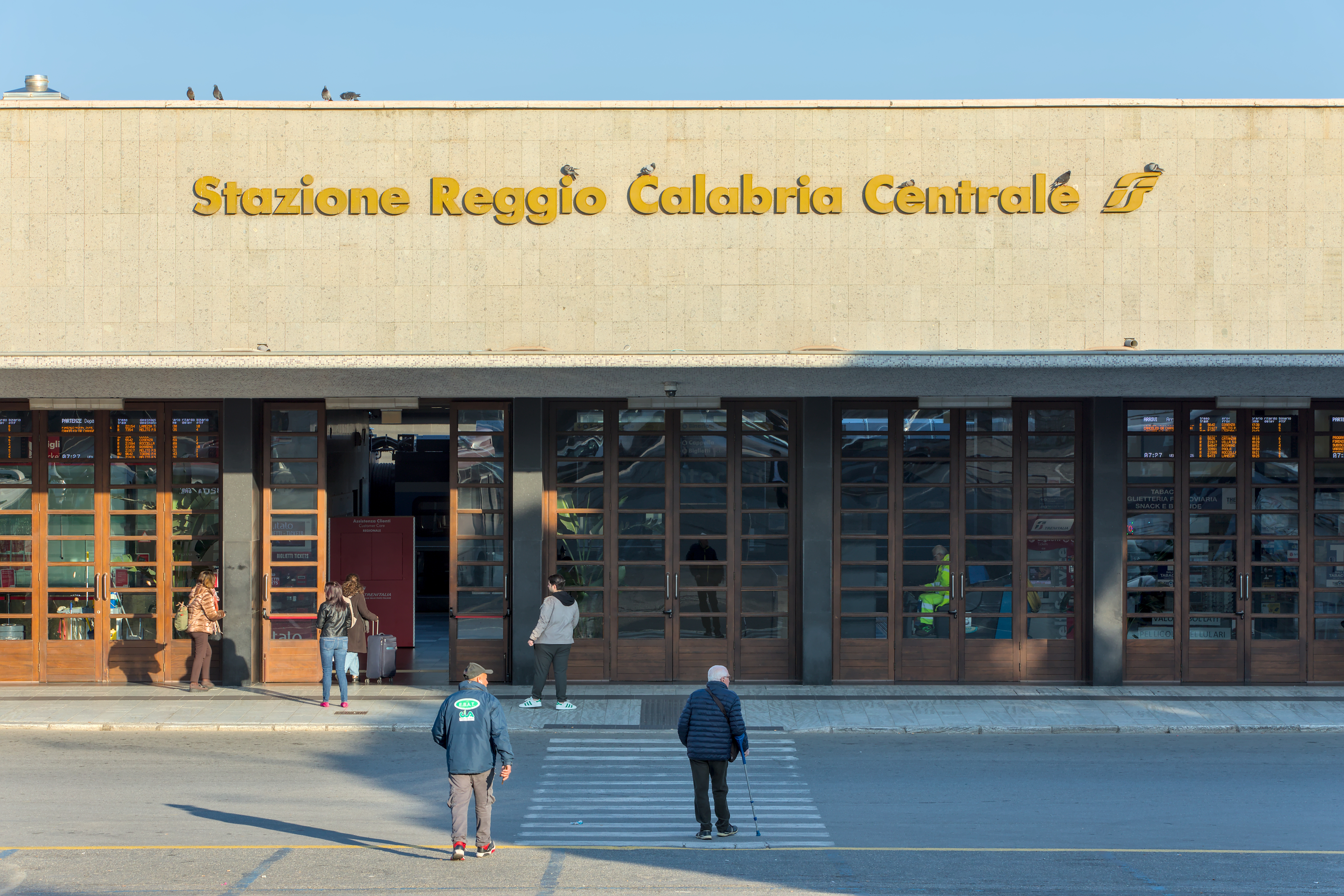
- Exterior of the station building

General information
- Location: Piazza Garibaldi; 89100 Reggio Calabria RC; Reggio Calabria, Reggio Calabria, Calabria
- Coordinates: 38°6′13.34″N 15°38′9.72″E
- Operator: Rete Ferroviaria Italiana; Centostazioni
- Lines: Battipaglia–Reggio Calabria; Taranto–Reggio Calabria
- Distance: 374.190 km (232.511 mi) from Battipaglia; 472.270 km (293.455 mi) from Taranto
- Platforms: 6 (10 tracks)
- Train operators: Trenitalia
- Connections: ATAM buses; Bluvia

Construction
- Architect: Angiolo Mazzoni

Other information
- IATA code: RCC
- Classification: Gold

History
- Opened: 1866; 160 years ago

Services
| Preceding station | Trenitalia | Following station |
|---|---|---|
| Villa San Giovanni towards Torino Porta Nuova | Frecciarossa | Terminus |
| Villa San Giovanni towards Roma Termini | Frecciargento | Terminus |
| Villa San Giovanni towards Roma Termini | InterCity | Terminus |
| Terminus | InterCity; Reggio Calabria–Bari/Lecce | Melito di Porto Salvo towards Bari Centrale or Lecce |
| Reggio di Calabria Lido towards Torino Porta Nuova | InterCity Notte | Terminus |
| Reggio di Calabria Lido towards Cosenza | Regionale | Terminus |
| Reggio di Calabria Lido towards Lamezia Terme Centrale | Regionale | Terminus |
| Terminus | Regionale | Reggio di Calabria OMECA towards Catanzaro Lido |
Location
- Location within Calabria Location within Italy

Reggio di Calabria Centrale railway station (Italian: Stazione di Reggio Calabria Centrale) (IATA: RCC) is the main railway station of the Italian city of Reggio Calabria in Calabria. It is the most important station of its region and is owned by the Ferrovie dello Stato, the national rail company of Italy.

== History ==
The station was opened on 3 June 1866, as southern terminal of the first track of the Ionian Railway to Catanzaro, Crotone, Sybaris and Taranto. In 1881 it was linked to the port with a link from Reggio Lido to Reggio Marittima, the port station. The northern track to Villa San Giovanni, linking the station to the Battipaglia–Reggio di Calabria railway, was completed in 1884.

On 15 July 1970 the station was occupied by demonstrators in the first days of Reggio revolt.

== Services ==
As of the December 2023 timetable change, the following services stop at Reggio di Calabria Centrale:

- Frecciarossa: services to Torino Porta Nuova and Venezia Santa Lucia.
- Frecciargento / InterCity: services to Roma Termini and Taranto.
- Intercity Notte: service to Torino Porta Nuova.
- Regionale: services to Lamezia Terme Centrale, Cosenza, and Catanzaro Lido.

== Structure and transport ==
The new station building, projected following the modern criteria of the futurist architect Angiolo Mazzoni, was inaugurated on 18 April 1938. It counts a single floor and is located in front of the sea coast.

The station, electrified, is served by several regional trains and by a suburban rail connecting all the 10 stations of the city, from Villa San Giovanni to Melito di Porto Salvo. For long-distance transport it counts some InterCity, Express and EuroStar trains to Rome, Turin, Milan, Venice, Bari and Bolzano, linking it also with Genoa, Naples, Bologna, Florence, Pisa, Verona and other cities. Periodically it counts on direct connections to Udine and Trieste. Reggio Centrale has not international relations and direct trains to Sicily (connected with the near station of Villa San Giovanni); and all the high-speed trains (EuroStar) provide to link it with Rome on the line via Lamezia, Salerno and Naples.

== Gallery ==
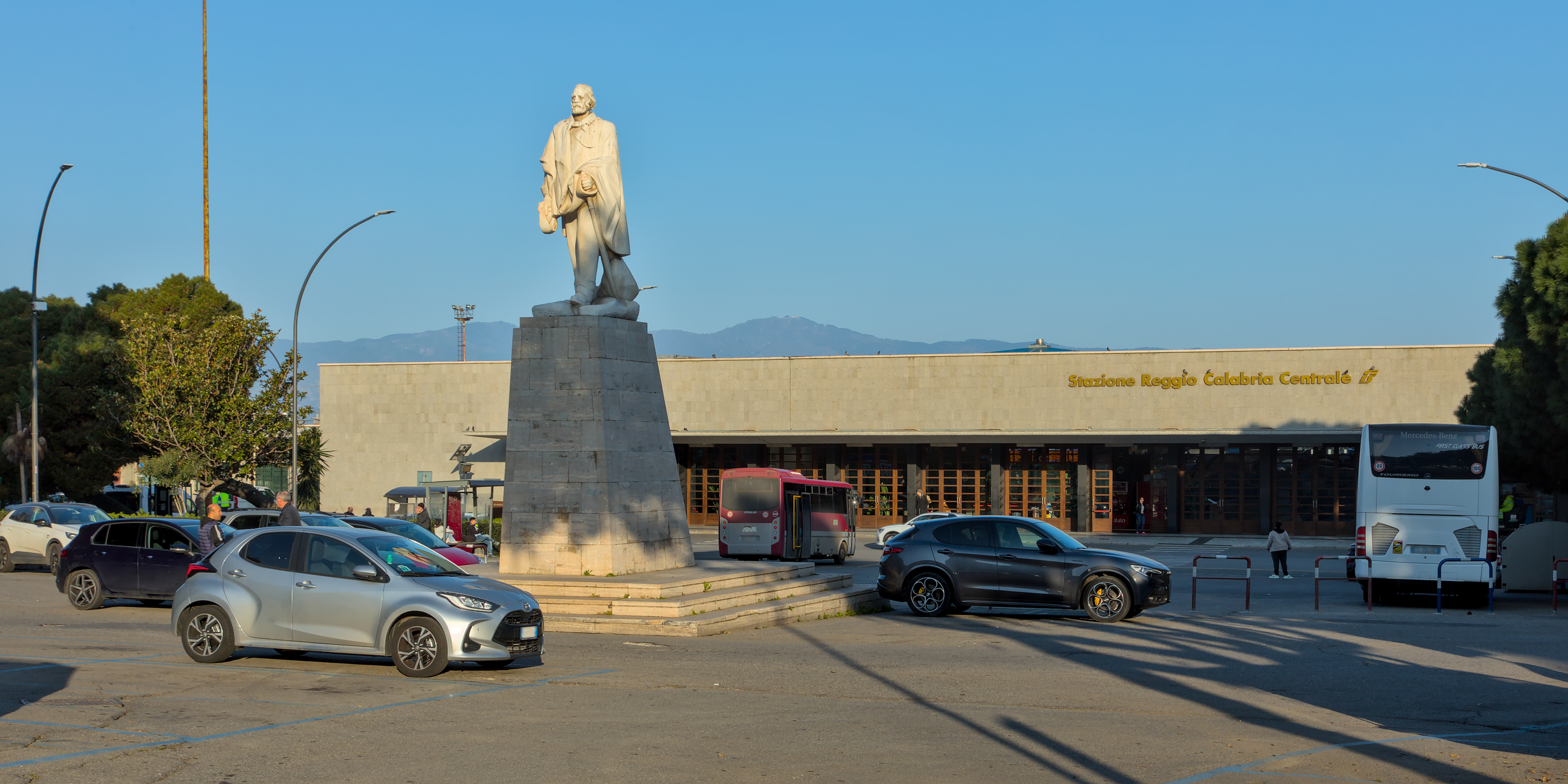
Railway station and Garibaldi monument in 2026

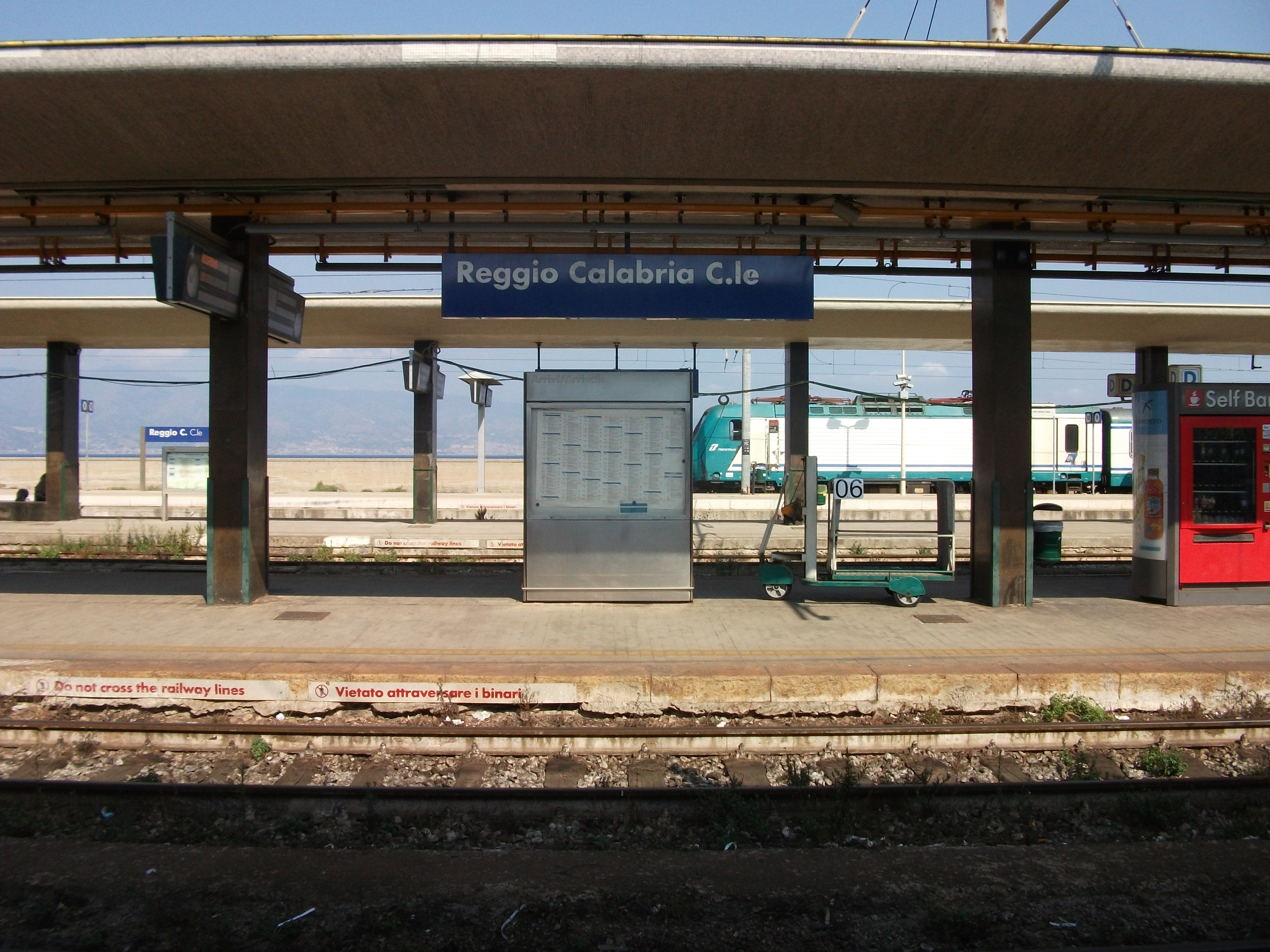
View of the platforms

Map of the suburban railway service

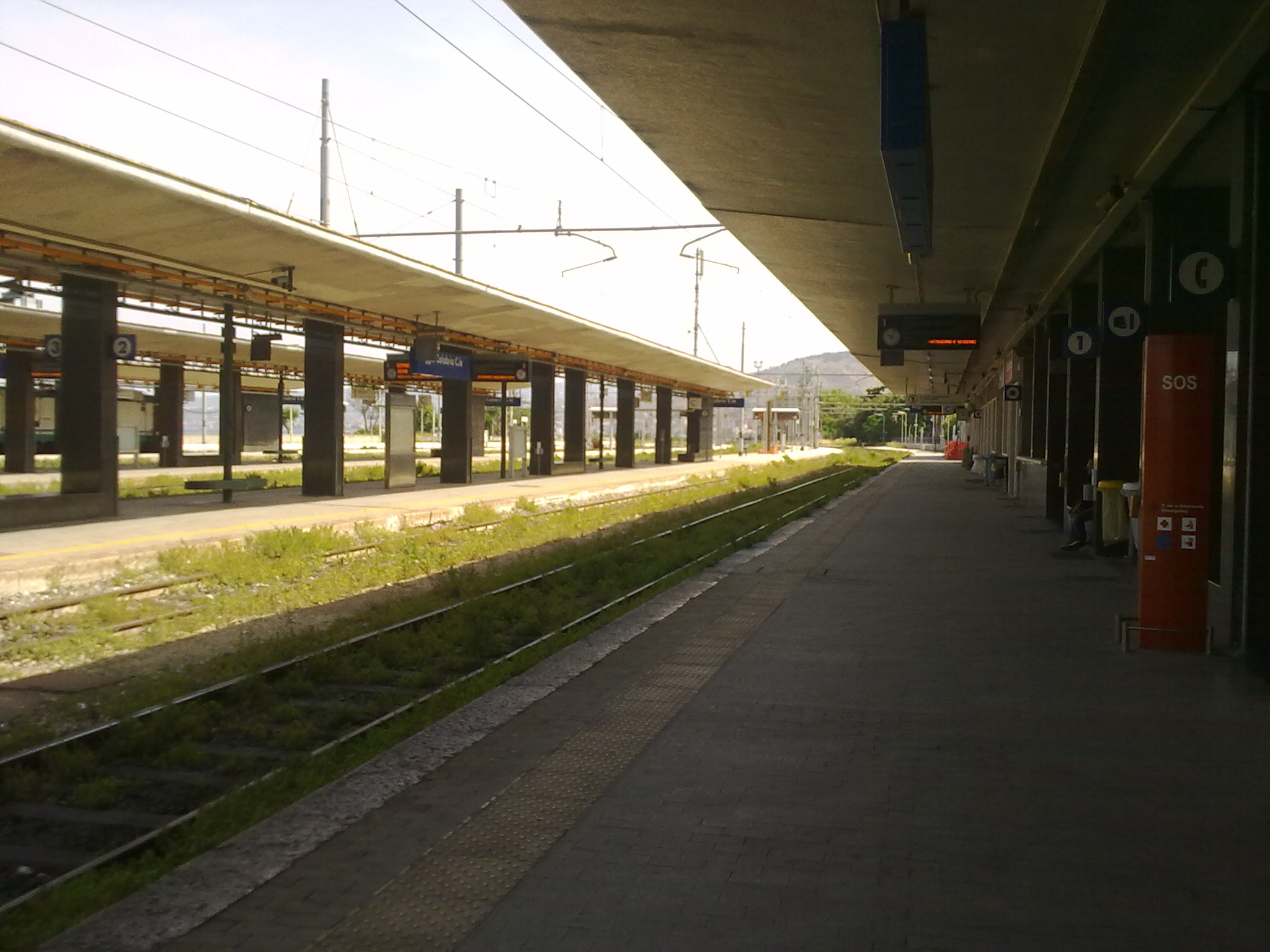
View of tracks 1 and 2

== See also ==
- List of railway stations in Calabria
- Rail transport in Italy
- History of rail transport in Italy
