= Crotone railway station =

Railway station in Crotone, Italy

Crotone
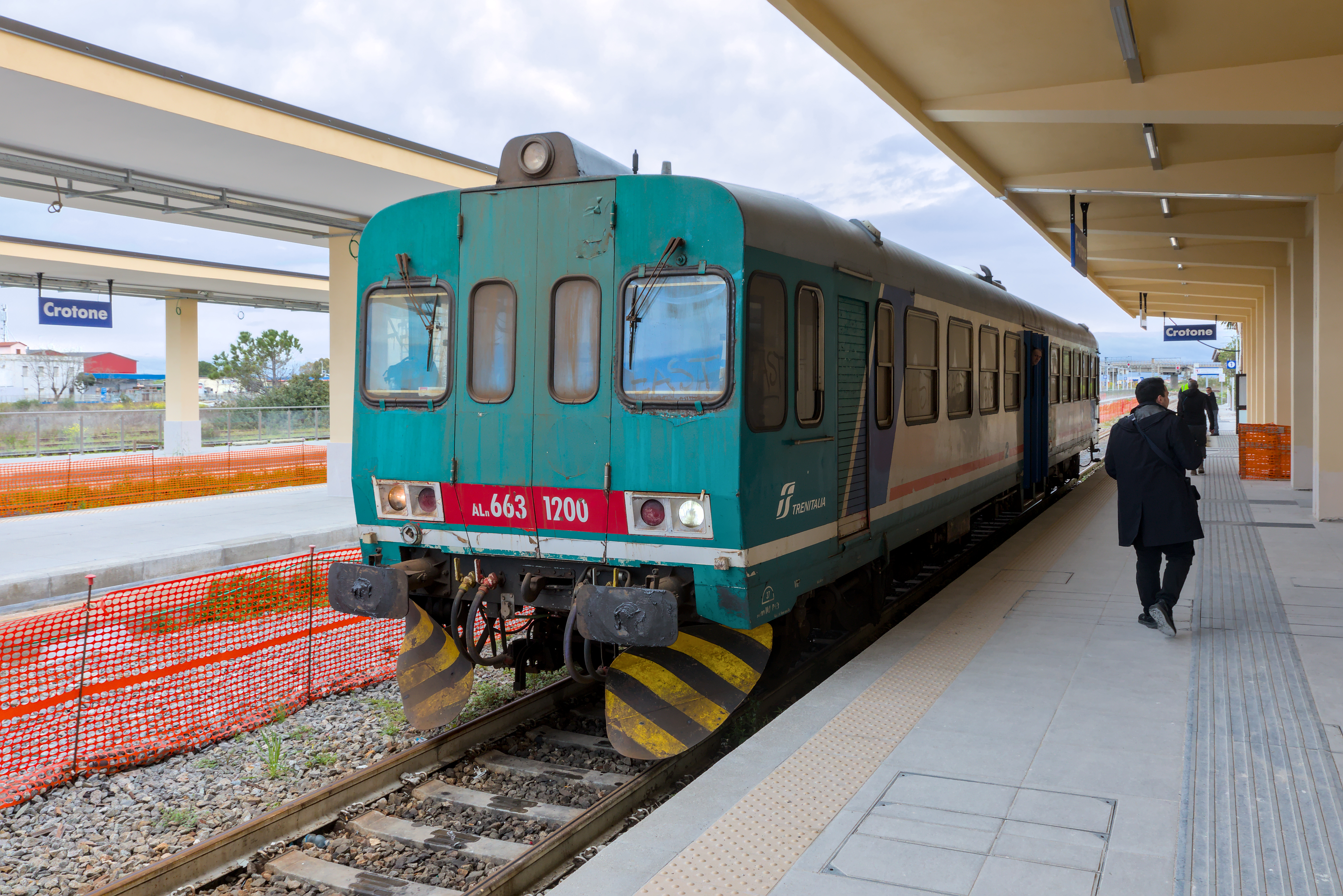
- Crotone railway station

General information
- Location: Crotone, Province of Crotone, Calabria; Italy
- Coordinates: 39°05′03″N 17°06′32″E
- Owner: Rete Ferroviaria Italiana
- Operator: Trenitalia
- Line: Jonica railway

History
- Opened: 1875; 151 years ago
Location
- Location within Calabria Location within Italy

Crotone is a railway station in Crotone, Italy. The station is located on the Jonica railway . The train services are operated by Trenitalia.

== Train services ==
The station is served by the following service(s):

- Intercity services Taranto - Sibari - Crotone - Catanzaro Lido - Roccella Jonica - Reggio Calabria
- Regional services (Treno regionale) Sibari - Crotone - Cantanzaro Lido
