= Lamezia Terme Centrale railway station =

Railway station in Italy

Lamezia Terme Centrale
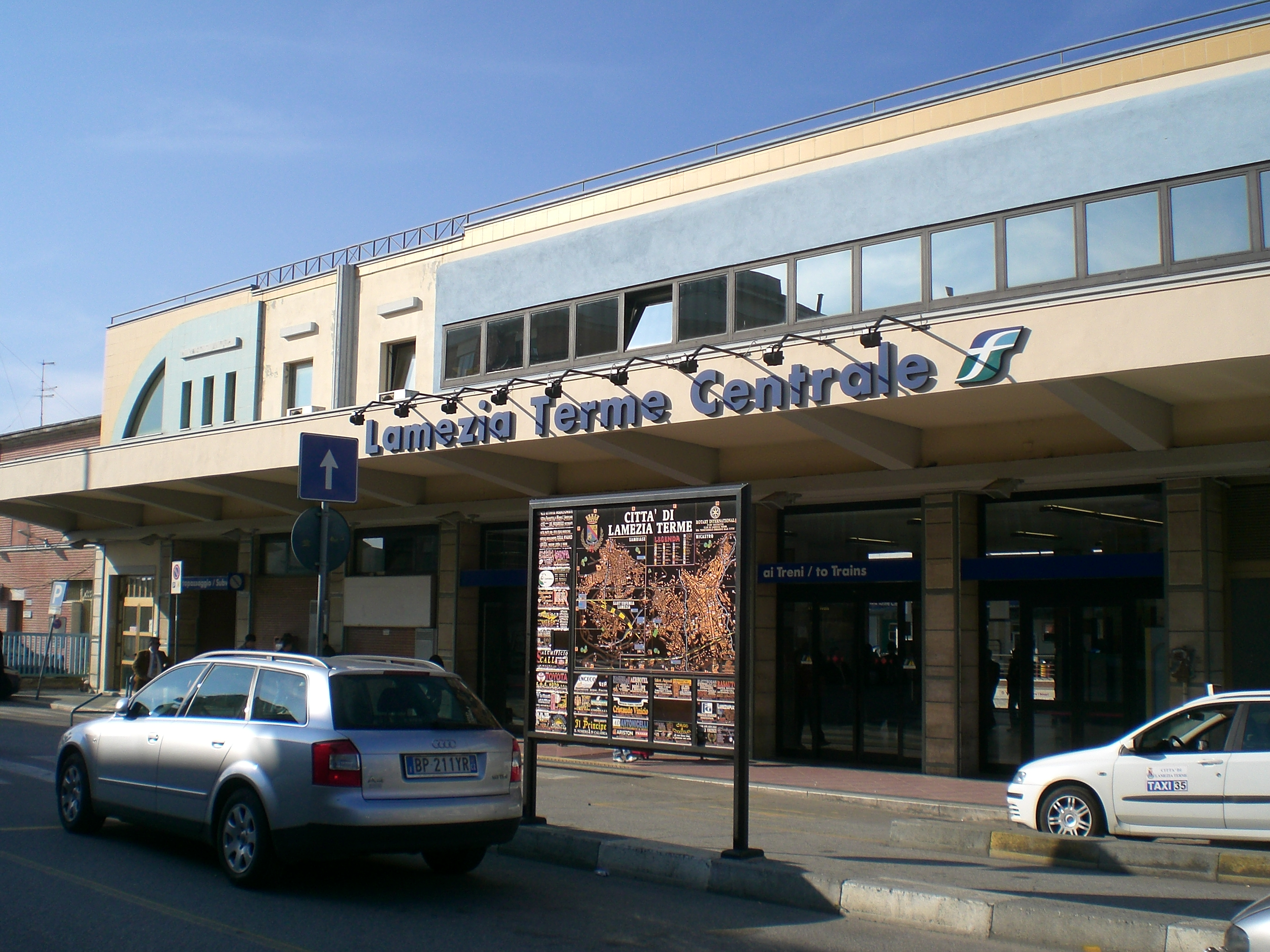

General information
- Location: Via del Mare; Lamezia Terme, Catanzaro, Calabria; Italy
- Coordinates: 38°55′16″N 16°15′20″E
- Operator: Rete Ferroviaria Italiana
- Lines: Battipaglia–Reggio di Calabria; Lamezia Terme–Catanzaro Lido
- Distance: 253.871 km (157.748 mi) from Battipaglia
- Platforms: 7
- Train operators: Trenitalia
- Connections: Urban buses

Other information
- IATA code: LTZ
- Classification: Gold

History
- Opened: 15 November 1894; 131 years ago
- Former names: Sant'Eufemia Biforcazione

Services
Preceding station	Trenitalia	Following station
Amantea towards Milano Centrale	InterCity Notte; Milan–Syracuse	Vibo Valentia–Pizzo towards Siracusa
Location
- Location within Calabria Location within Italy

Lamezia Terme Centrale railway station (Italian: Stazione di Lamezia Terme Centrale) (IATA: LTZ) is the main railway station serving the city and comune of Lamezia Terme, in the Calabria region, Southern Italy. Opened in 1894, it forms part of the Battipaglia–Reggio di Calabria railway, and is also a terminus of a secondary line, the Lamezia Terme–Catanzaro Lido railway.

The station is currently managed by Rete Ferroviaria Italiana (RFI). Train services are operated by or on behalf of Trenitalia. Each of these companies is a subsidiary of Ferrovie dello Stato (FS), Italy's state-owned rail company.

== Location ==
Lamezia Terme Centrale railway station is situated at via del Mare, at the northeastern edge of the city centre.

== History ==
The station was opened on 15 November 1894, under its original name Sant'Eufemia Biforcazione, together with the rest of the section of the Battipaglia–Reggio di Calabria railway between Pizzo and Gizzeria Lido (the latter then known as Sant'Eufemia Marina). On the same day, the first part of the line to Catanzaro Lido, extending about 25 km (16 mi) to Marcellinara, was also opened to traffic.

Management of the station and line was initially entrusted to the Società per le Strade Ferrate del Mediterraneo (English: Company for the Railways of the Mediterranean).

The following year, on 31 July 1895, the final section of the Southern Tyrrhenian railway was completed, between Praja-Ajeta-Tortora and Gizzeria Lido (Sant'Eufemia Marina), via Scalea, Cetraro, Paola and Amantea. This new section of line also connected Lamezia Terme with the rest of the Tyrrhenian coast. On 31 July 1899, Catanzaro became accessible by rail from the Tyrrhenian, thus connecting Sant'Eufemia Biforcazione with the Jonica railway.

Between 1928 and 1935, a program of reclamation of the plain of Sant'Eufemia was initiated. It involved the construction of several houses, and a new and larger station in the locality of Marina di Gizzeria (then still known as Sant'Eufemia Marina). When the new station opened in 1935, it took the new name Sant'Eufemia Lamezia (instead of the previous Sant'Eufemia Biforcazione). In the same year, the entire Southern Tyrrhenian railway was electrified, and a locomotive depot was built on the north side of the station.

In the 1960s, the station was extended, following the construction of double track between Scalea and San Pietro a Maida and modernization of all facilities.

Finally, in 1969, after the establishment of the new town of Lamezia Terme (which brought together the comuni of Nicastro, Sambiase and Sant'Eufemia Lamezia), the station's name was changed again, this time to its current one. The suffix Centrale was added to distinguish the station from the town's other two stations, Lamezia Terme Nicastro and Lamezia Terme Sambiase, respectively.

== Features ==
The station has seven tracks for passenger service. Each is equipped with a platform fitted with a shelter. The platforms are connected with each other by pedestrian underpasses.

The goods yard extends from the station's eastern side.

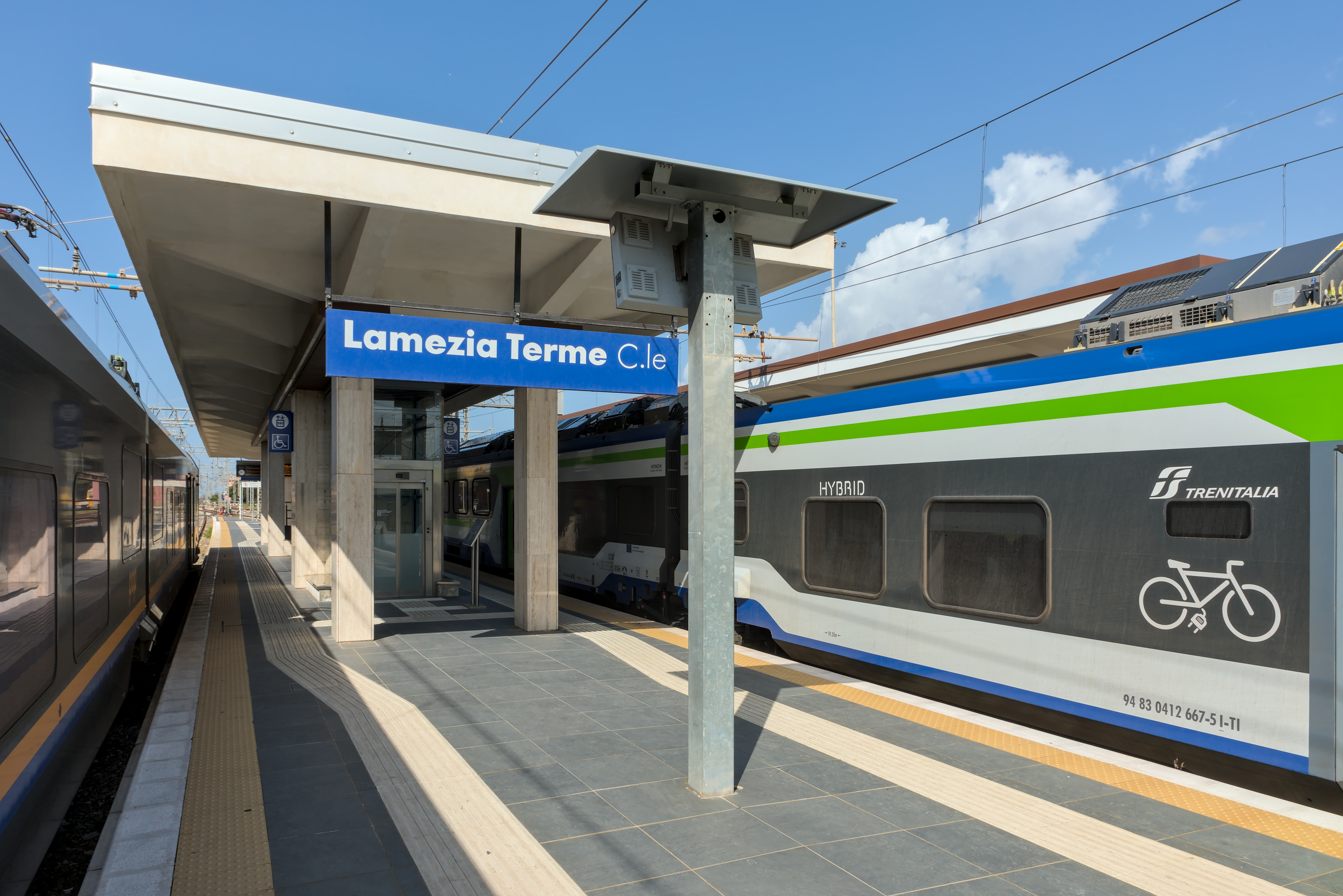
A platform.

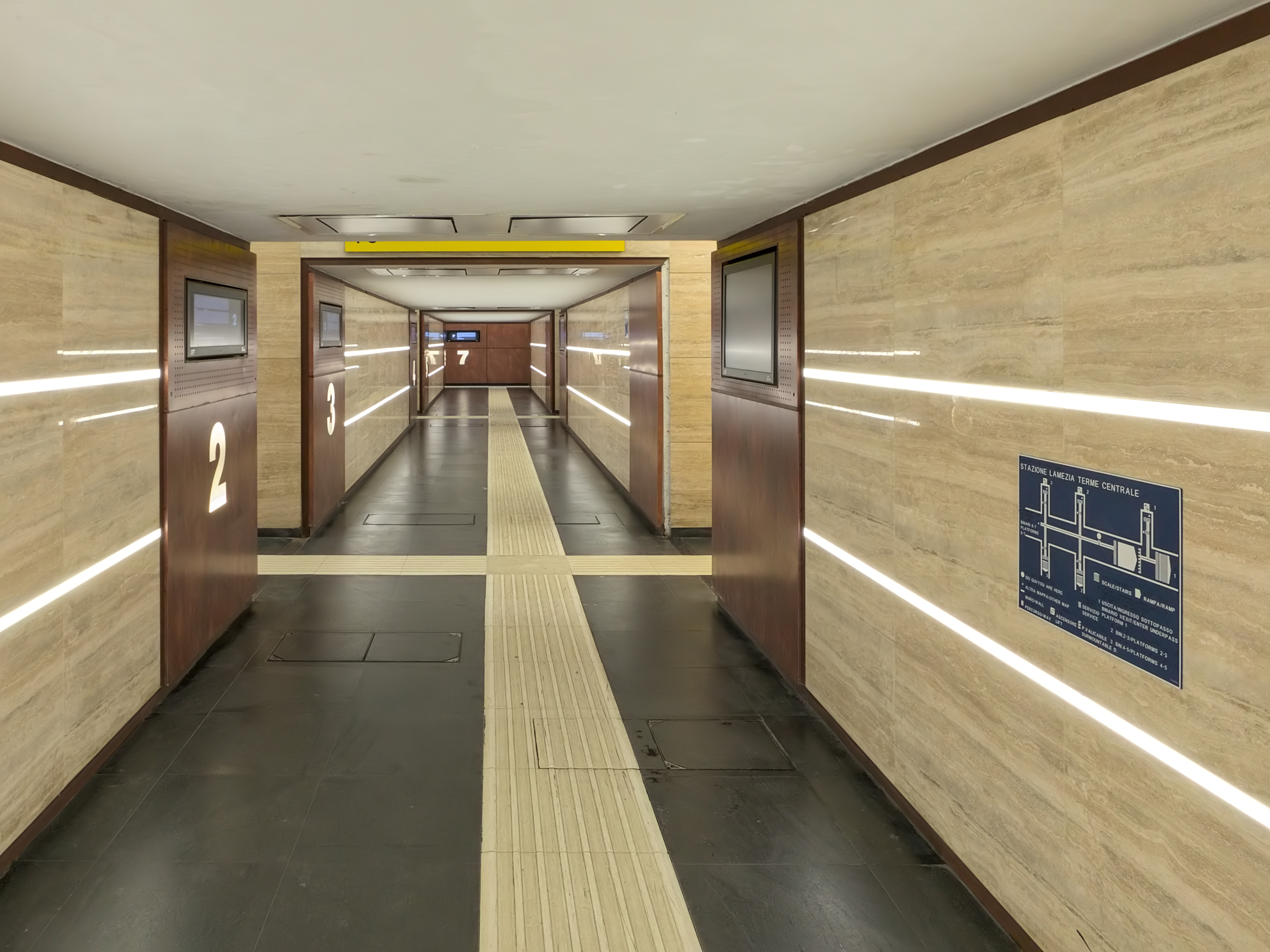
The underpass.

== Passenger and train movements ==
The station has always played a significant role in passenger traffic for the Catanzaro branch (Lamezia Terme-Catanzaro Lido railway). It has always been a stop for all categories of trains originating and terminating in Catanzaro.

Lamezia Terme was the origin and destination of some ES Fast category trains, connecting the city with Roma Termini. These trains were operated by Frecciargento high-speed multiple units, but have been withdrawn.

== Interchange ==
The station has a bus terminus for urban buses.

== See also ==
- History of rail transport in Italy
- List of railway stations in Calabria
- Rail transport in Italy
- Railway stations in Italy
