= Gizzeria =

- Comune
- Comune di Gizzeria
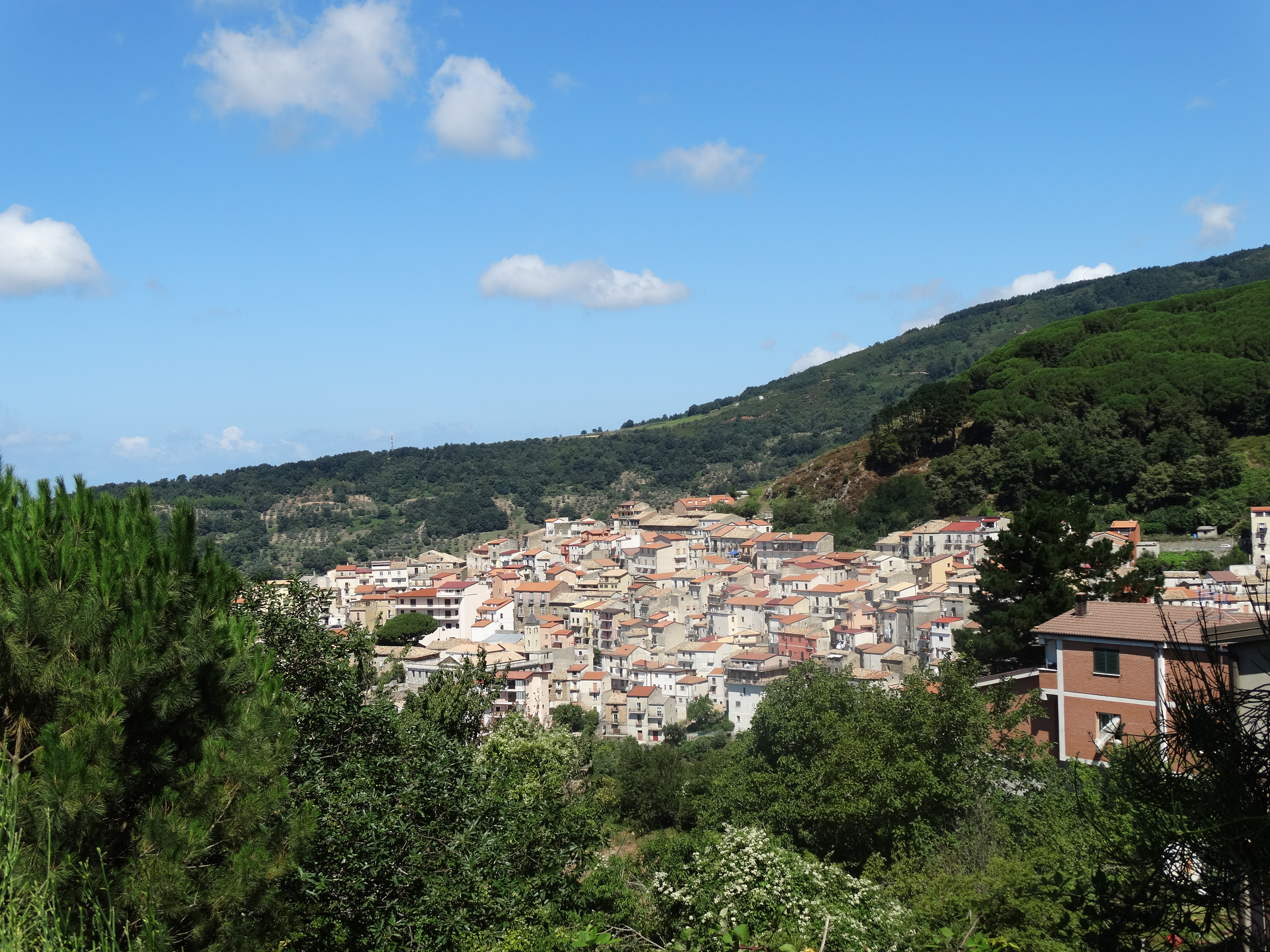
- Gizzeria

- Gizzeria within the Province of Catanzaro

- Location within Italy Location within Calabria
- Coordinates: 38°58′50″N 16°12′20″E
- Country: Italy
- Region: Calabria
- Province: Catanzaro (CZ)
- Frazioni: Gizzeria Lido, Mortilla, La Destra, Scaramella, La Prisa

Area
  - Total: 35.9 km^{2} (13.9 sq mi)
- Elevation: 630 m (2,070 ft)

Population (31 December 2013)
  - Total: 4,709
  - Density: 131/km^{2} (340/sq mi)
- Demonym: Gizzeroti
- Time zone: UTC+1 (CET)
  - Summer (DST): UTC+2 (CEST)
- Postal code: 88040
- Dialing code: 0968
- Patron saint: John the Baptist
- Saint day: 24 June
- Website: Official website

Gizzeria (Calabrian: Iezzarìa; Arbëreshë Albanian: Jacarise) is an Arbëreshë comune and town in the province of Catanzaro in the Calabria region of Italy.

A notable community of Italian settlers from Gizzeria, along with their descendants, resides in Wollongong and Sydney’s Northern Beaches, particularly in the suburb of Narraweena.

== Overview ==
The center of town is 625 metres (2,051 ft) above sea level. Monte Mancuso is the town's highest point at 1,290 metres (4,230 ft) above sea level. Gizzeria shares borders in common with the municipalities of Falerna, Nocera Terinese, Lamezia Terme and the Tyrrhenian Sea.

The town's territory is within 5 minutes driving distance from the Lamezia Terme International Airport, as well as 10 minutes driving distance from the Lamezia Terme Centrale train station.

Gizzeria is located approximately 60 kilometres (37 mi) from Catanzaro, its provincial capital.

== See also ==
- Lago La Vota
