= Salerno–Reggio di Calabria railway =

Key southern Italian transport link

Salerno–Reggio Calabria railway
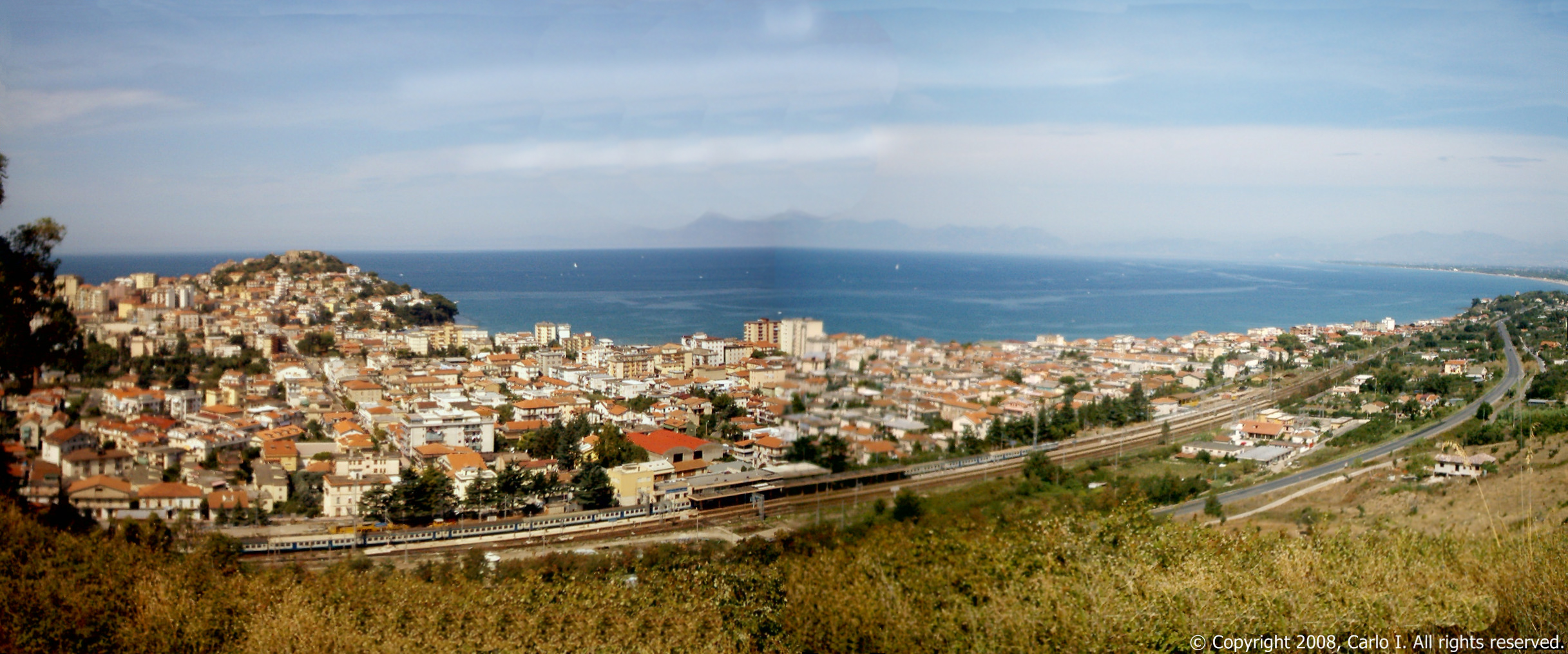
- Salerno–Reggio Calabria railway in Agropoli

Overview
- Native name: Ferrovia Tirrenica Meridionale
- Status: Operational
- Owner: RFI
- Line number: 142
- Locale: Italy
- Termini: Salerno; Reggio Calabria Centrale

Service
- Type: Heavy rail
- Operator: Trenitalia

History
- Opened: 1883 to 1895

Technical
- Line length: 393 km (244 mi)
- Number of tracks: 2
- Track gauge: 1,435 mm (4 ft 8 1/2 in)
- Electrification: 3000 V DC

The Salerno–Reggio Calabria railway (known in Italian as the ferrovia Tirrenica Meridionale, literally "the Southern Tyrrhenian railway") is the most important north–south railway connection between Sicily, Calabria and the rest of the Italian peninsula. It forms the southern section of Corridor 1 of the European Union's Trans-European high-speed rail network, which connects Berlin and Palermo. Its southern part, between Rosarno and San Lucido is also used as an RFI freight route between the Port of Gioia Tauro and the Adriatic railway.

The line is characterised by a track mostly close to the coast and is used by all categories of trains coming from Naples, Rome and other northern cities headed for Calabria, Sicily and on the initial section to Battipaglia, to Potenza. It also handles similar traffic in the opposite direction.

== History ==
The Battipaglia-Reggio Calabria railway, which, due to the difficult terrain of the regions crossed, required long viaducts and tunnels, like the lines in Liguria, was built between 1883 and 1895 as a single-track line, operated with steam traction, after the east coast north–south railway via Metaponto and the Ionian Railway (ferrovia Jonica, Reggio–Catanzaro–Crotone–Taranto). The Victor Emmanuel Railway Company (Società Vittorio Emanuele), which had obtained a concession for the construction and operation of the Calabrian and Sicilian railways in 1866 under 1865 legislation for the reorganisation of the railways, had completed the construction of the Ionian Railway from Reggio Calabria and Taranto in 1875, when the two section were connected in Crotone. This allowed travel by rail from Naples to Reggio Calabria, but over a very long route. From Battipaglia it was necessary to go to Metaponto via Potenza and then reverse direction and travel along the coast over the whole of the Ionian line in Basilicata and Calabria. The length of this route was extended not only by the deviation to the east but because the line almost slavishly followed the Ionian coast of Calabria, which is longer than the Tyrrhenian coast. For this reason, many parties requested the construction of line on the shorter Tyrrhenian route. Already, in 1861, the Minister Peruzzi had stated that the connection would be very useful for Calabria and Sicily and, in 1870, the Chamber of Deputies of the Kingdom of Italy authorised the government to proceed with its construction.

Route studies were carried out by engineer Giordano, who proposed a route from Eboli through Cilento and the Vallo della Lucania to Sapri and Maratea, and engineer Gargiulo, who preferred a shorter inland route through the Vallo di Diano and the valley of the Noce ending at Castrocucco (south of Maratea). The choice was not easy and there were heated clashes in Parliament between the deputies representing Basilicata and Campania until the passing of the Baccarini Law in 1879. Given the recognised importance of the line, both routes were included in table "A" of the legislation, which were to be built at the full cost of the state.

The use of the railway for the transport of citrus fruit began to increase in those years, due to the introduction of concessionary rate for its transport to stimulate its production. New agreements had also been entered into with France, Austria-Hungary and Switzerland, and the citrus trade began to move from the Americas to the centre of Europe, thus shifting from sea to rail transport.

Section	Opening
Battipaglia–Agropoli	4 June 1883
Reggio di Calabria–Villa San Giovanni	19 May 1884
Villa San Giovanni–Scilla	28 December 1885
Scilla–Bagnara	26 April 1886
Agropoli–Vallo della Lucania	4 May 1887
Bagnara–Palmi	31 December 1888
Palmi–Gioia Tauro (provisional)	3 February 1889
Vallo della Lucania–Pisciotta	30 June 1889
Gioia Tauro (provisional)–Gioia Tauro	27 November 1890
Gioia Tauro–Nicotera	21 December 1891
Nicotera–Ricadi	1 January 1893
Ricadi–Pizzo	6 June 1894
Pisciotta–Praja	30 July 1894
Pizzo–Gizzeria Lido	15 November 1894
Praja–Gizzeria Lido	31 July 1895

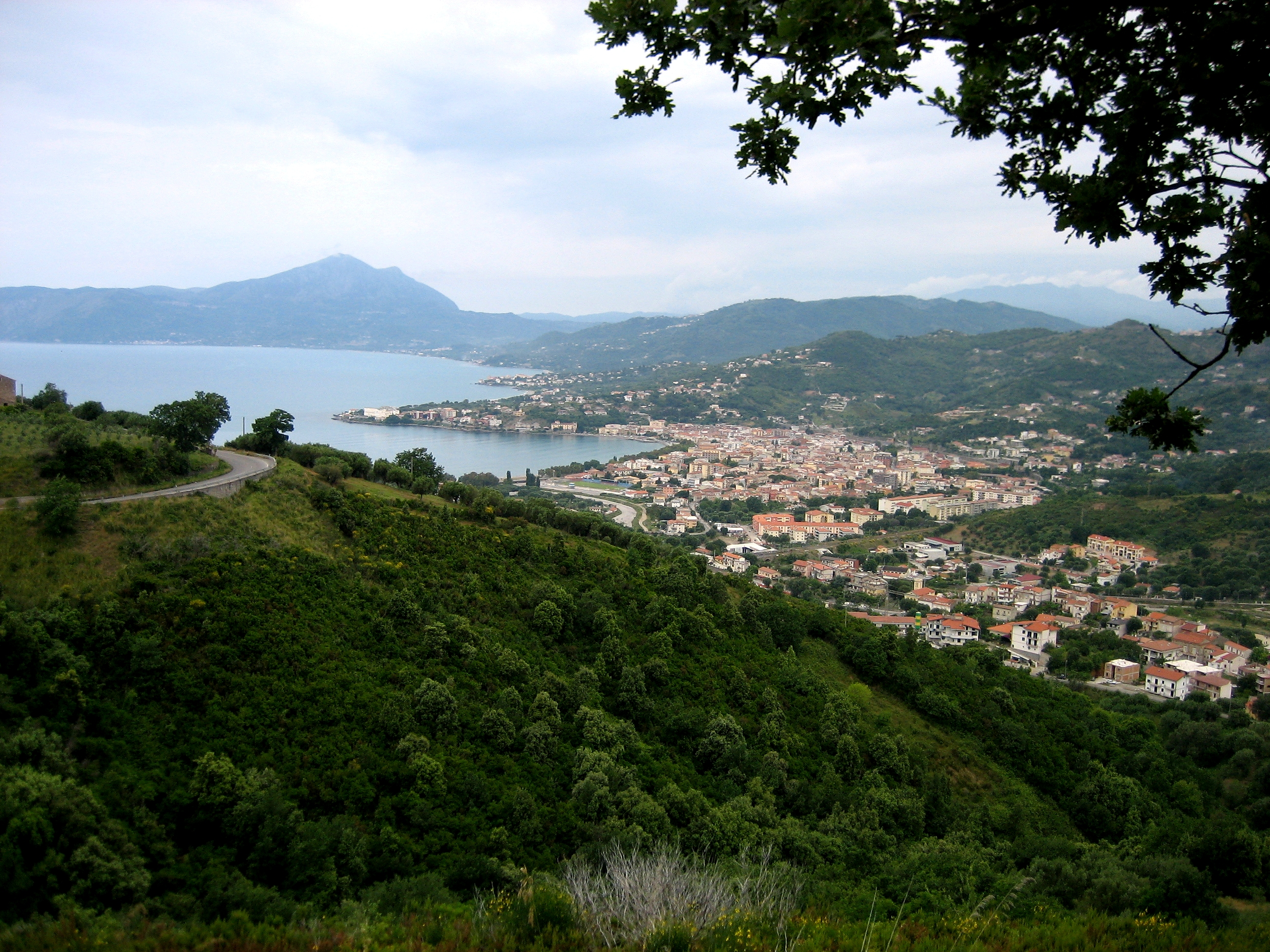
Panoramic view of Sapri; the railway track is visible on the side of the hill; it reaches the station in the background on the right after a wide curve

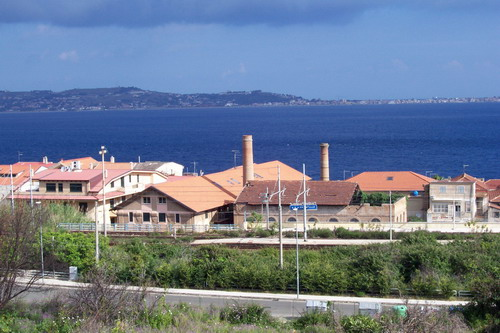
The Tyrrhenian passing through Cannitello on the Strait of Messina

The completion of the Battipaglia–Reggio Calabria railway line would have made rail transport faster and therefore more convenient; however, the bankruptcy of the Vittorio Emanuele Company in 1872 and the reassignment of responsibility for the completion of the Calabrian network to the Società per le Strade Ferrate del Mediterraneo (Mediterranean Railway Company), did not allow a rapid start of the planned works. The reorganisation of the railways was expected under the law and conventions of 1885, which confirmed the assignment of the network to the Mediterranean Railway Company, enabling the projects to be restarted quickly. Only the 50 km (31 mi)-long Battipaglia–Agropoli–Vallo della Lucania section and the 29 km (18 mi)-long Reggio Calabria–Bagnara section were built between 1883 and 1887. In the meantime construction of the line along the Vallo di Diano route began very slowly, reaching only as far as the section between Sicignano degli Alburni and Lagonegro in 1892 but not continuing any further.

In 1887, the railway was completed in the section between Nicotera and Gioia Tauro and, in 1888, it was extended to Bagnara, but it was not until 1894 that Nicotera was connected with Pizzo and Sant'Eufemia Marina, which was renamed Lamezia Terme in 1968.

In 1895, after 20 years of work, the Battipaglia–Paola–Reggio Calabria railway was completed. This required very extensive engineering works, with the excavation of numerous long tunnels between Agropoli and Scalea and between Palmi and Villa San Giovanni and also long viaducts, especially in the central parts, in order to reduce the grades that otherwise would have been too steep. Trains only required double heading and a bank engine added in the rear between Agropoli and Vallo della Lucania.

The Tyrrhenian line immediately proved to be the fastest and most economical means of transport and had a continuous and constant increase in freight and passenger traffic. The transport service was superior to those offered by the steam ships that carried the coastal traffic between the small ports of the Calabrian region and those of Salerno and Naples, the stagecoaches for the carriage of passengers and the very slow animal-hauled wagons.

As a result of the railway, new employment and new industrial centres were created, such as Paola and Sant'Eufemia-Lamezia, which would become the starting point for the planned transversal lines to Catanzaro and Cosenza, as well as to Gioia Tauro, with the construction of an east–west line of the 950 mm (3 ft 1 3/8 in) Calabro Lucane railways. Tourist developments, such as the spa of Terme Luigiane in Acquappesa for which the Guardia Piemontese station was built, as well as hotels in Paola and Sapri, and freight yards, stations, locomotive depots at Sapri, Paola, Sant'Eufemia and maintenance workshops in Paola. However, a link between Cosenza and Nocera Terinese, which would have linked the Ionian and Tyrrhenian seas by connecting to the already built Cosenza-Sibari railway, creating a useful east–west link between the Adriatic-Ionian line and the south, was not realised, although it had been authorised in the Baccarini Law of 1879.

As early as 1908, the municipal administrations and notables from the Taurese district held meetings to promote the construction of the projected Gioia Tauro–Gioiosa Ionica railway and branches. The government approved the construction of the railway by decree no. 135 of 26 January 1911, but as a narrow-gauge line. The first 13 km section was completed between Gioia Tauro, Palmi and Seminara tn 1917 and it was extended to Sinopoli in 1928.

The construction of the Gioia Tauro–Rizziconi–Radicena (Taurianova) trunk line, continuing to Cittanova, was authorised by Royal Decree no. 2119 of 24 July 1919. The line was inaugurated and later extended to Cinquefrondi on 1 June 1924. Nevertheless, the connection between the two seas was never completed.

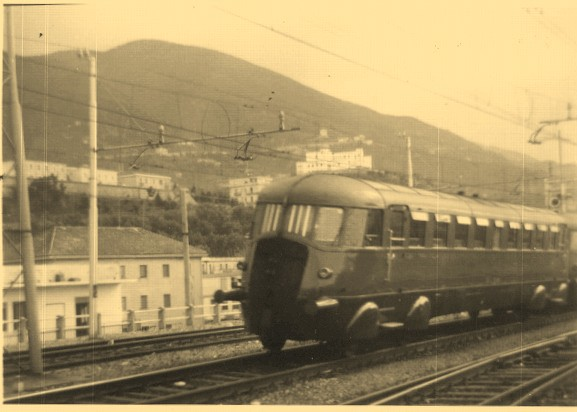
Railcar ALn1900, coming from Cosenza via a rack railway line, arriving at Paola station in 1971

Between 1907 and 1911, work began on the construction of the Paola–Cosenza railway, using the Strub rack system. This branched off in Castiglione Cosentino to Cosenza and Sibari, where it met the Ionian line to Metaponto and Taranto. A few years later, San Giovanni in Fiore and Catanzaro were connected to Cosenza, but the use of narrow gauge severely limited the lines' performance and usefulness.

The connection to the Port of Salerno, which branched off from the line a few tens of metres before entering Salerno station, was inaugurated in 1925 and was in use until 2006.

In 1939, the electrification was completed up to Reggio Calabria. The 1,310 km (810 mi)-long electrified route from Milan was considered a work of great importance at the time and had required the use of 691 electric locomotives, made up of three classes, E.626, E.326 and E.428.

In 1961, the double track between the Gioia Tauro and Villa San Giovanni stations was activated; as part of the work, the stations of Taureana, Palmi, Bagnara and Favazzina were rebuilt with the erection of new station buildings

In the sixties, the line had reached saturation following a substantial increase in passenger and freight traffic, especially of foodstuffs coming from Sicily; this required the doubling of the track, which was implemented through the widening of the existing right of ways and tunnels, the construction of deviations and the construction of viaducts and long tunnels, especially on the routes between Agropoli and Praia a Mare and between Palmi and Villa San Giovanni. The first cycle of strengthening works ended at the end of the sixties.

In the seventies, the second phase of structural strengthening was carried out with the construction of two sections that formed complete deviations from the old route: the Praia–Scalea section, which is almost entirely in a new double track tunnel, was opened at the end of 1970 and the so-called direttissima (Italian for "most direct") between Rosarno and Lamezia (then called Sant'Eufemia-Lametia), which rejoined the old route at the Eccellente crossing loop with the creation of a junction, was opened in 1972. This route required the excavation of long tunnels and the construction of the long and imposing Angitola Viaduct, an impressive piece of engineering designed by the Neapolitan engineer Alberto Petrillo. The old route passing through Pizzo Calabro, Tropea and Nicotera was not abandoned, but remained a single track and used for regional or medium-distance traffic, without being improved in any way despite its considerable tourist potential.

The next series of works was aimed at strengthening the east–west connections: the new 20.5 km (12.7 mi)-long Paola–Cosenza railway went into operation on 31 May 1987 together with the new Cosenza railway station passing below the old "Crocetta" pass over the Apennine chain through the 15.332 km (9.527 mi)-long Monte Santomarco Tunnel. The new railway, in addition to benefiting the travellers and commuters of the area, had the function of creating a new alternative route for connections between Sicily, Calabria, Apulia and the Adriatic regions and overall between the south and the north.

Work on the Lamezia–Catanzaro east-west line started in the nineties and was finished in 2008 with the construction of a deviation and the new Catanzaro station.

The whole line is affected by planning to integrate it in Corridor 1 (Berlin–Palermo) of the Trans-European high-speed rail network. While the quadruplication of the initial stretch between Salerno and Battipaglia is almost complete, there is uncertainty over choosing between the construction of major route deviations or the upgrading of the current route, starting from the most problematic part of the Campania-Basilicata section, through the Cilento to the mouth of the Noce-Castrocucco.

On 12 December 2010, the stations of Eccellente, Rutino, San Mauro la Bruca, San Nicola Varco and Torchiara were downgraded to crossing loops; at the same time the stations of Cirella, Sangineto, San Nicola Arcella and Villa San Giovanni Bolano were closed.

== Features ==
The Battipaglia–Reggio Calabria railway was built with a single track and operated with steam traction. It was connected to the existing Salerno–Battipaglia–Potenza railway but soon became one of the main axes of north–south rail traffic, with rolling stock also continuing across the Strait of Messina by ferry.

It was electrified in the thirties at 3,000 volts DC. Doubling of the track and raising of line speeds started after the war. During the 1960s, the new tracks between Battipaglia and Praia a Mare, Scalea and Eccellente, Rosarno and Villa San Giovanni were progressively opened. At the beginning of the 1970s, the connecting double-track section between Scalea and Praia a Mare was opened and a few years later the connecting double-track section between Rosarno and Eccellente was also opened. The doubling of the last stretch between Villa San Giovanni and Reggio Calabria had to wait much longer.

The Port of Gioia Tauro is connected to the line and has a railway yard with six sets of tracks, which allows the loading of six trains at a time and the operation of train-loads of containers on the national RFI network.

Automatic block with coded currents is implemented between Battipaglia and Reggio Calabria and automatic block signaling with axle counters (blocco elettrico conta-assi) is implemented between Eccellente and Rosarno. Centralized traffic control (C.T.C.) is used on both sections of line.

The stations of the Rosarno–Reggio Calabria section are also served by a suburban rail service.

== Route ==
Almost all of the line runs on the Calabria-Basilicata-Campania coast and long stretches pass through tunnel. Because of the difficult orography in the sections running through Basilicata and central Campania and in southern Calabrian, the two tracks do not run parallel in some places but use different tunnels or bridges.

A new line that was double-track and shorter was built between Eccellente and Rosarno. This means there are now two different lines: the direttissima, a double-track route passing through Vibo Valentia and Mileto, and the old single-track line via Pizzo Calabro, Tropea and Nicotera.

Trains are loaded at the port of Villa San Giovanni for the voyage to Sicily and to continue over the Palermo–Messina and the Messina–Syracuse railways.

== See also ==
- List of railway lines in Italy
- Salerno railway station
- Ferrovie Calabro Lucane
