= Battipaglia railway station =

Railway station in Italy

Battipaglia
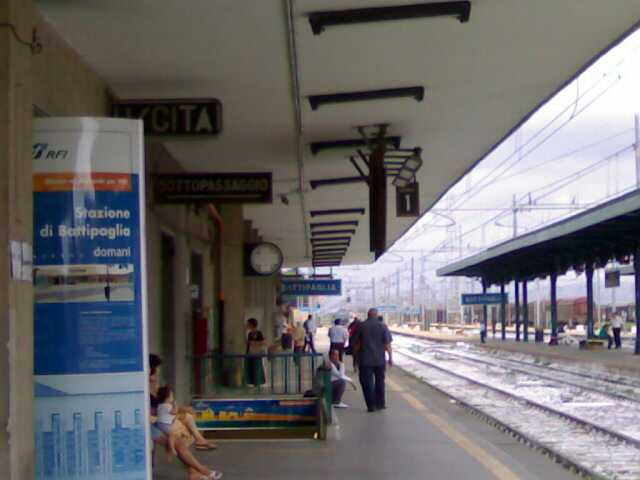
- Battipaglia railway station

General information
- Location: Battipaglia, Province of Salerno, Campania; Italy
- Coordinates: 40°36′18″N 14°59′05″E
- Owner: Rete Ferroviaria Italiana
- Operator: Trenitalia
- Lines: Salerno–Reggio Calabria railway Battipaglia–Metaponto railway

History
- Opened: 1863

Services
Preceding station	Trenitalia	Following station
Salerno towards Milano Centrale	InterCity Notte; Milan–Syracuse	Agropoli–Castellabate towards Siracusa
Location
- Location within Campania Location within Italy

Battipaglia is a railway station in Battipaglia, Italy. The station is located on the Salerno–Reggio Calabria railway and Battipaglia–Metaponto railway. The train services are operated by Trenitalia.

== Train services ==
The station is served by the following service(s):

- Intercity services Rome - Naples - Salerno - Lamezia Terme - Reggio di Calabria
- Intercity services Rome - Naples - Salerno - Taranto
- Regional services (Treno regionale) Naples - Salerno - Agropoli - Sapri - Cosenza
- Regional services (Treno regionale) Naples - Salerno - Potenza - Metaponto - Taranto
