= Ionian Railway =

Railway line in Italy

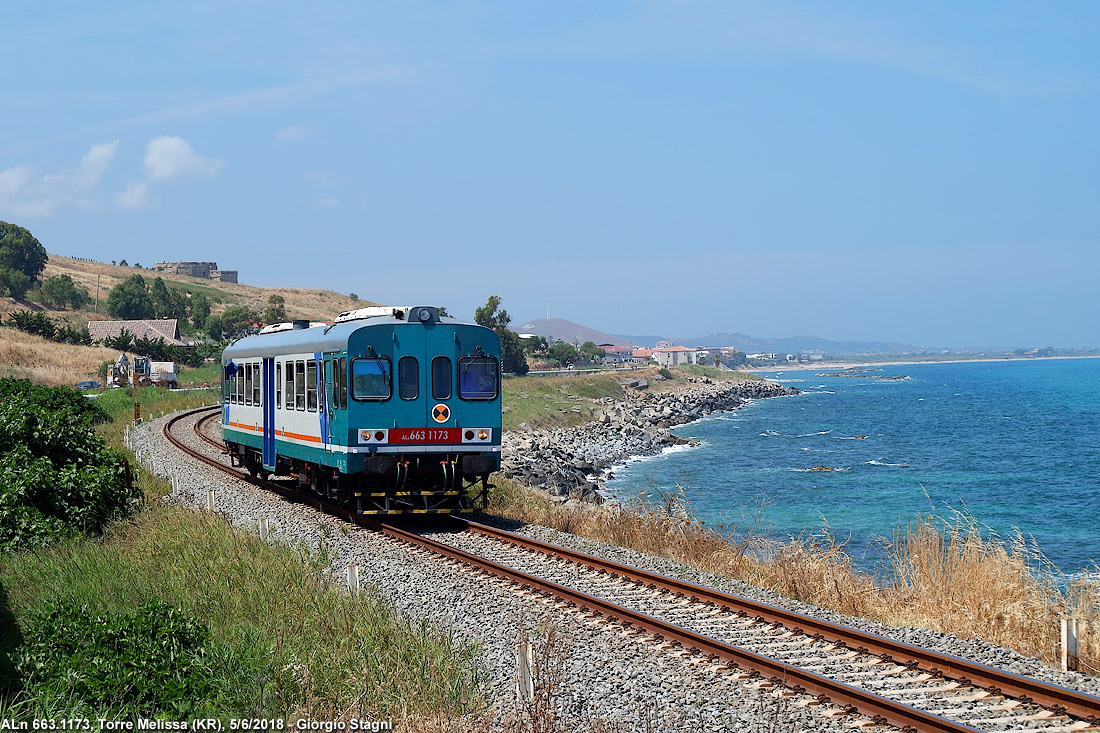
- Train along the line in 2018.

Overview
- Status: in use
- Owner: RFI
- Line number: 135
- Locale: Italy
- Termini: Taranto railway station; Reggio di Calabria Centrale railway station

Service
- Type: Heavy rail
- Operator(s): Trenitalia

History
- Opened: In stages between 1866 and 1875

Technical
- Line length: 472 km (293 mi)
- Number of tracks: Single track
- Track gauge: 1,435 mm (4 ft 8 1/2 in) standard gauge
- Electrification: Electrified at 3000 V DC (Taranto to Sibari; Melito di Porto Salvo to Reggio Calabria)

The Ionian Railway (Ferrovia Jonica) is an Italian 472-kilometre (293-mile) long railway line that connects Taranto, with Sibari, Crotone and Reggio Calabria. The route operates through the regions of Apulia, Basilicata and Calabria. The route largely follows the coast of the Ionian Sea.

== History ==
The line was opened in stages between 1866 and 1875.

Date	Section
3 June 1866	Reggio Calabria - Lazzaro
1 October 1868	Lazzaro - Bianco
28 February 1869	Taranto – Marconia
18 August 1869	Marconia – Trebisacce
6 March 1870	Trebisacce – Rossano
16 June 1870	Rossano – Cariati
1 February 1871	Bianco – Roccella Jonica
1 June 1874	Cariati – Crotone
20 May 1875	Catanzaro Lido – Monasterace
15 November 1875	Crotone – Catanzaro Lido

== Developments ==
On 13 November 1989 the line between Taranto and Sibari was electrified. The line has also been electrified between Melito di Porto Salvo and Reggio Calabria to allow for the operation of a suburban service.

On 12 December 2010 Gabella Grande, Isola Capo Rizzuto, Marconia, San Leonardo di Cutro and Thurio stations were downgraded to halts. On the same date O.G.R di Saline Joniche, Pietrapaola and San Sosthenes stations closed.

On 21 February 2013 the station serving Reggio Calabria Airport opened, linking it to the city. On 9 June 2013 the station Melito di Porto Salvo opened in Annà.

== Usage ==
The line is used by the following service(s):

- Intercity services Rome - Naples - Salerno - Taranto
- Intercity services Reggio di Calabria - Siderno - Crotone - Sibari - Taranto
- Regional services (Treno regionale) Naples - Salerno - Potenza - Metaponto - Taranto
- Regional services (Treno regionale) Sibari - Monte Giordano - Metaponto
- Regional services (Treno regionale) Sibari - Crotone - Catanzaro Lido
- Regional services (Treno regionale) Catanzaro Lido - Roccela Jonica - Reggio di Calabria
- Regional services (Treno regionale) Melito di Porto Salvo - Reggio di Calabria - Villa San Giovanni

== Stations currently without services ==
The following stations on the Ionian Railway are currently not served by any railway service:

- Scanzano Jonico-Montalbano Jonico (freight trains only)
- Sinni (dismissed)
- Nova Siri-Rotondella (without any train service)
- Rocca Imperiale (without any train service)
- Montegiordano (without any train service)
- Roseto-Capo Spulico (without any train service)
- Amendolara-Oriolo (without any train service)
- Toscano (dismissed - regional trains to/from Sibari, Crotone, and Catanzaro Lido call only on the opening days of the Odissea 2000 water park)
- Pietrapaola (dismissed)
- Roccabernarda (dismissed)
- San Sostiene (dismissed)
- Capo Spartivento (dismissed)

The following former railway stations on the line have been converted to signalling controls:

- Bosco Pineto
- Thurio
- Gabella Grande
- Isola di Capo Rizzuto
- San Leonardo di Cutro

== See also ==
- List of railway lines in Italy
