= Catanzaro railway station =

Railway station in the Calabria region of Italy

Catanzaro
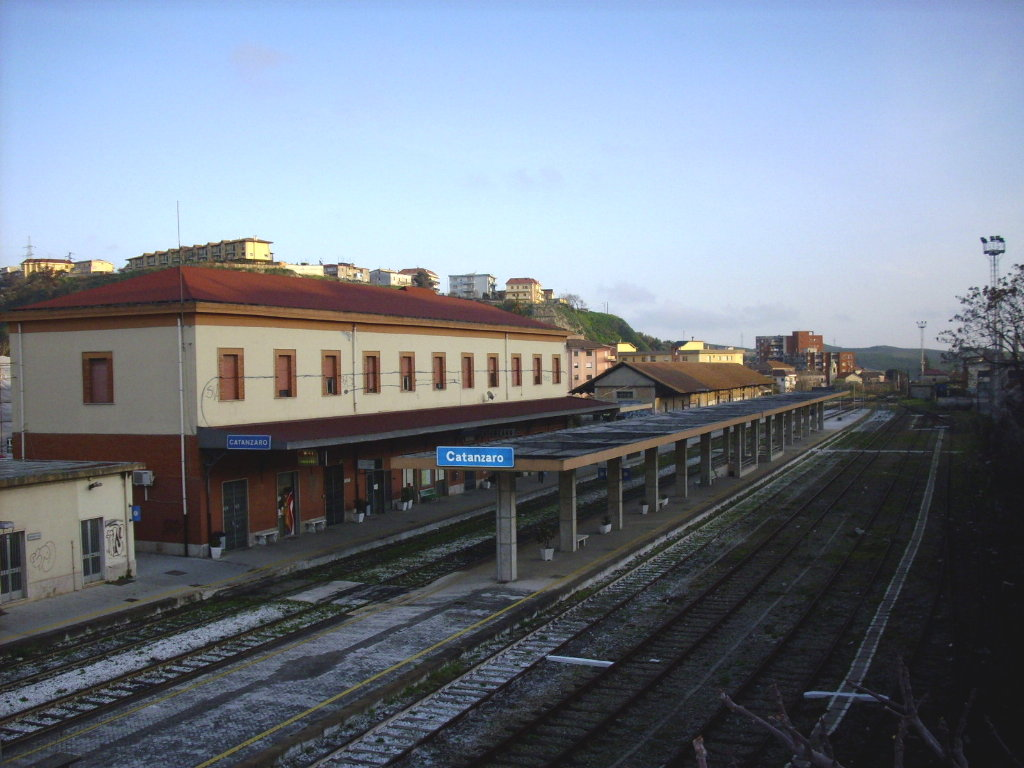
- View of the station platforms

General information
- Location: Viale della Stazione; Rione Sala - 88100 Catanzaro; Catanzaro, Catanzaro, Calabria; Italy
- Coordinates: 38°53′46.82″N 16°35′56.71″E
- Operator: Rete Ferroviaria Italiana
- Lines: Lamezia-Catanzaro Lido (FS); Cosenza-Catanzaro Lido (FC)
- Platforms: 2 (per 3 tracks, FS Side); 2 (per 3 tracks, FC side)
- Train operators: Trenitalia

History
- Opened: 31 July 1899; 127 years ago
- Closed: 15 June 2008 (old FS station)
- Rebuilt: 15 June 2008 (new FS station)
Location
- Location within Calabria Location within Italy

Catanzaro, commonly known as Catanzaro Sala for the position in Sala quarter and due to the name of the adjacent FC station, is a railway station of the Italian city of Catanzaro, in Calabria region.

Owned by the Ferrovie dello Stato it is one of the main stations of the city along with Catanzaro Lido. In 2008 a new Catanzaro station, colloquially known as Catanzaro Germaneto, has been inaugurated in the suburban quarter of Germaneto on a new bypass of FS line. Due for this reason the old station was closed for FS services, but not for the suburban railway owned by FC.

== History ==
The station was opened on July 31, 1899, as part of a line that linked the centre of the city to the Jonian (serving Catanzaro Lido) and the Tyrrhenian (serving Lamezia Terme Centrale) lines. On July 10, 1933, it was inaugurated the adjacent Catanzaro Sala station, owned by the Ferrovie della Calabria (FC) and part of the Cosenza-Catanzaro Lido line.

In 1998 it was re-opened a funicular built in 1910 and operating still 1954. The funicular was built to link the central station to the city centre crossing the height difference (154.60 m). A few years later funicular's re-opening it started operating a suburban rail service on the FC line, colloquially named Metropolitana di Catanzaro (Catanzaro Subway), also due to the increased number of train stops in the city.

After the closure in 2008 the FS station was abandoned. Some projects, as the one to use the old line to Lido, have been considered. In latest 2009 it was announced a project, named "Pendolo", to link it to the new Germaneto station with a future line. This project has been considered as a possibility to the new station to have a link to the hub of the suburban rail service; and this new junction may be part of it as a second line.

== Catanzaro Germaneto ==
The new railway station, located in the south-western suburb of the city (Coordinates: 38°51′55.74″N 16°33′46.67″E) and 6 km far from the old and homonymous one, was opened on June 15, 2008. Located on a bypass of the Lamezia Terme-Catanzaro Lido line (from Marcellinara to Catanzaro Lido ), built in the early 2000s to avoid the curves and the tunnels of the old and partly decaying route, it has replaced the historical central station. The new train stop, officially named Catanzaro but commonly Catanzaro Germaneto to distinguish it from the old structures, serves the government offices of the region and the campus of the Magna Græcia University, located not too far from it.

Germaneto has a modern one-floor station building and counts 2 platforms used by 3 tracks . The new line is not electrified as the old one but a project to electrify it has been considered.

== Structure ==
The station counts a large two-floor building and, close to the structure, is located the depot building. It counts two covered platforms used by three tracks, and other three were used by goods wagons. The railway line is not electrified and the track gauge is 1,435 mm (4 ft 8 1/2 in). Due to the abandon after 2008 the station's structures are partly decaying. In front of it is located the building of Sala FC station, the one still operating. The building is closed and has no services. The FC station counts 2 little platforms used by 3 tracks. The line is not electrified and the track gauge is 950 mm (3 ft 1 3/8 in) narrow gauge.

== Transport ==
- Ferrovie dello Stato (FS): After the 2008 closure there are no train services in the historical station, moved to Germaneto. It counts several regional trains to Lamezia Terme, Catanzaro Lido and some to Reggio Calabria Centrale, Locri and Rosarno. For long-distance transport it counts some InterCity and Express trains to Rome, Turin and Milan, linking it also with Genoa, Naples, Bologna, Florence, Pisa and other cities.
- Ferrovie della Calabria (FC): The station is served by the suburban rail. The trains run every 20–30 minutes between Catanzaro Città (CZ City) and Catanzaro Lido. Before the opening of this service the station was served by some regional trains to Cosenza, now ending at Catanzaro Città. Also the funicular service is owned by the FC.

== Gallery ==
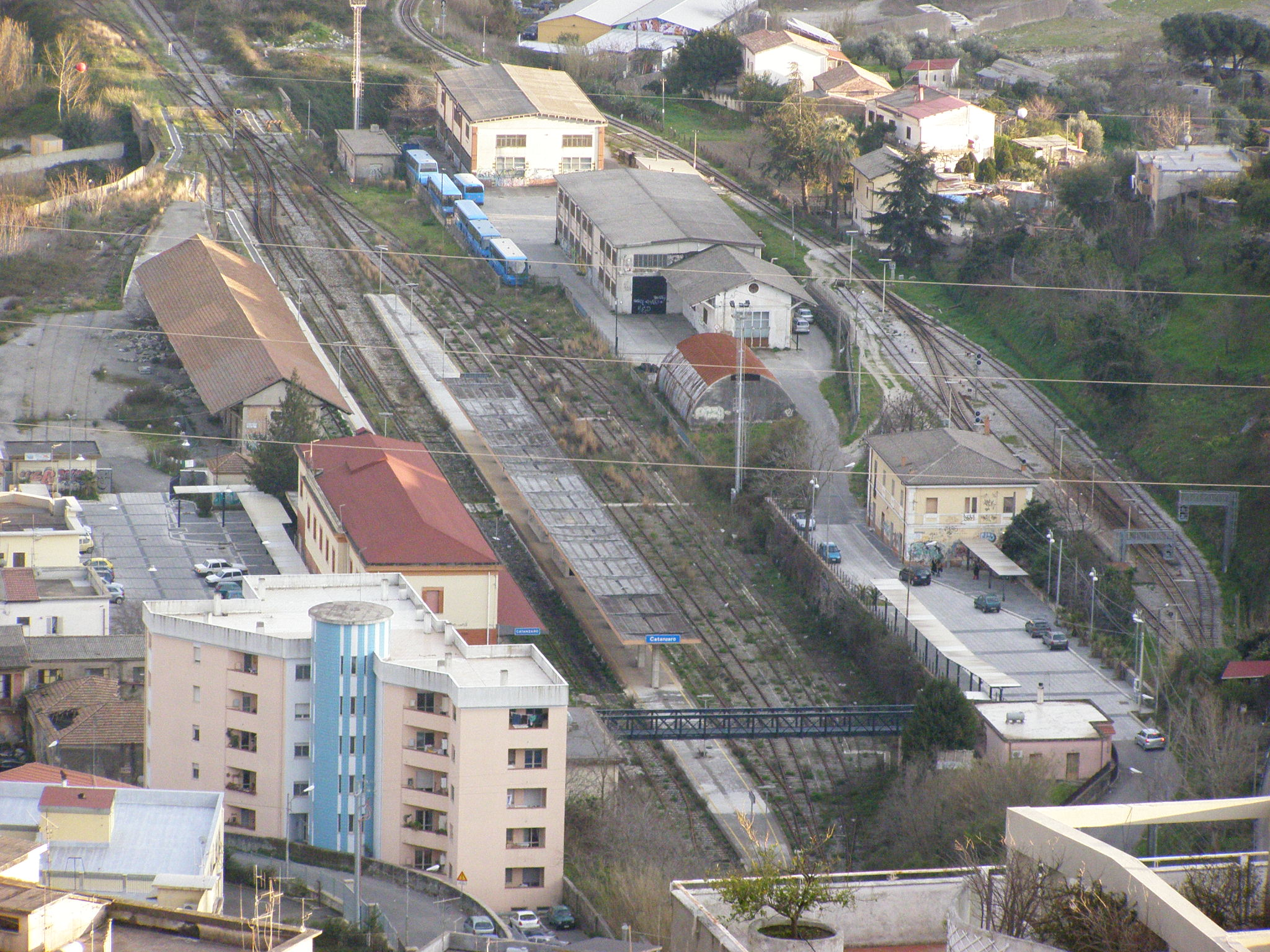
View of the station. On the left side of the picture, the abandoned FS tracks and building. On the right side, the FC station building and tracks.

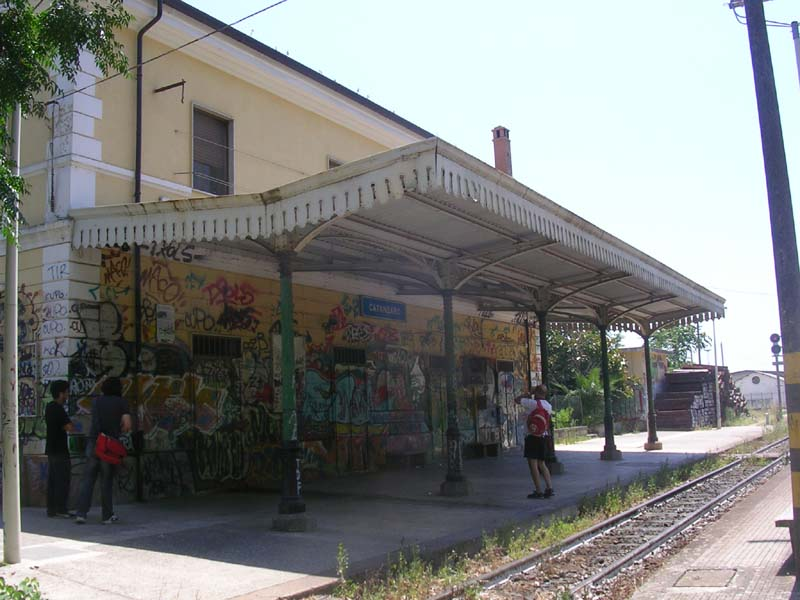
The FC station building.

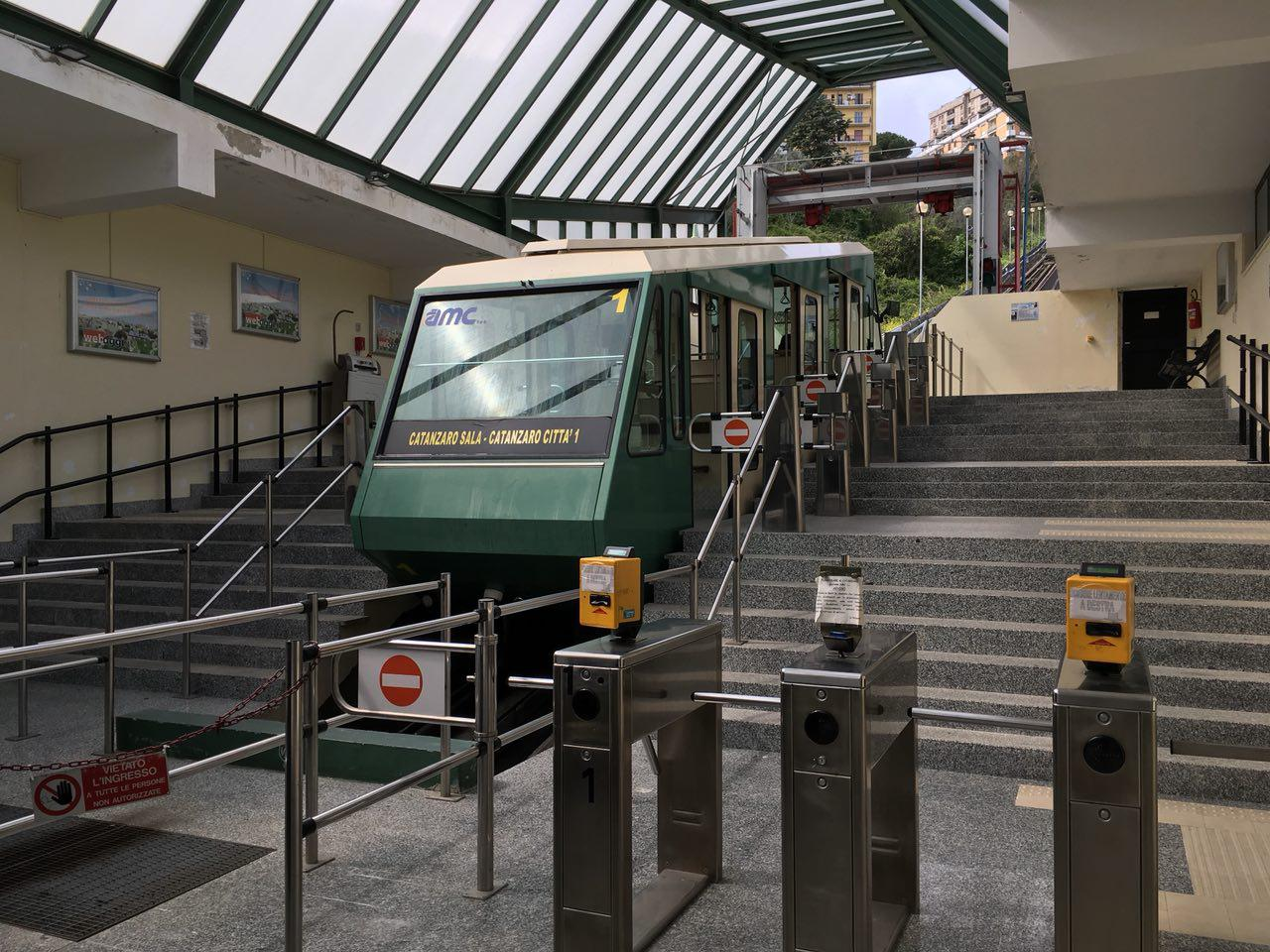
Funicular station "Catanzaro Sala", located close to the railway station.

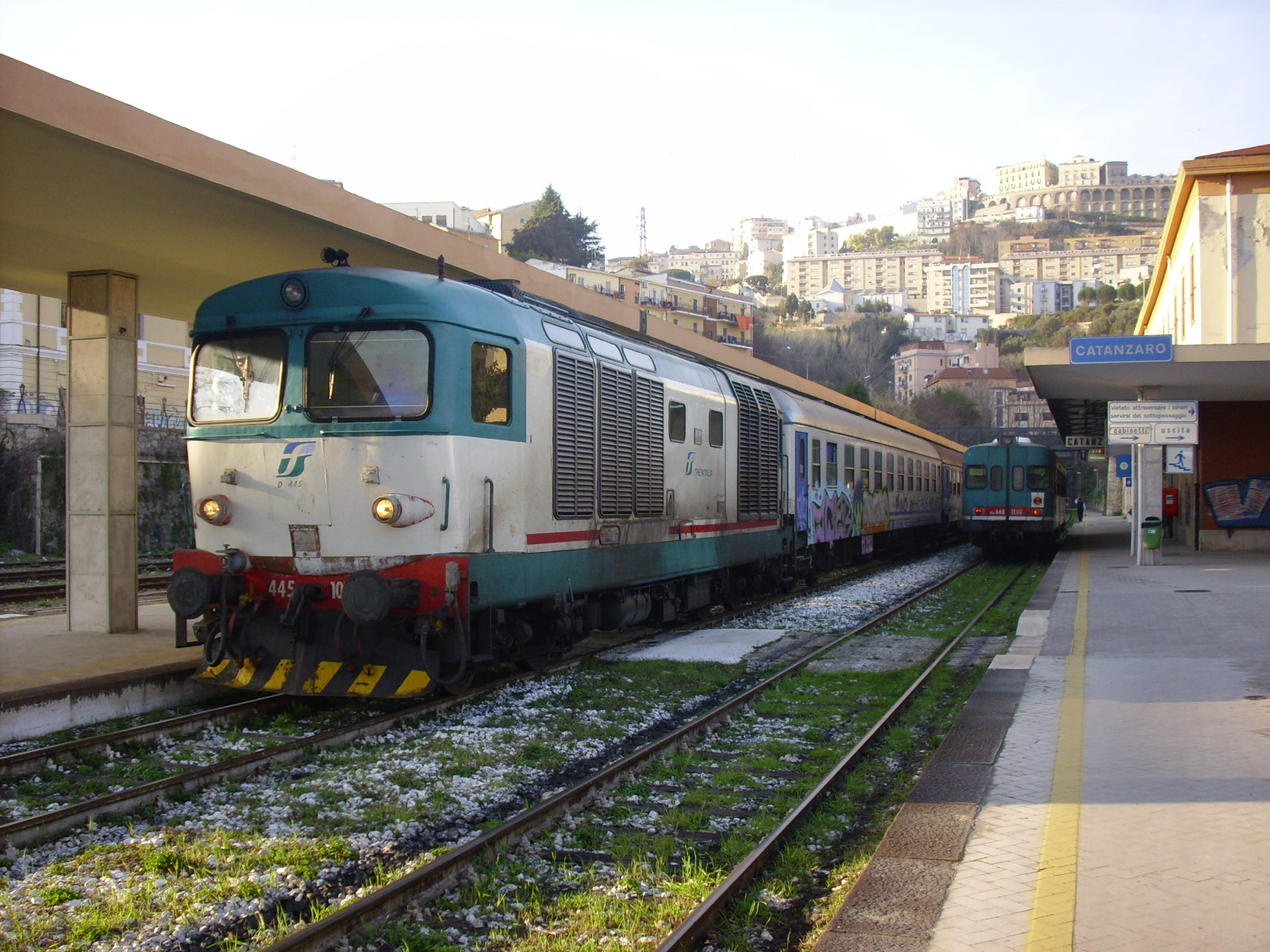
A couple of trains at the platforms 1 and 2

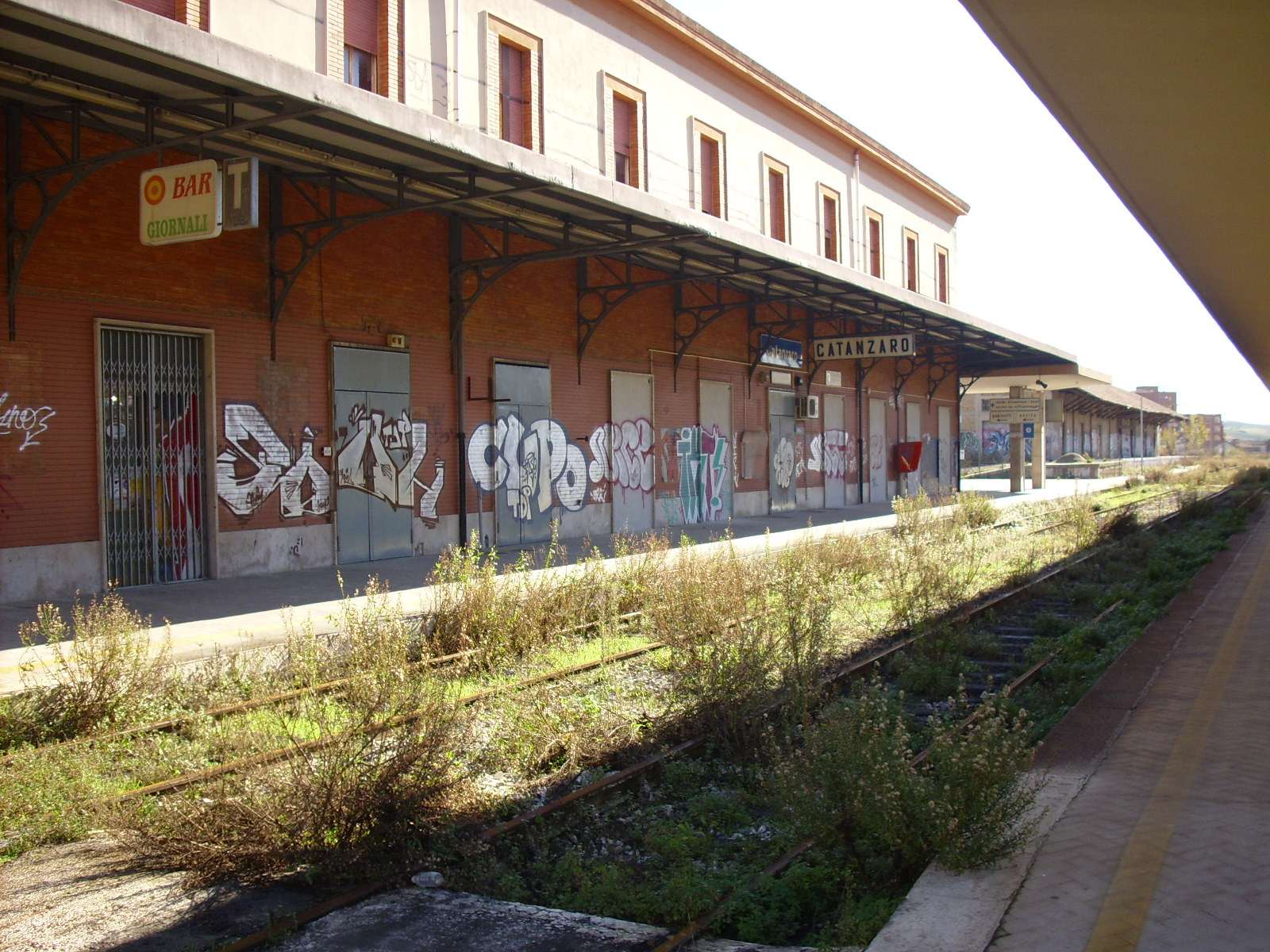
The abandoned station building in 2010.

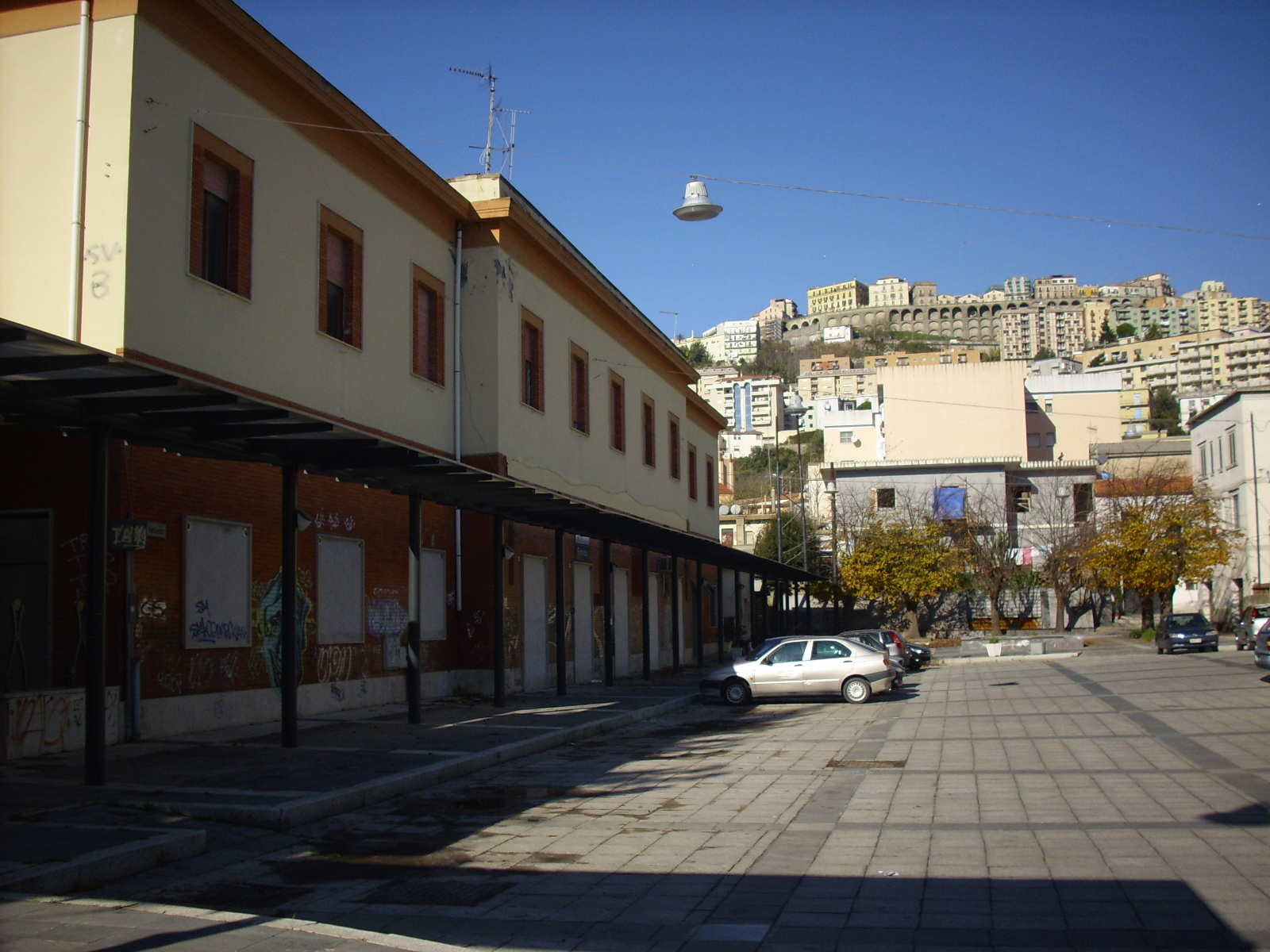
Exterior of the closed station building in 2010.

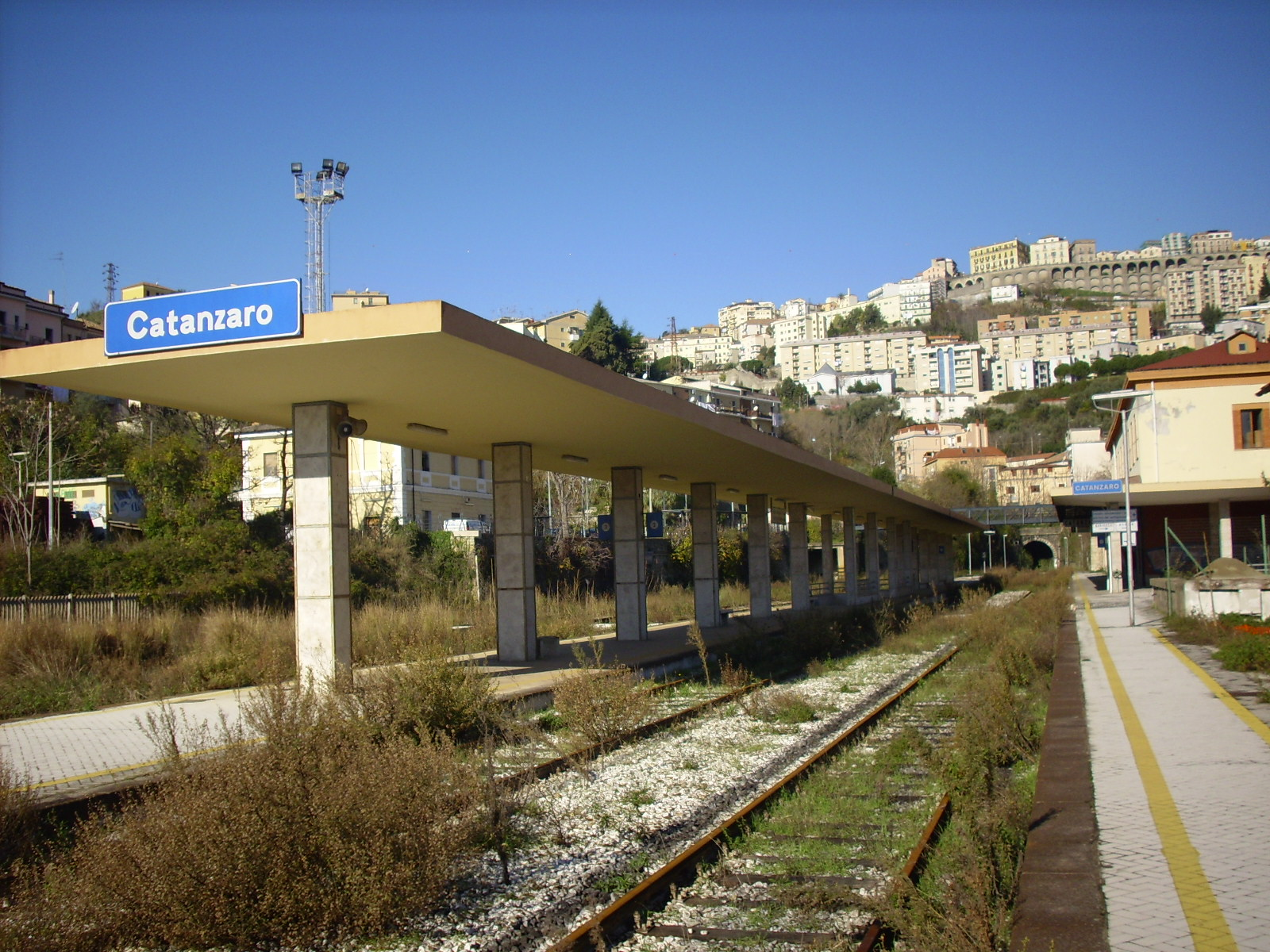
View of the abandoned station in 2010. In background the city centre and the tunnel of Sansinato. In the left side, behind the roof, it is possible to see the FC station building.

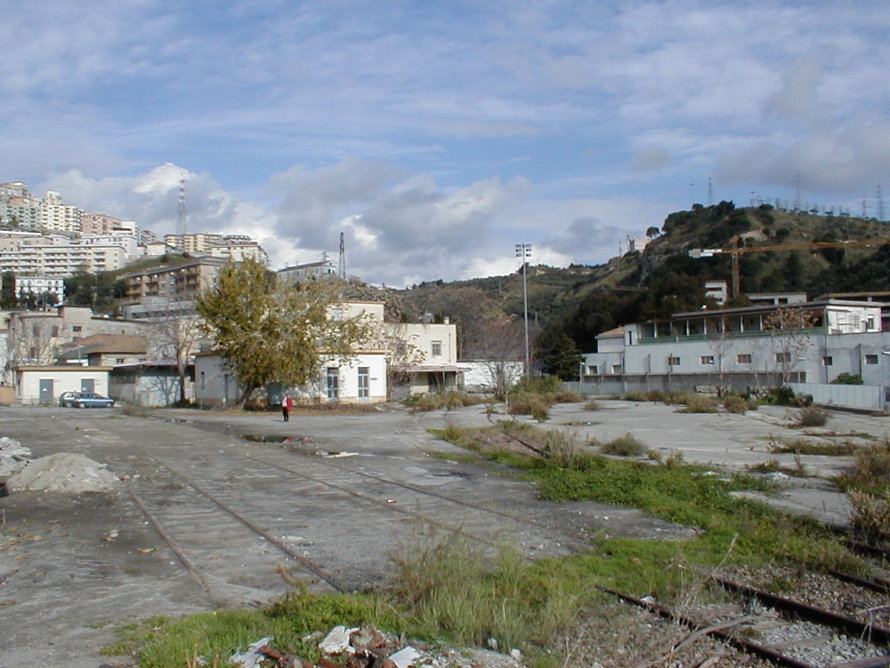
The abandoned freight depot

== See also ==
- Catanzaro Lido railway station
- Catanzaro Città railway station
- List of railway stations in Calabria
- History of rail transport in Italy
- Rail transport in Italy
- Railway stations in Italy
