= Camerota (surname) =

Camerota is an Italian surname.

== List of people with the surname ==
- Alfanus of Camerota, 12th century Italian priest
- Alisyn Camerota (born 1966), American journalist and television anchor
- Brett Camerota (born 1985), American Nordic combined skier
- Eric Camerota (born 1985), American Nordic combined skier
- Florius of Camerota, Italian political figure

== See also ==
- Camerota
