= Schettino =

Schettino is an Italian surname. Notable people with the surname include:

- Alberto Schettino (born 1984), Italian footballer
- Bruno Schettino (1941–2012), Italian Roman Catholic archbishop
- Francesco Schettino (born 1960), Italian sea captain during the Costa Concordia disaster and convicted criminal
