= Catanzaro Lido railway station =

Railway station in the Calabria region of Italy

Catanzaro Lido
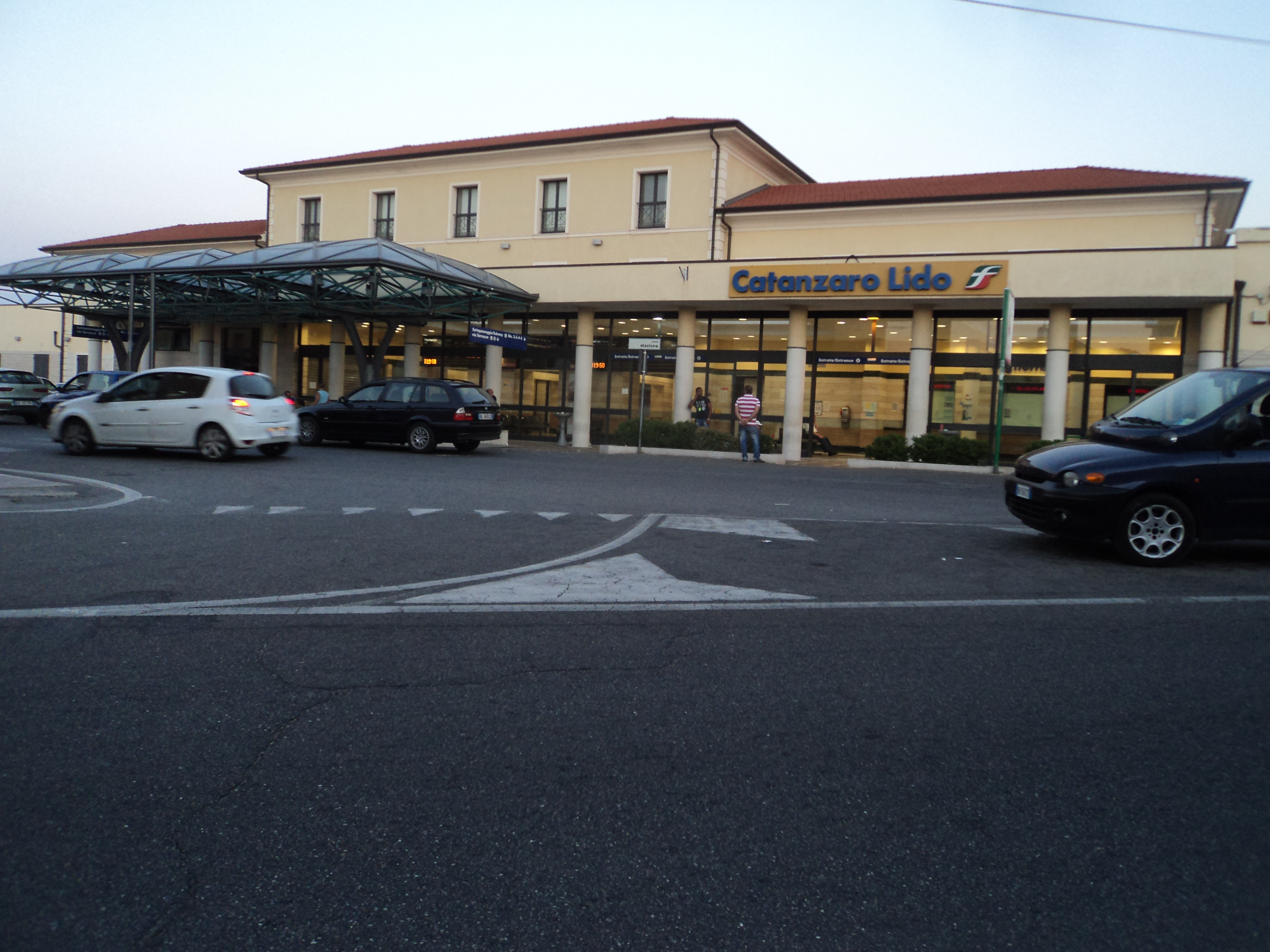

General information
- Location: Piazzale Stazione; 88100 Catanzaro CZ; Catanzaro, Catanzaro, Calabria; Italy
- Coordinates: 38°49′19″N 16°36′46″E
- Operator: Rete Ferroviaria Italiana; Centostazioni
- Lines: Taranto–Reggio Calabria; Lamezia Terme–Catanzaro Lido
- Distance: 294.720 km (183.131 mi) from Taranto
- Train operators: Trenitalia
- Connections: Urban and suburban buses

Other information
- Classification: Gold

History
- Opened: 20 May 1875; 151 years ago
Location
- Location within Calabria Location within Italy

Catanzaro Lido railway station (Italian: Stazione di Catanzaro Lido) is one of the railway stations serving the city and comune of Catanzaro, capital of the Calabria region, southern Italy. Opened in 1875, it forms part of the Jonica railway (Taranto–Reggio Calabria), and is also a terminus of a secondary line, the Lamezia Terme–Catanzaro Lido railway.

The station is currently managed by Rete Ferroviaria Italiana (RFI). However, the commercial area of the passenger building is managed by Centostazioni. The station's main line train services are operated by or on behalf of Trenitalia. Each of these companies is a subsidiary of Ferrovie dello Stato (FS), Italy's state-owned rail company.

The nearby Catanzaro Lido railway station (FC), operated by the Ferrovie della Calabria (FC), is a terminus of a metre gauge line from Cosenza, and there is convenient interchange between the two stations.

== Location ==
Catanzaro Lido railway station is situated at Piazzale Stazione, in the Lido district of Catanzaro.

== History ==
The station was opened on 20 May 1875, together with the rest of the Catanzano Lido–Monasterace section of the Jonica railway.

At that time, the station was known as Marina di Catanzaro. On 15 November 1875, it became a through station, upon the inauguration of the final section of the Jonica railway, between Crotone (then known as Cotrone) and Catanzaro Lido.

The station's first operator was the Società per le Strade Ferrate Meridionali (English: Company for the Southern Railways, SFM).

Initially, the Jonica railway was very important. Until the completion of the Southern Tyrrhenian railway in the late nineteenth century, it was the only link from the far south of mainland Italy (and Sicily) to the centre and north of the peninsula. Prior to 1890, when the Metaponto–Potenza–Battipaglia railway came into operation, it was the essential connection to Naples and Rome.

The line's importance waned as the Southern Tyrrhenian railway diverted most of its traffic via Salerno and Naples. However, as a strategic link between the Tyrrhenian and Ionian seas, it was a target of Allied bombing during World War II. Track 1 at the station now has a plaque in memory of the railwaymen who fell in World War II, and also in memory of the bombing of the station itself.

After the war, the station appeared to have a brighter future, so it was rebuilt in its present form, and the entire goods yard and locomotive shed were rearranged. In 2007, substantial restyling renewed the station's appearance, and made it more secure and comfortable.

== Train services ==
The station is served by the following service(s):

- Intercity services Taranto - Sibari - Crotone - Catanzaro Lido - Roccella Jonica - Reggio Calabria
- Regional services (Treno regionale) Sibari - Crotone - Cantanzaro Lido
- Regional services (Treno regionale) Catanzaro Lido - Roccella Jonica - Reggio di Calabria
- Regional services (Treno regionale) Catanzaro Lido - Catanzaro - Lamezia Terme

== Features ==
=== Passenger building ===
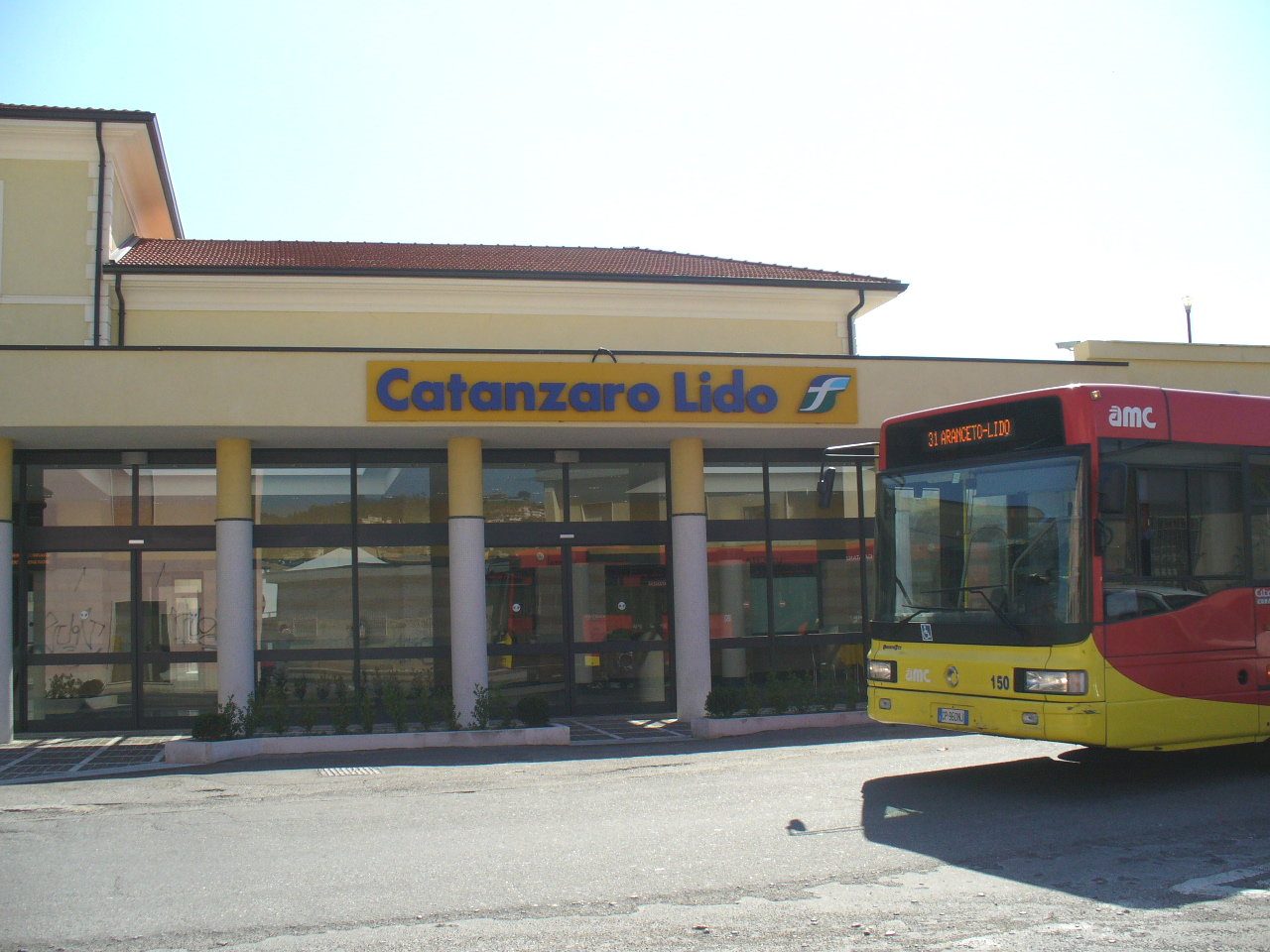
The new facade from the piazza side.

Prior to its major facelift in 2007, the passenger building at the station was virtually derelict. Today, it presents as a mix between its old design (facing the station yard) and a breath of modernity (facing the street). On the station yard side, the original structure has even been preserved and restored in its original colors, and the canopy facing track 1 has been repainted.

From the street side of the passenger building, a generous shelter in blue plexiglass, supported by an iron structure, protects its main entrances. Inside is a large hall, which is well lit, thanks to the numerous windows and the positioning of the benches. There are also a small kiosk, the three branches of the ticket office and the entrance to the bar.

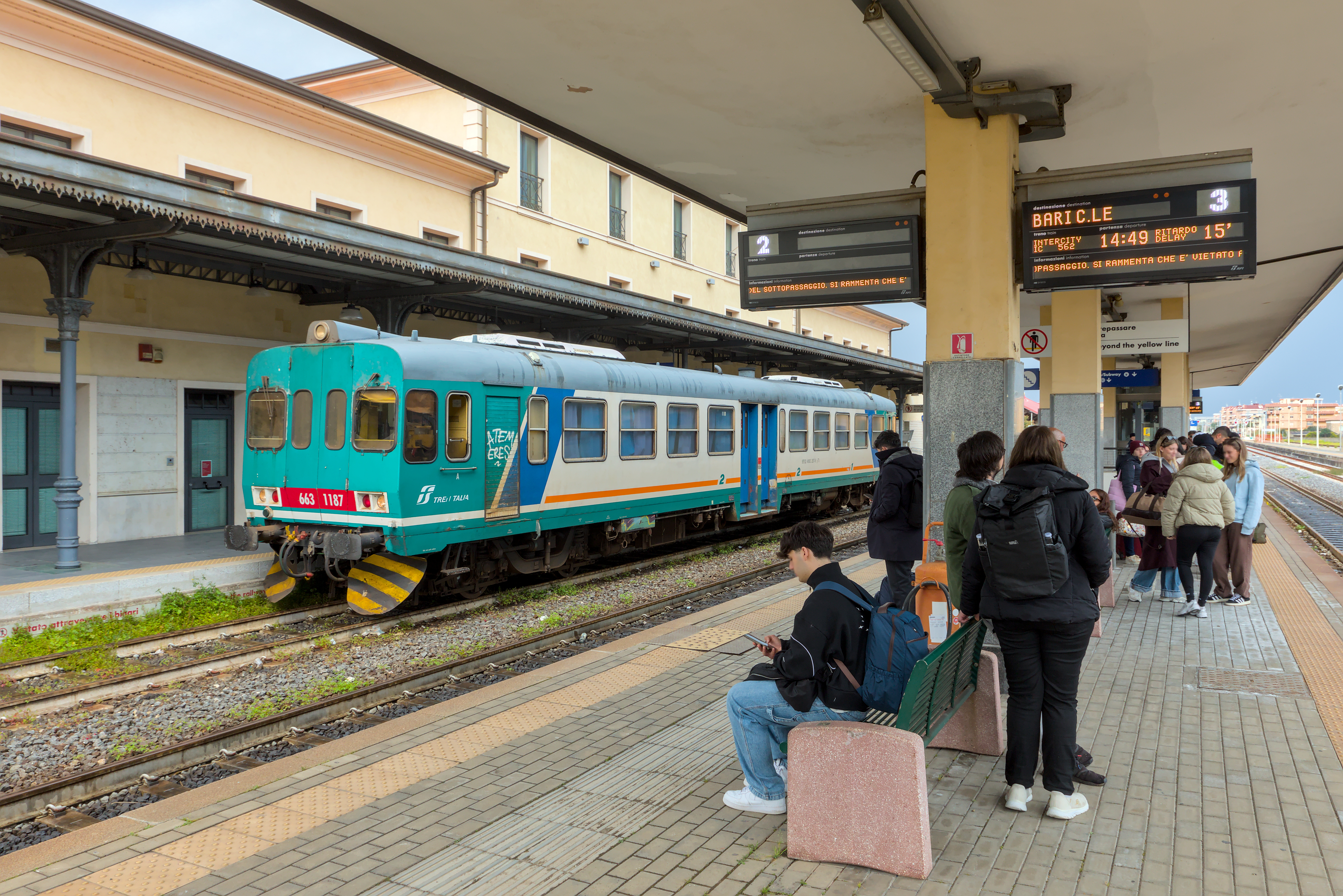
One of the platforms

Two exits lead from the passenger building to the tracks. Between those exits are the steps down to the spacious pedestrian underpass, which is equipped with monitors giving train information, and a sound system. The underpass is useful, not only to rail passengers, but also to those walking between the city centre and Marina district side to the Fortuna area. Anyone wishing to make such a connection was previously bound to use an old and historic iron bridge.

All platforms at the station are equipped with shelters, and information boards giving details of arrivals and departures. There is also a vending machine on the platform between tracks 2 and 3.

=== Track plan ===
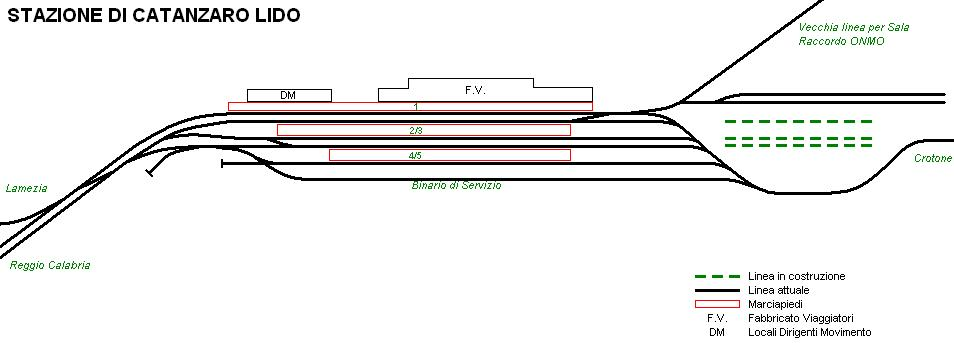
Diagram of the Catanzaro Lido track layout

Catanzaro Lido has five tracks used for passenger services, plus a sixth, on which service vehicles or passenger cars needing maintenance are often stored.

The opening in 2008 of a diversion of the Lamezia Terme line between Settingiano and Catanzaro Lido (via the new Catanzaro station) eliminated a significant constraint in the station's track layout. Previously, trains arriving from or departing to Lamezia could do so only from track 1 or track 2. The diversion has radically changed the entire track layout, which is still being finalised at the Crotone end of the station yard. The main path into the station from that end now corresponds to track 1, but the completion of that end will in all likelihood divert the main path to track 3, as it is perfectly aligned with the two outgoing lines at that end.

Also at the Crotone end of the station yard, there is a junction for ONMO (Officina Nazionale Mezzi d'Opera) next to the old line to Lamezia, near which can also be found RFI line maintenance equipment, operated by the Ventura di Paola enterprise.

== Locomotive depot and workshops ==
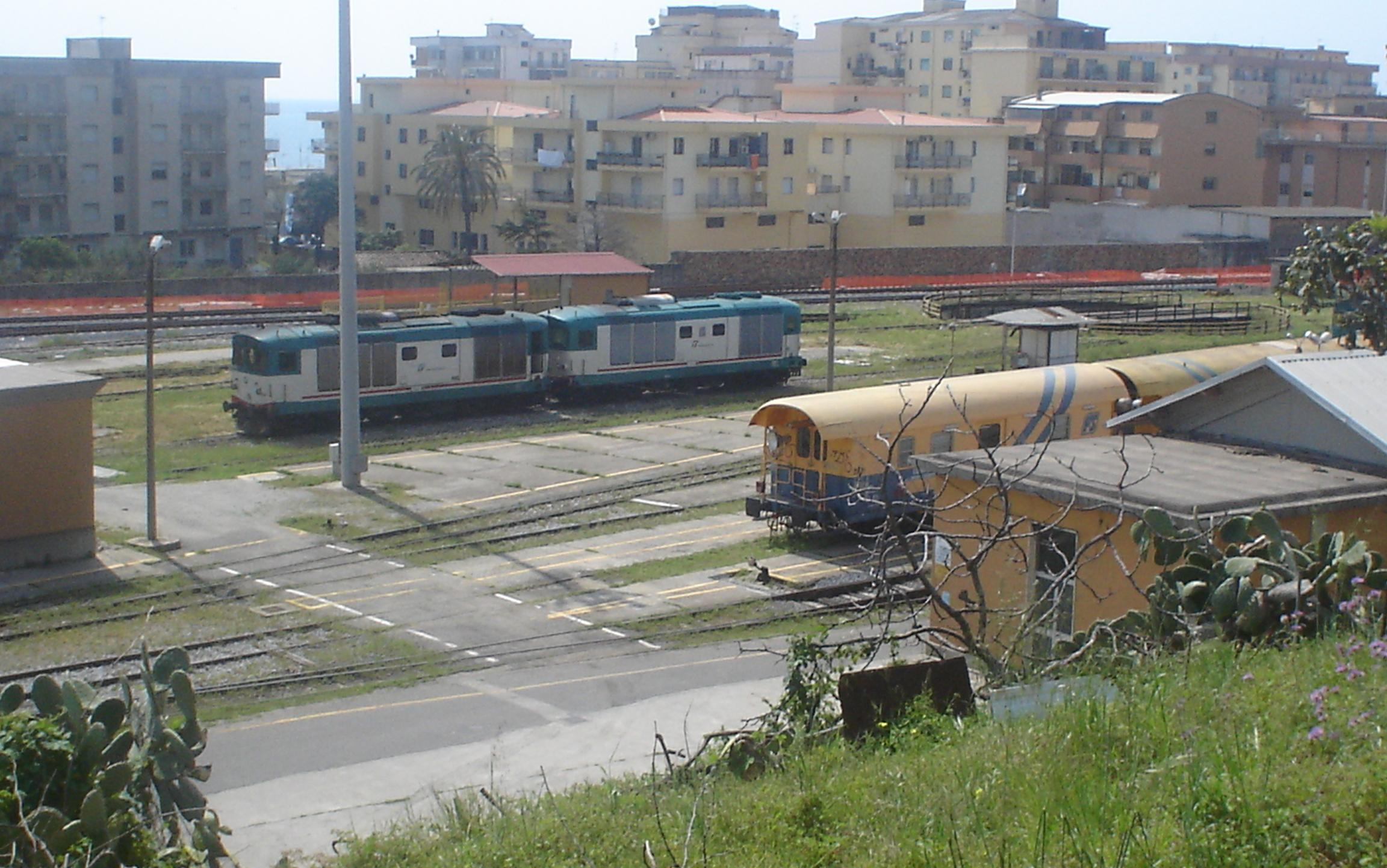
A glimpse of the locomotive depot.

Another facility at the Crotone end of the yard is the locomotive depot, which also functions as the Locomotive Maintenance Workshop (Italian: Officina Manutenzione Locomotive (OML)) of the local Regional Transport Division (Italian: Divisione Trasporto Regionale (DTR Calabria)). This facility carries out regular checks on the whole fleet of rolling stock allocated to Catanzaro Lido, as well as ensuring that they are sheltered when they are not in service.

The depot is divided into two immediately adjacent sheds. The north side shed is usually reserved solely for multiple unit trains and/or shunting locomotives (currently in service in Catanzaro Lido is one D.214). The shed closer to the active line often houses locomotives. Several different units of D.345 class diesel locomotives and Aln 668 1000 Series diesel railcars are assigned to Catanzaro Lido. They are used continuously for regional services on the Jonica railway.

The depot is also equipped with a turntable, wash stalls for both the interiors and exteriors of multiple unit trains, and, in the immediate vicinity of the station, wash stalls for passenger cars, with the addition of a new automated cleaning mechanism.

Not far from the depot is the Dopolavoro Ferroviario, with a building used as a meeting place beside a football field. Also notable is the preserved steam engine of gruppo 625 monumentata.

== Passenger and train movements ==
The station has about 180,000 passenger movements each year.

Most regional trains calling at the station from Sibari/Croton terminate there. Trains operating between Reggio Calabria Centrale and Lamezia Terme Centrale are now required to reverse at Catanzaro Lido. Regional trains to and from Lamezia operate approximately hourly. The station also has direct express train connections with Roma Termini and Torino Porta Nuova.

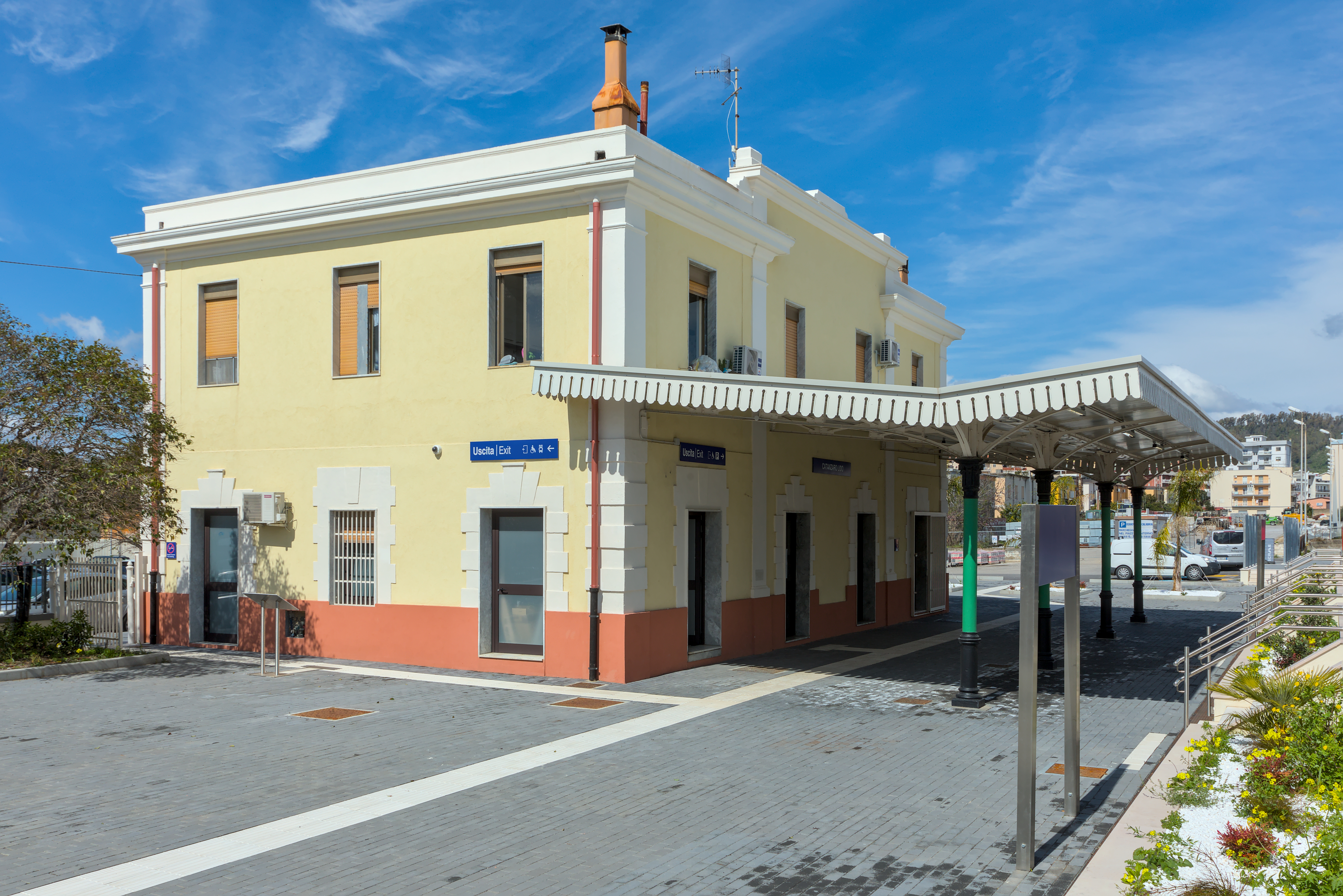
The Ferrovie della Calabria station building

A short walk from the station is the Catanzaro Lido (FC) station, from where the Catanzaro Città railway station can be reached, on the metre gauge Cosenza–Catanzaro Lido railway. From the latter station, there are connections to Gimigliano, Decollatura and Soveria Mannelli.

== Interchange ==
The station has a bus terminus for both urban and suburban buses.

=== Urban buses ===
- Line 30 Lido D circuit (Casciolino, Porto, Bivio Giovino, Via Crotone, Stazione FS, Aranceto, Bivio S.Maria, Via Conti Loritello, Rione Sala, Via Schipani, B.Gesù, Via Crispi, Via Indipendenza, Rione De Filippis, Lucrezia Della Valle, S.Maria Centro, Corvo, Stazione FS, Via Crotone, Bivio Giovino, Porto, Casciolino)
- Line 31 Lido S circuit (Porto, Bivio Giovino, Via Crotone, Stazione FS, Corvo, S.Maria, Lucrezia Della Valle, Rione De Filippis, Via Schipani, B.Gesù, Via Buccarelli, Via Indipendenza, Piazza Matteotti, Rione Sala, S.Maria, Aranceto, Stazione FS, Via Crotone, Bivio Giovino, Porto)

=== Interurban buses ===
- Autolinee Federico

Comuni of Monasterace, Locri, Guardavalle, Santa Caterina dello Ionio, Soverato, Bova Marina, Isca, Squillace, Roccelletta di Borgia.

- Autolinee Ferrovie della Calabria

Comuni of Soverato, Chiaravalle Centrale, Curinga, Girifalco, San Pietro a Maida, Borgia, Squillace, Cortale, Maida, Copanello, Stalettì, Montauro, Montepaone, Petrizzi, Gagliato, Petronà, Sersale.

- Autolinee Romano

Comuni of Crotone, Isola di Capo Rizzuto, Botricello, Sellia Marina.

== See also ==
- Catanzaro railway station
- History of rail transport in Italy
- List of railway stations in Calabria
- Rail transport in Italy
- Railway stations in Italy
