= Filippo De Nobili =

Italian writer

Filippo De Nobili (Catanzaro, 23 September 1875 – Catanzaro, 7 February 1962) was an Italian writer, poet, librarian, and historian. He was known for his opposition to fascism and the monarchy.

== Biography ==
Member of the De Nobili family of Catanzaro, he was the eldest son of Carlo De Nobili (1845–1908), baron of Magliacane, and of Concetta Pugliese. Filippo De Nobili was thus the great-grandson of the baron Carlo De Nobili (1777–1831), first mayor of Catanzaro, knight of Malta and well-known economist.

Filippo De Nobili studied law at the Sapienza University of Rome, where he met and became the disciple of the Marxist philosopher Antonio Labriola. De Nobili quickly became one of the three main leaders of the student movement in Rome, known as the goliardia romana, and also founded a movement supporting the abolition of monarchy. However, in July 1896, he was expelled from the university for leading a student's agitation, following the replacement of the Minister of Education Guido Baccelli, a left-wing politician, by Emanuele Gianturco, a moderate catholic. The Marxist philosopher Antonio Labriola tried to protect the students but a final verdict confirmed the expulsion of the three leaders, with the prohibition of attending any Italian university for two years.

Two years later, in 1898, Filippo De Nobili was allowed to continue his studies in law at the University of Messina, in Sicily. There he became a close friend of the decadent poet Giovanni Pascoli, before graduating and becoming a lawyer in Catanzaro.

From 1908 to 1958, De Nobili directed the Library Onestà e Lavoro of Catanzaro, a public library founded in 1889 and today called Municipal Library «Filippo De Nobili» in his memory. In 1910, the Library Onestà e Lavoro also merged with the Popular Library of Catanzaro. De Nobili joined the Associazione Italiana Biblioteche at its foundation in 1930, and was one of the first inspectors for public libraries of the region.

Filippo De Nobili was also a journalist, being the director of the newspaper U Spatrunatu and also the co-founder of the socialist journal Battaglia. He wrote articles and satirical pieces in various other political newspapers and magazines, sometimes with the pen name of Fideno. Finally, De Nobili was an expert of Calabrian linguistic and etymology, helping the German linguist Gerhard Rohlfs to produce one of the first bilingual dictionaries in Calabrian-Italian.

In August 1942, under fascism, Filippo De Nobili and Francesco Maruca clandestinely founded the Communist Federation of the Province of Catanzaro. Years later, the writer Corrado Alvaro wrote a poem titled Il topo e il falegname (The Mouse and the Carpenter) about the relationship between De Nobili and Maruca. De Nobili had met Corrado Alvaro when the latter was a high school student in Catanzaro.

De Nobili is remembered for his rebel attitude towards the monarchy and fascism. In 1934, he refused a prestigious decoration from the Crown, instead replying: "I would be grateful if, instead of this honour that I do not want, you would offer some financial support to my Library." Later, he publicly mocked Benito Mussolini during a visit of the latter to Catanzaro, mimicking the attitude of the dictator during his public appearances.

Throughout his life, Filippo De Nobili was successively socialist, communist, and perhaps anarchist at the end of his life. Disciple of the Marxist philosopher Antonio Labriola, he was also a close friend of the socialist Mario Casalinuovo and of the communist statesman Fausto Gullo. His thoughts and his political commitment influenced a whole generation of writers, politicians, and historians in Southern Italy.

== See also ==
- Copanello
