= Vitalian of Capua =

Saint Vitalian of Capua
- Born: Caudium
- Died: ~699 AD; Monte Vergine
- Venerated in: Roman Catholic Church
- Feast: 16 July (Catanzaro); 3 September
- Patronage: Catanzaro; Sparanise; San Vitaliano

Saint Vitalian(us) of Capua (Italian: San Vitaliano di Capua) was a 7th-century bishop of that city.

Both the Roman Martyrology (under 3 September) and the Martyrologium Hieronymianum state that Vitalian was a native of the ancient city of Caudium, which corresponds to today's Montesarchio, which lay on the Appian Way between Capua and Benevento. He is considered the 25th bishop of Capua, as well as a bishop of Benevento.

A legendary life of the saint written at the end of the 12th century, perhaps by a cleric of Benevento, states that he was involved in the establishment of a chapel on Monte Vergine, which later became an important site for the Williamites.

According to this legend, Vitalian was proclaimed bishop of Capua against his will. Almost immediately, he was accused by his enemies of various calumnies and sins. Vitalian attempted to defend himself, and then, after he had proven his innocence, left the city. Unfortunately, he was captured and tossed into the Garigliano in a bag of leather. According to church tradition, he was saved by divine intervention and made landfall at Ostia. Capua was punished meanwhile with famine and plague. The Capuans begged him to return, but Vitalian refused and withdrew to Mount Partenio (Monte Vergine), where he erected a sacred oratory dedicated to the Virgin Mary. He died in 699 AD.

== Veneration ==
Vitalian's cult spread across the Campania. Around 716 AD, his body was translated from Monte Vergine to Benevento under Bishop John (Giovanni) of Benevento, although some scholars state that it was moved around 914 AD due to Moorish incursions. In 1122, Pope Callistus II donated some of his relics to Catanzaro. He was sometimes confused with Vitalian of Osimo, causing identical feast days for both saints.

In 1311 Pietro Ruffo, Count of Catanzaro, built a chapel in the cathedral of the city that carried the saint's relics; it was rebuilt in 1583 by bishop Nicolò Orazio. The Calendario Marmoreo ("marble calendar") of Naples, built in the 9th century, lists this saint under 3 September.
