= Archdiocese of Capua =

Archdiocese in Campania, Italy

Coordinates: 41.1667°N 14.2833°E

Archdiocese of Capua Archidioecesis Capuana

Catholic
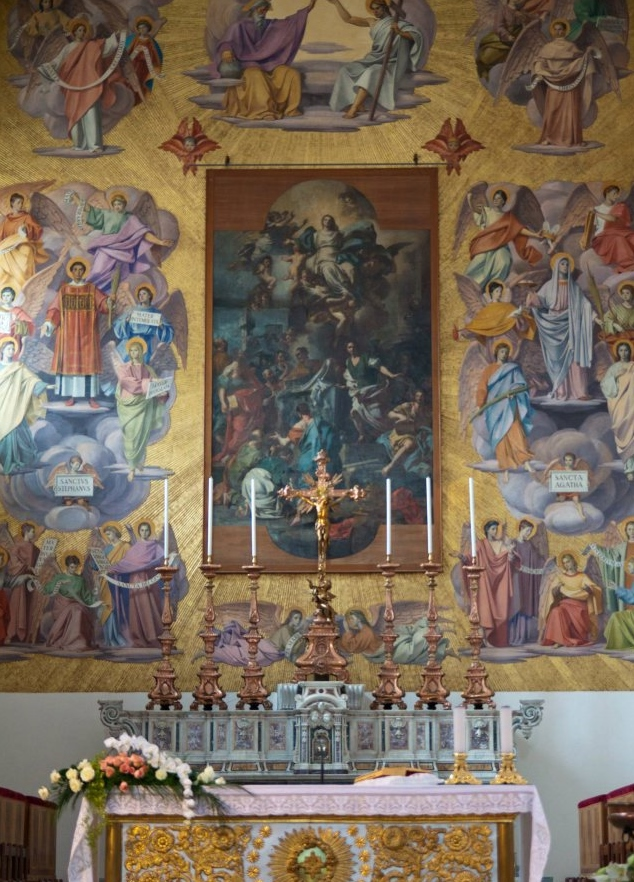

Location
- Country: Italy
- Ecclesiastical province: Naples

Statistics
- Area: 500 km^{2} (190 sq mi)
- Population: Total; Catholics: (as of 2016); 207,200 (est.); 196,200 (guess)
- Parishes: 60

Information
- Denomination: Catholic
- Sui iuris church: Latin Church
- Rite: Roman Rite
- Established: 2nd Century
- Cathedral: Basilica Cattedrale di Maria SS. Assunta in Cielo
- Secular priests: 77 (diocesan); 14 (Religious Orders)11 Permanent Deacons

Current leadership
- Pope: Leo XIV
- Archbishop: Salvatore Visco

Website
- diocesidicapua.it

The Archdiocese of Capua (Latin: Archidioecesis Capuana) is a Latin diocese of the Catholic Church in Capua, in Campania, Italy, but its archbishop no longer holds metropolitan rank and has no ecclesiastical province. Since 1979, it is a suffragan of the Archdiocese of Napoli, i.e. no longer has its own ecclesiastical province nor metropolitan status.

== History ==
According to the tradition, Christianity was first preached at Capua by St. Priscus, a disciple of St. Peter. In the martyrology mention is made of many Capuan martyrs, and it is probable that, owing to its position and importance, Capua received the Christian doctrine at a very early period.

The first bishop of whom there is positive record is Proterius (Protus), present at the Roman Council under Pope Melchiades in 313.

Bishop Memorius, who held a council to deal with the Schism of Antioch and the heresy of Bonosus, is often mentioned in the letters of St. Augustine and St. Paulinus, and was the father of the ardent Pelagian Julian of Eclanum.

In 841, during the bishopric of Paulinus, a band of Saracens destroyed Capua, and much of the population emigrated in a new town founded in another location. The episcopal see was moved there; later the old city, growing around the ancient basilica of Santa Maria Maggiore, was repopulated and called Santa Maria di Capua (current Santa Maria Capua Vetere). It is part of the current archdiocese of Capua. The first bishop of the diocese of Capua Nova ("New Capua") was Landulf (843–879).

In 968 pope John XIII took refuge in Capua, and in gratitude raised the see to archiepiscopal rank on 14 August 966. First archbishop was John (966–973).

On 24 December 1108, Pope Paschal II, who had been staying at Benevento for some months, visited Capua at the request of Abbot Bruno of Montecassino, and dedicated the renovated church of S. Benedict in Capua.

=== Cathedral and chapter ===
In the 13th century, the cathedral had more than fifty-two clerics called canonici. Archbishop Marino Filomarino (1252–1285) reduced the number to forty, ten priests, ten deacons, and twenty subdeacons. They were originally presided over by a dignity called the archpriest, though the name was later changed to fean. There was also an archdeacon. In 1698 there were four dignities (the dean, the archdeacon, and two primicerii)

=== Councils at Capua ===
In Lent 1087, an important conference of cardinals and bishops took place at Capua with Cardinal Desiderius, the abbot of Montecassino. A prominent part in the proceedings was taken by Cincius, the consul of Rome, Jordan Prince of Capua, and Duke Roger of Apulia and Calabria. On 24 May 1086, Desiderius had been the leading candidate in the papal election to succeed Pope Gregory VII, but he steadfastly refused the election. Finally he was prevailed upon to assume the papal mantle, but he had second thoughts and removed himself to Terracina. The conference at Capua put strong pressure on him to reassume the papal throne, and, on 21 March 1087, he relented. Finally he was crowned in Rome on 9 May 1087 as Pope Victor III.

On 7 April 1118, Pope Gelasius II, who had been forced to flee from Rome on 1 March, held a council in Capua; the Emperor Henry V, who had seized Rome, and the antipope Gregory VIII (Martin Burdinus, Bishop of Braga), who crowned him emperor, were excommunicated.

In 1569, Cardinal Niccolò Caetani di Sermoneta (1546–1585) presided over a provincial council in Capua. Archbishop Cesare Costa (1572–1602) held a provincial council on 2 November 1577. On 6–9 April 1603, Archbishop Robert Bellarmine (1602–1605) presided at a provincial council in Capua. The next provincial council took place in 1859, two hundred and fifty-six years after Bellarmine's council.

Cardinal Robert Bellarmine (1602–1605) held a diocesan synod in 1603. Cardinal Niccolò Caracciolo (1703–1728) held a diocesan synod in Capua on Pentecost Sunday, 1726.

=== Loss of metropolitan status ===
Following the Second Vatican Council, and in accordance with the norms laid out in the council's decree, Christus Dominus chapter 40, major changes were made in the ecclesiastical administrative structure of southern Italy. Wide consultations had taken place with the bishops and other prelates who would be affected. Action, however, was deferred, first by the death of Pope Paul VI on 6 August 1978, then the death of Pope John Paul I on 28 September 1978, and the election of Pope John Paul II on 16 October 1978. Pope John Paul II issued a decree, "Quamquam Ecclesia," on 30 April 1979, ordering the changes. Three ecclesiastical provinces were abolished entirely: those of Conza, Capua, and Sorrento. A new ecclesiastical province was created, to be called the Regio Campana, whose metropolitan was the archbishop of Naples. The dioceses formerly members of the suppressed Province of Capua (Gaeta, Calvi and Chieti, Caserta, and Sessa Arunca) became suffragans of Naples. The archbishop of Capua himself retained the title of archbishop, but the diocese became a suffragan of Naples.

== Bishops and archbishops ==
=== Bishops, to 966 ===
- Proterius (attested 313, 314)

...

- Vincentius (attested 342, 353, 372)

...
[Vitalianus]
[Pamphilus]
[Julianus]
[Symmachus]
[Rufinus]
...

- Priscus (443 Died)

...

- Tiburtius (465)

...

- Constantinus (attested 487–499)

...
[Alexander]
...

- Germanus (c.516–541)
- Victor (541–554)
- Priscus (555–560)

...

- Probinus (570–572)

...

- Festus (591–594)

...

- Basilius (attested 598–602)

...

- Gaudiosus (attested 649)

...

- Decorosus (attested 680)

...
Vitalianus (date unknown)

[Autchar] (date unknown)
...

- Theodorus (attested 743)

...
[Radipertus] (c. 830]
...

- Paulinus (835–843)

...

- Landulphus (attested 856–879)

...

- Landulphus

...

- Otho
- Ugo
- Petrus (attested 928)
- Sico (attested 942–944)
- Adelbertus (attested 949)
- Joannes (attested 965–974)

=== Archbishops, 966–1500 ===
- Joannes (965–966–974)
- Leo (974–978)
- Gerbertus (978–980)
- Atenulfus (981–990)
- Aio (991? 993?)
- Pandulfus
- Atenulfus
- Nicephorus (d. 1059)

...

- Otho (attested 1122)
- Flilppo
- Ugo
- Guilelmus
- Goffredus
- Alfano (1158–1183)
- Matthaeus (1183–1199)
- Rainaldus di Celano (1204 ? – ? )
- Rainaldus Gentile (1216–1222)

Sede vacante (1222–1225)

- Jacobus (1225–1242)

Gualterius da Ocre (1247–1249) (Archbishop-elect)

- Marino Filomarino (1252–1285)
- Cinthius de Pinea (1286–1290)
- Salimbene (1291–1297)
- Pietro Gerra (Pietro Guerra) (1298–1299)
- Leonardo Patrasso (1299–1300)
- Giovanni (1301–1304 Died)
- Andreas Pandone (1304–1311)
- Ingeramus Stella (1312–1333)
- Ricardus di Ruggiero (1334–1350)
- Vesianus, O.Min. (1350–1351)
- Giovanni della Porta (1353–1357)
- Reginaldus (1358–1363)

Philippus (1363)

- Stephanus della Sanità (1363–1380)
- Ludovico della Ratta (1380–1384) Avignon Obedience
- Giovanni di Pontecorvo (1384– ) Avignon Obedience
- Athanasius (c.1385−1406) Roman Obedience
- Filippo Barili (1406–1435) Roman Obedience
- Nicolò Acciapacci (1435–1447)
- Giordano Gaetano (1447–1496)
- Juan de Borja Lanzol de Romaní, el menor (1496–1498 Resigned)
- Juan López (1498–1501 Died)

=== Archbishops, 1500–1800 ===
- Giovanni Battista Ferrari (1501–1502)
- Cardinal Ippolito d'Este (I) (1502–1520) Administrator
- Nikolaus von Schönberg, O.P. (1520–1536 Resigned)
- Tommaso Caracciolo (1536–1546)
- Cardinal Niccolò Caetani di Sermoneta (1546–1549)
- Fabio Arcella (1549–1564)
- Niccolò Caetani di Sermoneta (1564–1585) [second appointment]
- Cesare Costa, C.O. (1572–1602 Died)
- Robert Bellarmine, S.J. (1602–1605 Resigned)
- Antonio Caetani (iuniore) (1605–1624)
- Luigi Caetani (1624–1627 Resigned)
- Girolamo Costanzo (1627–1633)
- Girolamo de Franchis (1634–1635)
- Camillo Melzi (1636–1659)
- Giovanni Antonio Melzi (1661–1687)
- Cardinal Gasparo Cavalieri (1687–1690 Died)
- Giacomo Cantelmo (1690–1691)
- Giuseppe Bologna (1691–1697 Died)
- Carlo Loffredo, C.R. (1698–1701 Died)
- Niccolò Caracciolo (1703–1728 Died)
- Mondilio Orsini, C.O. (1728–1743 Resigned)
- Giuseppe Maria Ruffo (1744–1754 Died)
- Muzio Gaeta (Jr.) (1754–1764 Died)
- Michele Maria Capece Galeota, C.R. (1764–1777 Resigned)
- Adelmo Gennaro Pignatelli di Belmonte, O.S.B. (1777–1785 Died)
- Agostino Gervasio, O.E.S.A. (1792–1806 Died)

=== Archbishops, since 1800 ===
- Baldassare Mormile, C.R. (1818–1826)
- Francesco Serra Cassano (1826–1850)
- Giuseppe Cosenza (1850–1863)
- Francesco Saverio Maria Apuzzo (1871–1880)
- Mariano Ricciardi (24 Nov 1871 – 23 Aug 1876 Died)
- Alfonso Capecelatro di Castelpagano, C.O. (1880–1912)
- Gennaro Cosenza (1913–1930 Retired)
- Salvatore Baccarini, C.R. (1930–1962 Died)
- Tommaso Leonetti (1962–1978 Retired)
- Luigi Diligenza (1978–1997 Retired)
- Bruno Schettino (1997–2012 Died)
- Salvatore Visco (2013–)

=== Current archbishop ===
On April 30, 2013, Bishop Salvatore Visco of Isernia-Venafro was appointed Archbishop of Capua by Pope Francis. Archbishop Visco was born in Naples on July 28, 1948. He completed his studies at the Major Seminary of Naples as a student at the Pontifical Theological Faculty of Southern Italy, in the section Saint Thomas (Capodimonte). He was ordained a priest on April 14, 1973. After ordination he was Parochial Vicar of Holy Mary. He served as a Professor of Religion in the public schools (1974-1994), and at the same time was Pastor of the Church of Mater Domini (1985-1993), Director of the Diocesan Liturgical Office (1985-1994), Episcopal Delegate for the Permanent Diaconate ministry program, and Diocesan Director for other Ministries (1985-1995). He was promoted vicar general of the Roman Catholic Diocese of Pozzuoli, and dean of the chapter of the cathedral (1994-2007). Appointed Bishop of the Roman Catholic Diocese of Isernia-Venafro on April 5, 2007, by Pope Benedict XVI, he was ordained a bishop on June 2, 2007. He is currently vice-president of the Episcopal Conference of Abruzzi - Molise.

== Notes and references ==
Attribution

== Books ==
=== Reference works ===
- Gams, Pius Bonifatius (1873). Series episcoporum Ecclesiae catholicae: quotquot innotuerunt a beato Petro apostolo. Ratisbon: Typis et Sumptibus Georgii Josephi Manz. p. 867-869. (Use with caution; obsolete)
- Eubel, Conradus, ed. (1913). Hierarchia catholica. Vol. Tomus 1 (second ed.). Münster: Libreria Regensbergiana. p. 467-468. (in Latin)
- Eubel, Conradus, ed. (1914). Hierarchia catholica. Vol. Tomus 2 (second ed.). Münster: Libreria Regensbergiana. p. 243. (in Latin)
- Eubel, Conradus; Gulik, Guilelmus, eds. (1923). Hierarchia catholica. Vol. Tomus 3 (second ed.). Münster: Libreria Regensbergiana. p. 305. (in Latin)
- Gauchat, Patritius (Patrice) (1935). Hierarchia catholica. Vol. IV (1592-1667). Münster: Libraria Regensbergiana. p. 324. (in Latin)
- Ritzler, Remigius; Sefrin, Pirminus (1952). Hierarchia catholica medii et recentis aevi V (1667-1730). Patavii: Messagero di S. Antonio. p. 365.
- Ritzler, Remigius; Sefrin, Pirminus (1958). Hierarchia catholica medii et recentis aevi. Vol. VI (1730-1799). Patavii: Messagero di S. Antonio. p. 388.
- Ritzler, Remigius; Sefrin, Pirminus (1968). Hierarchia Catholica medii et recentioris aevi (in Latin). Vol. VII (1800–1846). Monasterii: Libreria Regensburgiana.
- Remigius Ritzler; Pirminus Sefrin (1978). Hierarchia catholica Medii et recentioris aevi (in Latin). Vol. VIII (1846–1903). Il Messaggero di S. Antonio.
- Pięta, Zenon (2002). Hierarchia catholica medii et recentioris aevi (in Latin). Vol. IX (1903–1922). Padua: Messagero di San Antonio. ISBN 978-88-250-1000-8.

=== Studies ===
- Cappelletti, Giuseppe (1866). Le chiese d'Italia della loro origine sino ai nostri giorni (in Italian). Vol. vigesimo (20). Venezia: Giuseppe Antonelli. pp. 1–126.
- D'Avino, Vincenzo (1848). Cenni storici sulle chiese arcivescovili, vescovili, e prelatizie (nullius) del Regno delle Due Sicilie (in Italian). dalle stampe di Ranucci. pp. 631-633.
- Granata, Francesco (1766). Storia sacra della chiesa metropolitana di Capua (in Italian). Vol. Tomo primo. Napoli: Stamperia Simoniana. Granata, Francesco (1766). Tomo II.
- Jannelli, Gabriele (1872). Storia cronologica dei vescovi dell'antica Capua. Caserta 1872. (in Italian)
- Jannelli, Gabriele. Serie cronologica dei vescovi dell'antica Capua, Sicopoli, Capua nuova e Berolasi e degli arcivescovi capuani, Caserta 1872 (on the official diocesan website)
- Kamp, Norbert (2002), "The bishops of southern Italy in the Norman and Staufen Periods," in: Graham A. Loud and Alex Metcalfe (edd.), The society of Norman Italy (Leiden/Boston/Köln, 2002), pp. 185–209.
- Kehr, Paul Fridolin (1925). Italia pontificia Vol. VIII (Berlin: Weidmann 1925), pp. 200–237. (in Latin)
- Lanzoni, Francesco (1927). Le diocesi d'Italia dalle origini al principio del secolo VII (an. 604). Faenza: F. Lega, pp. 189–204. (in Italian)
- Ughelli, Ferdinando; Coleti, Niccolo (1720). Italia Sacra Sive De Episcopis Italiae (in Latin). Vol. Tomus sextus (6). Venezia: Coleti. pp. 291–366.
