= Bruno Schettino =

- Archbishop of Capua
- Church: Catholic Church
- Archdiocese: Archdiocese of Capua
- In office: 29 April 1997 – 21 September 2012
- Predecessor: Luigi Diligenza
- Successor: Salvatore Visco
- Previous post: Bishop of Teggiano-Policastro (1987-1997)

Orders
- Ordination: 28 June 1964 by Adolfo Binni
- Consecration: 4 April 1987 by Giuseppe Caprio

Personal details
- Born: 5 January 1941 Marigliano, Province of Naples, Kingdom of Italy
- Died: 21 September 2012 (aged 71) Capua, Campania, Italy

Bruno Schettino (5 January 1941 in Marigliano – 21 September 2012) was the Roman Catholic archbishop of the Roman Catholic Archdiocese of Capua, Italy.

Ordained to the priesthood in 1964, Schettino was made bishop in 1987 and died while in office.
