= Matthew (archbishop of Capua) =

Matthew (died 1199) was the Archbishop of Capua from 1183, when he succeeded Alfanus of Camerota. He supported the claim to the Sicilian kingdom of Constance and her husband, the Emperor Henry VI, against that of the reigning monarch, Tancred of Lecce. Under Henry, he became a royal advisor and imperial familiaris (courtier) at the court in Palermo. After the cities of Aversa and Capua briefly rebelled against Tancred in 1191, it was probably Matthew who persuaded them to surrender without a fight to Henry. In 1198 Constance placed the Jewry of Capua, thitherto under royal protection, under the protection of the archbishop as a reward for Matthew's loyalty. He was also praised by Henry's panegyrist, Peter of Eboli, in his Liber ad honorem Augusti ("Book Honouring the Emperor").
