= Catanzaro funicular =

Cable railway Calabria, Italy

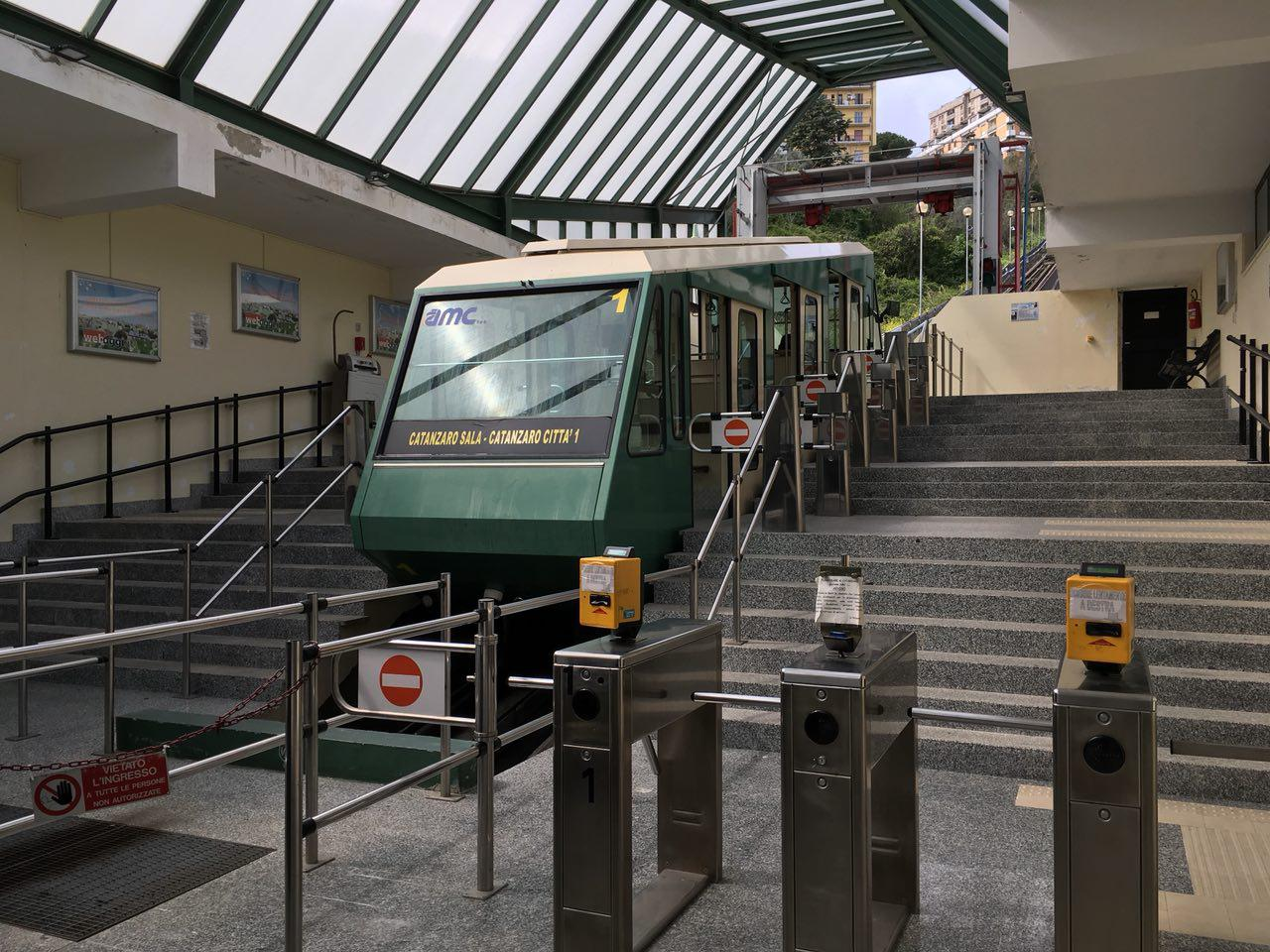
- Catanzaro Sala funicular station

Overview
- Status: Open
- Owner: City of Catanzaro
- Locale: Catanzaro, Calabria, Italy
- Coordinates: 38.901451°N 16.597679°E
- Termini: Piazza Roma; Catanzaro Sala
- Stations: 3

Service
- Type: Funicular
- Operator(s): Azienda per Mobilitatà della Città di Catanzaro

History
- Opened: 1998

Technical
- Line length: 678 m (2,224 ft)

The Catanzaro funicular (Italian: Funicolare di Catanzaro) is a funicular railway in the city of Catanzaro, Calabria, Italy. It connects the upper part of the city, at Piazza Roma, with Catanzaro Sala via an intermediate stop at Piano Casa. The line carries some 580,000 passengers per year.

The current line opened in 1998, using the trackbed and tunnel of the funicular section of the former Automotofunicolare di Catanzaro, a hybrid electric tramway and funicular that operated between 1910 and 1954. The reopened line was operated by the Ferrovie della Calabria, whose concession expired in 2014. The line closed in mid-2014 due to the poor condition of the infrastructure, and in November of that year, the city of Catanzaro issued a request to tender for an upgrade to the funicular. Work costing €0.5 million was undertaken to fit new surveillance, control and communications equipment, and the line reopened on 12 November 2016.

The funicular is owned by the city of Cantanzaro, and is now operated by the Azienda per Mobilitatà della Città di Catanzaro. It has the following technical parameters:

Number of stops	3 (2 termini; 1 intermediate)
Configuration	Single track with passing loop
Length	678 m (2,224 ft)
Height	158 m (518 ft)
Average steepness	28%
Number of cars	2
Capacity	70 passengers per car
Maximum speed	7 m/s (23 ft/s)
Trip time	130 seconds

== See also ==
- List of funicular railways
