= Luigi Diligenza =

- Archbishop of Capua
- Church: Roman Catholic Church
- See: Archdiocese of Capua
- In office: 1978–1997
- Predecessor: Tommaso Leonetti
- Successor: Bruno Schettino

Orders
- Ordination: 8 August 1943

Personal details
- Born: 10 February 1921 Arzano, Italy
- Died: 25 May 2011 (aged 90)

Luigi Diligenza (10 February 1921 – 25 May 2011) was an Italian prelate of the Roman Catholic Church.

== Biography ==
Diligenza was born in Arzano, Italy, and ordained a priest on 8 August 1943. He was appointed bishop of the Archdiocese of Capua on 1 March 1978 and ordained bishop on 23 April 1978. He retired from the diocese on 29 April 1997.

== See also ==
- Archdiocese of Capua
