= Florius of Camerota =

Florius of Camerota (Italian: Florio da [or di] Camerota) was a royal justiciar of the Kingdom of Sicily who worked an itinerant circuit throughout the Principality of Salerno, across different local jurisdictions, between 1150 and 1189. He hailed from Camerota in the Principality, and was a nephew of Alfanus, Archbishop of Capua. He was forced into a temporary exile in the Kingdom of Jerusalem (c. 1165), but the intervention of the pope restored him. He moved in the highest circles in the kingdom and in Europe, serving as a diplomat to the Kingdom of England in 1176.

In 1150, a court was held in the presence of King Roger II by Florius, fellow justiciar Lampus de Fasanella, and the chamberlain Atenulf in Salerno. Another court was held by the same officers in the same city, absent the king, in 1151. In 1158, in the castle of Capua, Florius and fellow justiciar Aimeric of Montemore adjudicated a complaint from the abbot of Santa Sofia of Benevento. Around 1166, at Aversa, Florius, with the justiciars Matthew de Venabulo and John de Valle, "performing the role of the lord king [in a] plenary and solemn court" (plenariam et sollempnem curia), restored two mills to the Diocese of Aversa. Around 1165, Florius fell from favour and was exiled to Jerusalem. This prompted Pope Alexander III to request King Louis VII of France to intervene on Florius' behalf with King William II of Sicily and, if this failed, with the Byzantine emperor Manuel II Comnenus.

By 1168, Florius, restored to favour, was administering a court at Messina, and had responsibility beyond his justiciarate, according to the court historian known by the pseudonym "Hugo Falcandus". Florius made only brief visits to his old justiciarate thereafter. In 1172, he and justiciar Lucas Guarna were in Salerno. In 1176, according to Romuald Guarna, Florius was sent to England to arrange a marriage between Joan, daughter of Henry II of England, and William II. In 1178, Florius and Lucas Guarna returned to Salerno and, with Eugenius of Palermo, presided over an inquiry into the murder of an abbot. By the 1180s, Florius was in charge of justice in Calabria. The length of his tenure as justiciar was "a force for continuity".
