= Alfanus of Camerota =

Alfanus of Camerota (Italian: Alfano di Camerota) was the Archbishop of Capua from 1158 until his death around 1180. He was a very close friend to Pope Alexander III.

In 1163, the Pope wrote Alfanus to inform him of a plot against King William I of Sicily. Alfanus passed the information on to his nephew, Florius of Camerota, the justiciar of the principality of Salerno, who in turn warned the king.

On 1 March 1174, the pope confirmed the metropolitan status of the see of Capua and confirmed its suffragans as Aquino, Caiazzo, Calvi, Carinola, Caserta, Isernia, Sessa, Teano, and Venafro: all the churches of the Campania.

In the autumn of 1176, Alfanus accompanied Richard Palmer and Robert of Caserta with twenty-five galleys to Saint-Gilles to take custody of Joan, daughter of Henry II of England, who was betrothed to William II. He was present at the wedding in Palermo on 18 February 1177.

It is not known when Alfanus died, but his successor, Matthew, is attested on 13 March 1183.

== Bibliography ==
- F. Chalandon. Histoire de la domination normande en Italie et en Sicilie 2. Paris: 1907.
- N. Cilento. "Alfano". Dizionario Biografico degli Italiani 2. Rome: 1960.
- G. A. Loud. "Royal control of the Church in the twelfth-century kingdom of Sicily". Studies in Church History 18 (1982), 147–59.
- P. Oldfield. City and Community in Norman Italy. Oxford: 2009.
