= Catanzaro =

Catanzaro Catanzaru (Sicilian)
- Comune
- Comune di Catanzaro
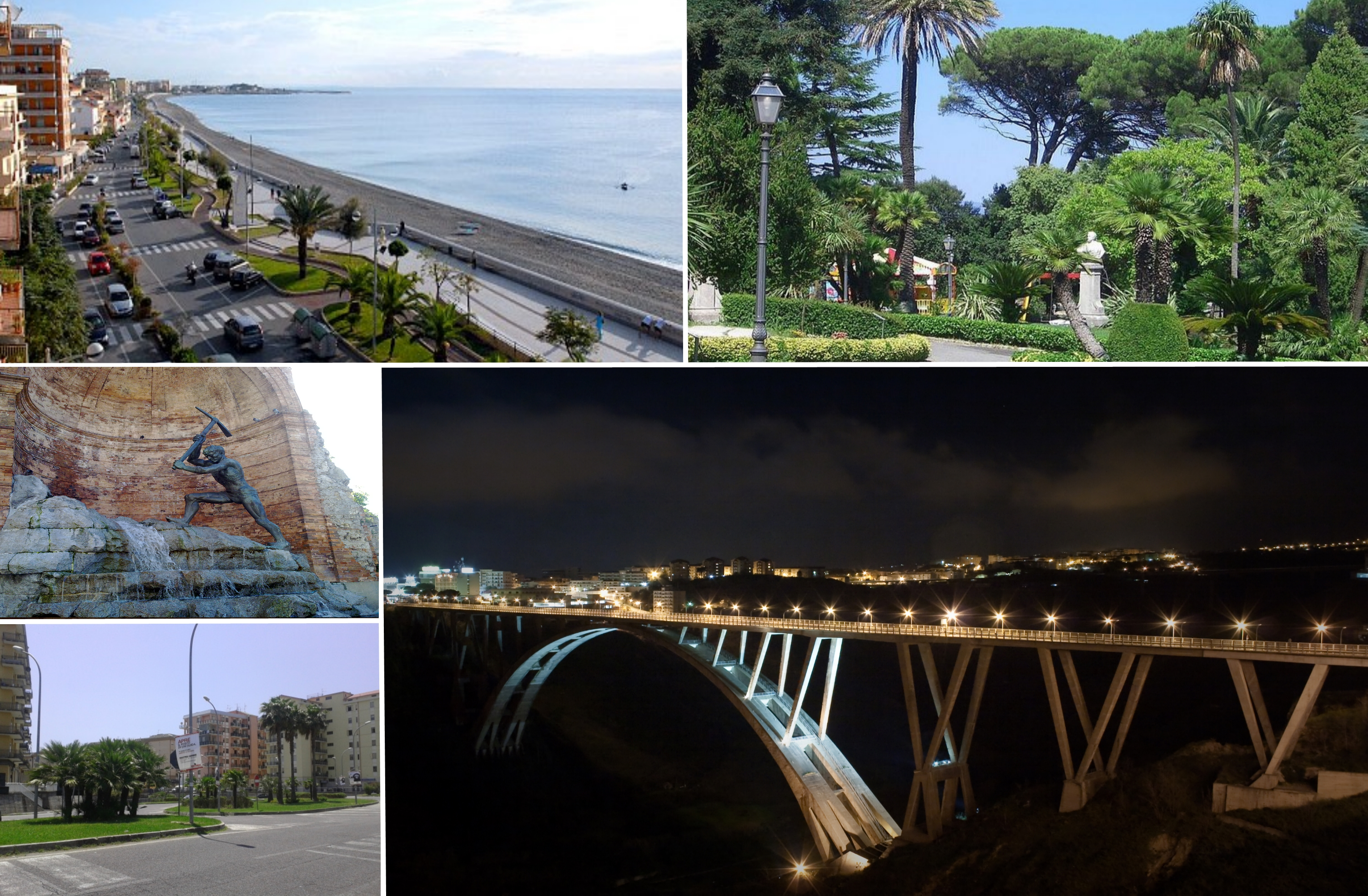

- Flag Coat of arms

- Location within Calabria Location within Italy Location within Europe
- Coordinates: 38°54′N 16°36′E
- Country: Italy
- Region: Calabria
- Province: Catanzaro (CZ)

Government
  - Mayor: Nicola Fiorita (PD)

Area
  - Total: 102.3 km^{2} (39.5 sq mi)
- Highest elevation: 342 m (1,122 ft)
- Lowest elevation: 0 m (0 ft)

Population (2020)
  - Total: 86,186
  - Density: 842.5/km^{2} (2,182/sq mi)
- Demonym: Catanzaresi
- Time zone: UTC+1 (CET)
  - Summer (DST): UTC+2 (CEST)
- Postal code: 88100
- Dialing code: 0961
- Patron saint: St. Vitalian of Capua and St. Agatius (co-patron)
- Saint day: 16 July
- Website: Official website

Catanzaro (US: /ˌkætænˈzæroʊ, -ntˈsær-/; Italian: [katanˈdzaːro] or [katanˈtsaːro]; Catanzarese: Catanzaru [katanˈtsaːɾʊ]), (Note: Ancient Greek: Κατανθέρος, romanized: Katanthéros, or Κατασταρίοι Λοκροί, Katastaríoi Lokrói; Medieval Greek: Καταντζάριον, romanized: Katantzárion; Latin: Chatacium or Catacium.) also known as the "City of the two Seas" (Italian: Città tra i due Mari), is an Italian city of 86,183 inhabitants (2020), the capital of the Calabria region and of its province and the second most populated comune of the region, behind Reggio Calabria.

The archbishop's seat was the capital of the province of Calabria Ultra for over 200 years. It houses the Magna Græcia University, the second-largest university in Calabria.

Catanzaro is an urban centre, with much activity, including some coastal towns, such as Sellia Marina and Soverato, and the municipalities of Silas, with a total of 156,196 inhabitants. Catanzaro is being consolidated to form a greater metropolitan area, by the Region of Calabria, and in connection with the town of Lamezia Terme, comprising 10 municipalities. This will lead to the creation of an integrated area involving over 200,000 inhabitants.

During the summer months, the Ionian coast from Catanzaro to Soverato is an important tourist attraction, especially for the youth, and several important structures are located in the coastal districts of the city and in the towns of Copanello and Soverato.

Catanzaro is also known as the city of the three V's, referring to the three distinct features of the city, namely Saint Vitalian, the patron saint; velvet, because the city has been an important silk centre since Byzantine times; and wind (vento in Italian), because of the strong breezes from the Ionian Sea and La Sila.

"VVV" was the symbol by which Catanzaro's silk industry was known, identified for both its domestic and foreign markets, and iconic for the finest fabrication of silks, velvets, damasks, and brocades from the city.

== Geography ==
Catanzaro overlooks the Gulf of Squillace, in the Ionian Sea. The district of Catanzaro stretches from the sea to an elevation of 600 metres (2,000 ft). The historic center is approximately 300 metres (980 ft) above sea level. The town dates back to the valley of Fiumarella (formerly known as River Zaro). The Bishopric, St. Tryphon (or San Rocco) and St. John (or castle) marks the city's historical centre and is connected to the North Sila. Due to its particular geography, the municipality gets wet from the sea and is still subjected to a snowy winter. Catanzaro's rivers include the mainstream of the Fiumarella (in local dialect Hjiumareddha), which joins with the river Musofalo, and the torrent Corach (formerly called Crotalo).

=== Climate ===
According to the Köppen climate classification, Catanzaro experiences a hot-summer Mediterranean climate (Csa), characterized by a windy spring and autumn.

According to the 30-year average of 1961–90 reference, the average temperature of the coldest month, January, came to 8.9 °C (48 °F). The hottest month, August, is 24.5 °C (76 °F).

The climate, as mentioned, is marked by the presence of wind, even high intensity, especially during spring and autumn. The annual average intensity is about 4 knots (4.6 mph) with peaks at 6 knots (6.9 mph). The months of April and May are characterized by strong winds and the "scirocco libeccio".

The annual rainfall is around 1,000 millimetres (39 in), distributed in 87 days on average, with a long summer and a maximum peak in the autumn and winter.

Climate data for Catanzaro (1981–2010)
Month	Jan	Feb	Mar	Apr	May	Jun	Jul	Aug	Sep	Oct	Nov	Dec	Year
Mean daily maximum °C (°F)	11.6 (52.9)	11.7 (53.1)	13.8 (56.8)	16.7 (62.1)	21.3 (70.3)	25.8 (78.4)	28.7 (83.7)	29.1 (84.4)	25.3 (77.5)	21.3 (70.3)	16.3 (61.3)	12.6 (54.7)	19.5 (67.1)
Daily mean °C (°F)	9.1 (48.4)	8.9 (48.0)	10.8 (51.4)	13.5 (56.3)	17.7 (63.9)	22.0 (71.6)	24.9 (76.8)	25.4 (77.7)	21.8 (71.2)	18.2 (64.8)	13.6 (56.5)	10.2 (50.4)	16.3 (61.4)
Mean daily minimum °C (°F)	6.6 (43.9)	6.1 (43.0)	7.7 (45.9)	10.2 (50.4)	14.1 (57.4)	18.2 (64.8)	21.0 (69.8)	21.6 (70.9)	18.3 (64.9)	15.1 (59.2)	10.9 (51.6)	7.8 (46.0)	13.1 (55.7)
Average precipitation mm (inches)	111 (4.4)	103 (4.1)	103 (4.1)	68 (2.7)	38 (1.5)	19 (0.7)	20 (0.8)	28 (1.1)	75 (3.0)	87 (3.4)	130 (5.1)	152 (6.0)	934 (36.9)
Average precipitation days (≥ 1.0 mm)	11	10	9	8	6	3	2	3	6	8	11	11	88
Source 1: Istituto Superiore per la Protezione e la Ricerca Ambientale
Source 2: Climi e viaggi (precipitation days)

== History ==
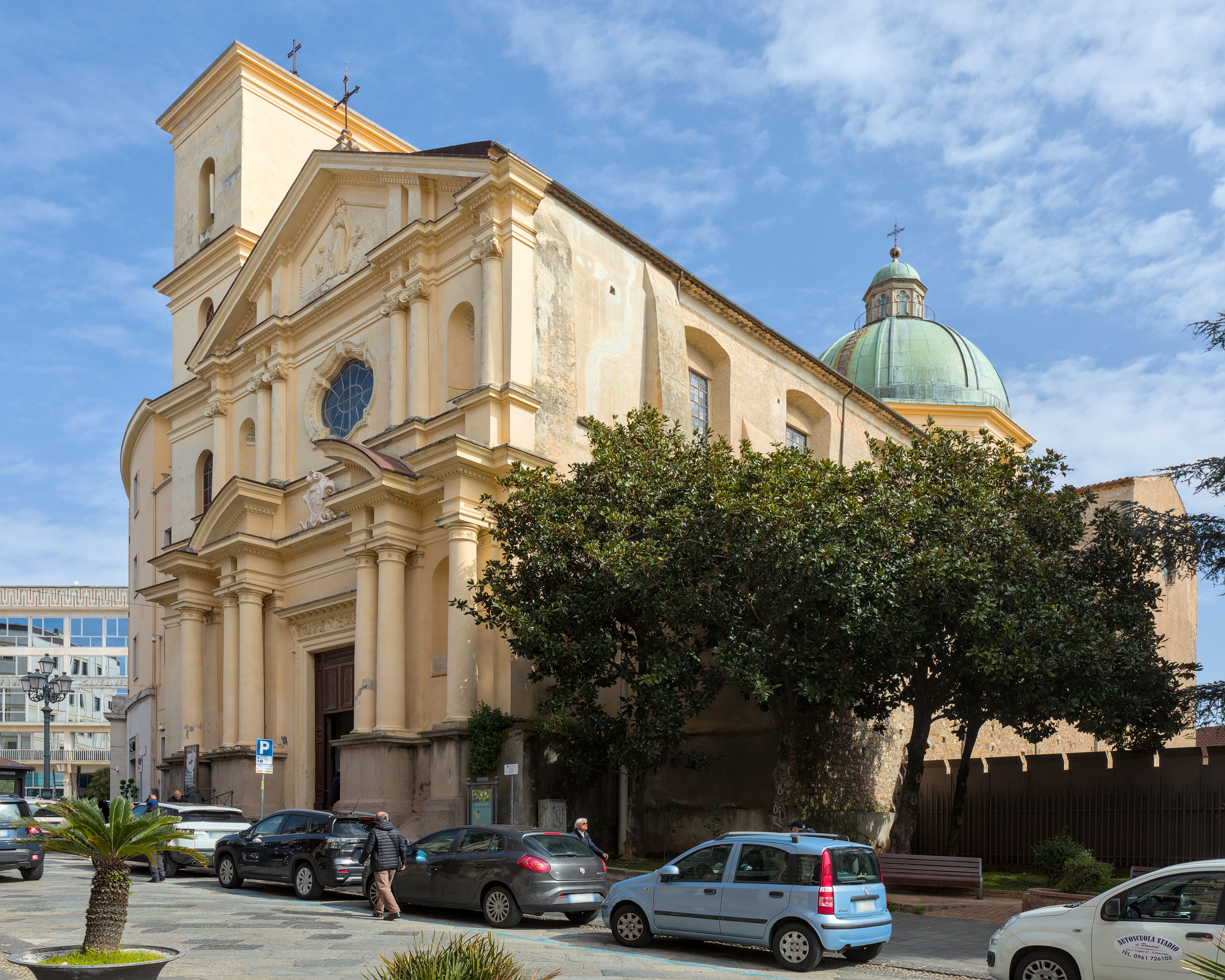
Basilica dell'Immacolata

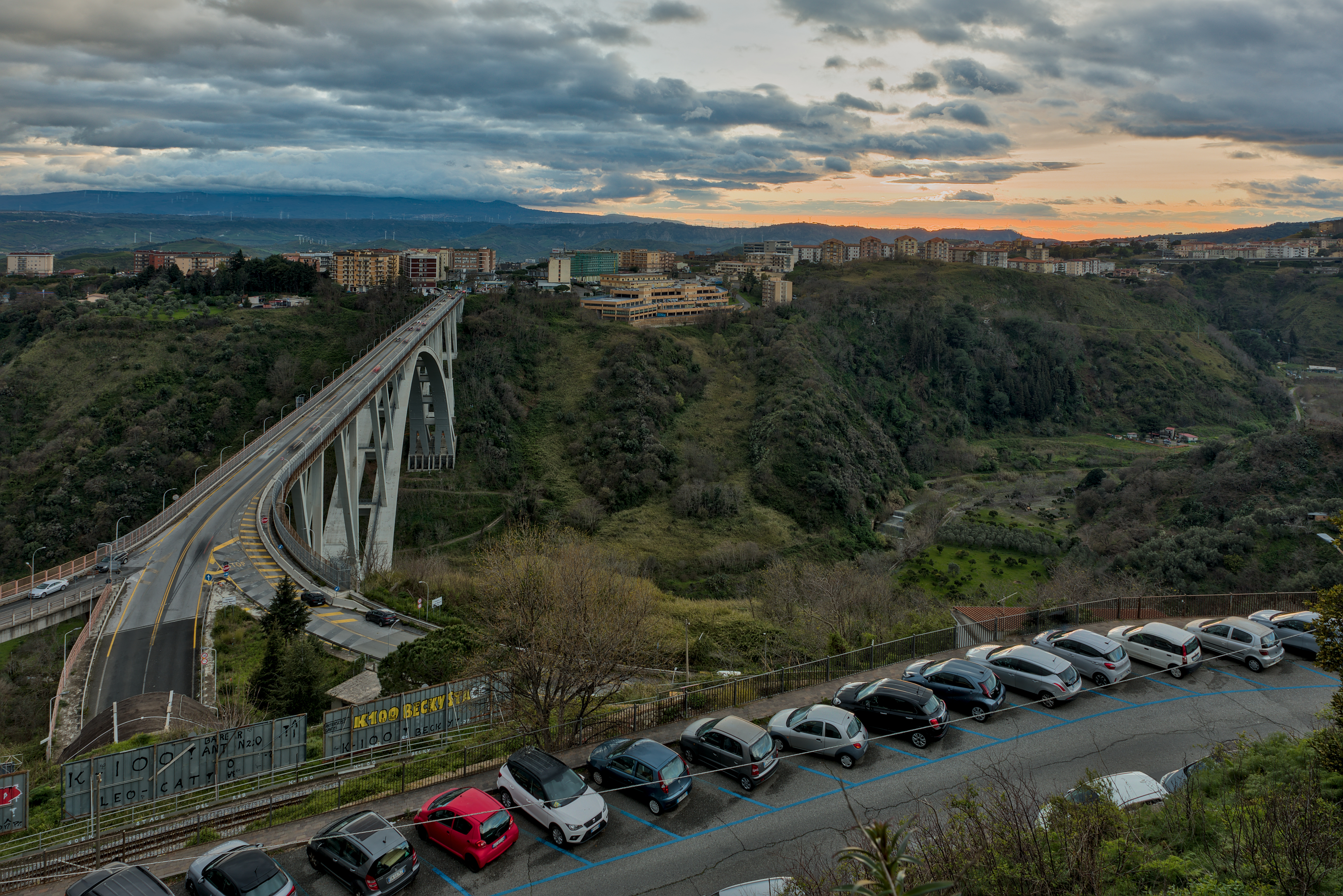
View from the old town of Catanzaro at sunset

Certain assumptions trace the origin of Catanzaro to an ancient Greek colony, already in place, which became the land of Scolacium, believed to have been built on the ruins of the ancient city of Trischines. Other sources identify Catanzaro's development to have grown from various settlements scattered in the area of Catanzaro, Marina, Tiriolo (formerly Teure), Santa Maria di Catanzaro, and on the hill Trivonà (Trischines, along the valley of Corach which formed the old "Land of Feaco"). The mouth of the river, according to legend, created the ancient Ulysses Skilletion.

In the district of Germaneto along the valley of Corach, a Greek necropolis of the fifth century BC and an ancient Roman settlement were found. Archaeological discoveries show that the municipality was active since the Iron Age, flourishing with the populations of Vitulo, so-called because they worship the statue of the calf (Latin: vitulus), which the Greeks renamed Italoi ("worshipers of the calf"), and governed by the Italian king of the same name, brother of Dardanus and ancestor of the Trojans. Italy itself gets its name from this figure.

According to another legend, Catanzaro was named after two Byzantine generals Cattaro and Zaro who led the coastal city of Magna Graecia Skilletion or Skillakion, corresponding to the Roman Scolacium (near Catanzaro's Marina), first on Zarapotamo (today Santa Maria di Catanzaro) and then later on Trivonà, a military fortress.

Catanzaro was always choice land due to its safe, high location, and the territory was under several groups' control, including the Saracens, Normans, Catalans and Venetians. The Saracens were the first to push the town's development to its highest regions by the second half of the ninth century. Byzantine general Nikephoros Phokas was responsible for the naming of the "Rock of Niceforo". Catanzaro's development into a fortress town was established by General Flagizio, who began the construction of a citadel, which later assumed the name of Katantzárion. According to some assumptions, the name is inspired from the development of workshops for creating silk, what the Greeks call Katartárioi (Καταρτάριοι, "spinners of silk").

At the beginning of the tenth century (circa 903), the Byzantine city was occupied by the Saracens, who founded an emirate and took the Arab name of قطنصار Qaṭanṣār. An Arab presence is evidenced by findings at an eighth-century necropolis which had items with Arabic inscriptions.

Around the year 1050, Catanzaro rebelled against Saracen dominance and returned to a brief period of Byzantine control. In 1069, Catanzaro was the last city in Calabria, after many months of resistance, to fall under siege by the Normans of Robert Guiscard, who built the Norman castle, still in existence today. During this era, arts and crafts pioneered, and particularly the processing of silk, which was traded with other regions in Italy, other countries and Eastern Europe.

Between the 9th and the 11th century, Catanzaro was the first centre to introduce silk production to Italy. The silk of Catanzaro supplied almost all of Europe and was sold in a large market fair to Spanish, Venetian, Genoese and Dutch merchants. Catanzaro became the lace capital of Europe with a large silkworm breeding facility that produced all the laces and linens used in the Vatican. The city was world-famous for its fine fabrication of silks, velvets, damasks and brocades.

While the cultivation of mulberry was moving first steps in Northern Italy, silk made in Calabria reached a peak of 50% of the whole Italian/European production. As the cultivation of mulberry was difficult in Northern and Continental Europe, merchants and operators used to purchase in Calabria raw materials in order to finish the products and resell them for a better price. The Genoese silk artisans used fine Calabrian silk for the production of velvets.

In the 13th century, Emperor Frederick II made Catanzaro a direct possession of the crown. Later the city was the household feud of the Ruffo, Caraffa and Soriano families. The Normans elevated Catanzaro into a noble county, giving it to Peter Ruffo. The latter was lost in a struggle against Manfred of Sicily, but he later returned to the city, when Charles I of Anjou signed the peace of the War of the Vespers. For fourteen years, it was the royal domain of King Ladislaus of Naples, and in 1420 it was returned again to Nicholas Ruffo, who gave it as part of a dowry for his daughter Enrichetta who was married to Antonio Centelles. After a rebellion by the rural people, King Alfonso V of Aragon took control of the city. In 1460 there was a war with the partisans of Centelles. When peace returned, the city was granted new privileges which greatly promoted the development of its silk industry, for which its damasks were known throughout Europe. From this time forward, Catanzaro firmly established itself as an import center for its textile productions.

In the 15th century, Catanzaro was exporting both its silk cloth and its technical skills to neighbouring Sicily. By the middle of the century, silk spinning was taking place in Catanzaro, on a large scale.

In 1466, King Louis XI decided to develop a national silk industry in Lyon and called a large number of Italian workers, mainly from Calabria. The fame of the master silk weavers of Catanzaro spread throughout France and they were invited to Lyon in order to teach the techniques of weaving. In 1470, one of these weavers, known as Jean le Calabrais, invented the first prototype of a Jacquard-type loom. He introduced a new kind of machine which was able to work the yarns faster and more precisely. Over the years, improvements to the loom were ongoing.

In 1519 Emperor Charles V formally recognized the growth of the industry of Catanzaro by allowing the city to establish a consulate of the silk craft, charged with regulating and check in the various stages of a production that flourished throughout the sixteenth century. At the moment of the creation of its guild, the city declared that it had over 500 looms. By 1660, when the town had about 16,000 inhabitants, its silk industry kept 1,000 looms, and at least 5,000 people, busy. The silk textiles of Catanzaro were not only sold at the kingdom's markets, they were also exported to Venice, France, Spain and England.

In 1528 Charles V gave authorization for Catanzaro to bear the imperial eagle attached to a coat of arms depicting the hilltops of the town.

On 23 December 1961, at the Fiumarella viaduct near Catanzaro, there was a serious rail accident, when a train derailed and fell about 40 metres (131 ft) into the river below. Seventy-one passengers lost their lives on impact, and 28 others were injured to varying degrees.

In 1970 Catanzaro was designated to be the capital of Calabria.

== Historical names ==
Catanzaro had different names, which correspond to different periods of history through the city:

- Καταντζάριον, Katantzárion, a Greek settlement
- Chatacium, during Roman times
- قَطَنْصَار, Qaṭanṣār, Saracen period (903–1050 approximately)
- "Rock of Niceforo", Byzantine period
- Cathacem, Norman period
- Cathanzario, under the Kingdom of Naples
- Catanzaro, under united Italy

== Main sights ==
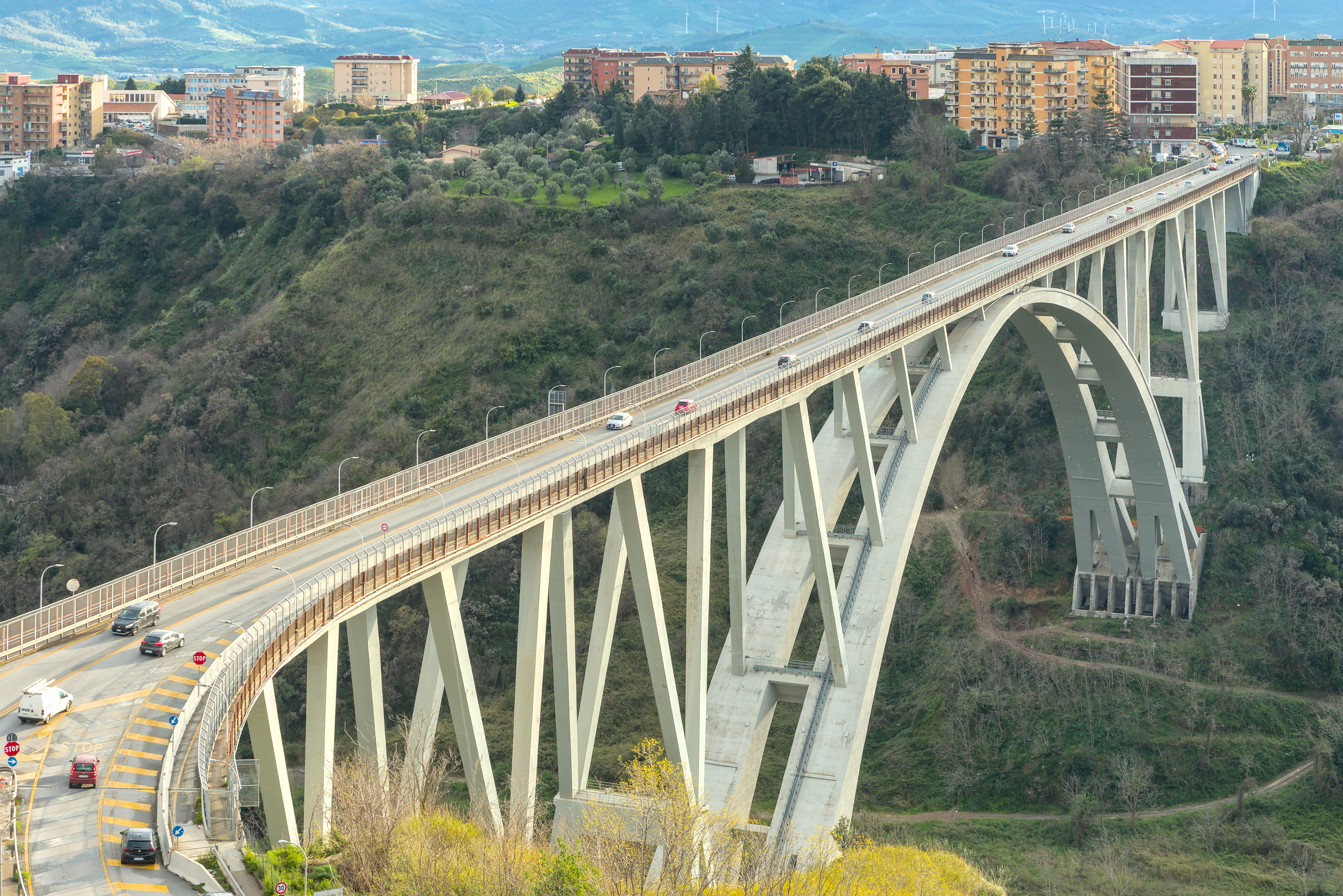
Morandi-Bisantis viaduct

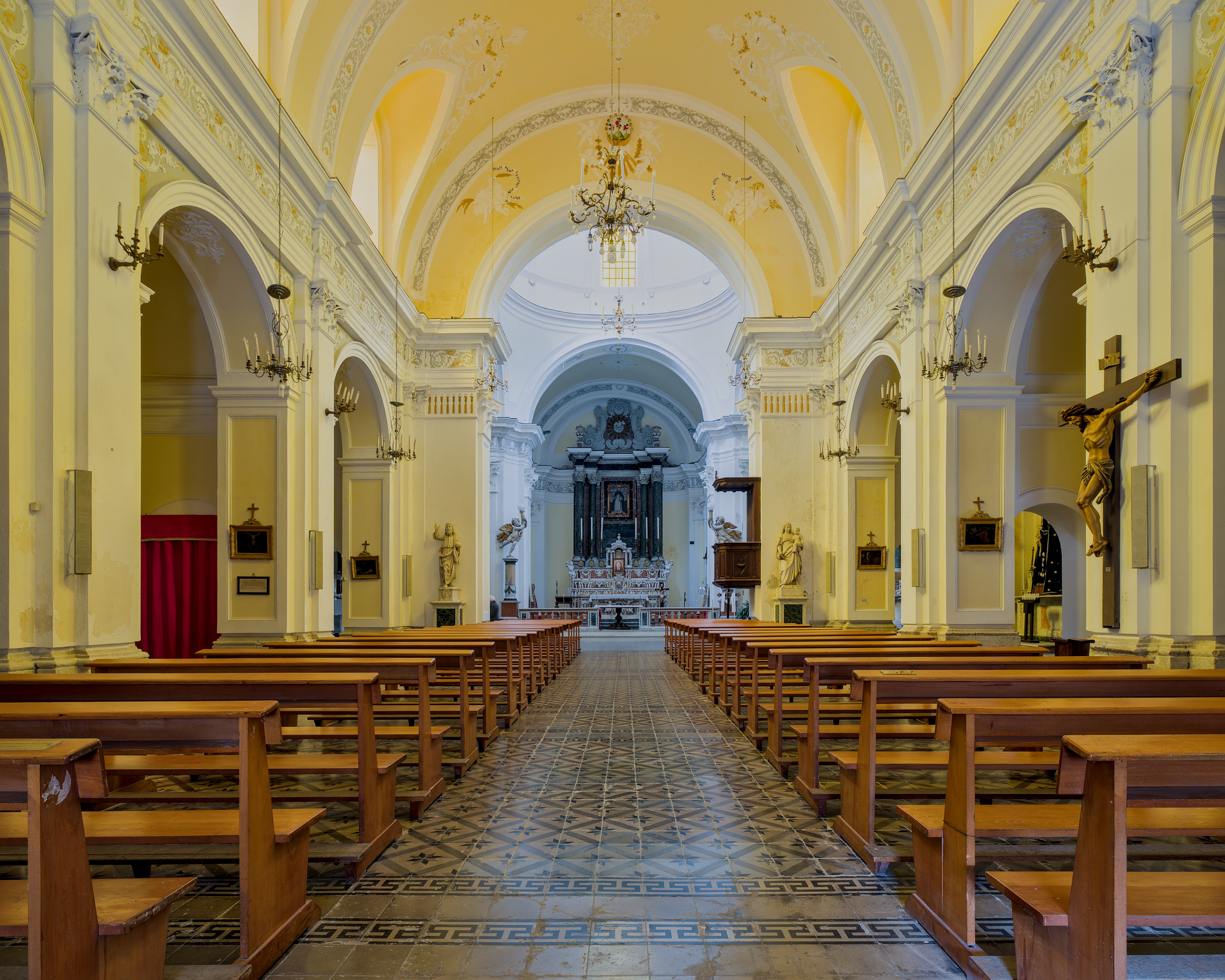
Interior of the church of the Santissimo Rosario

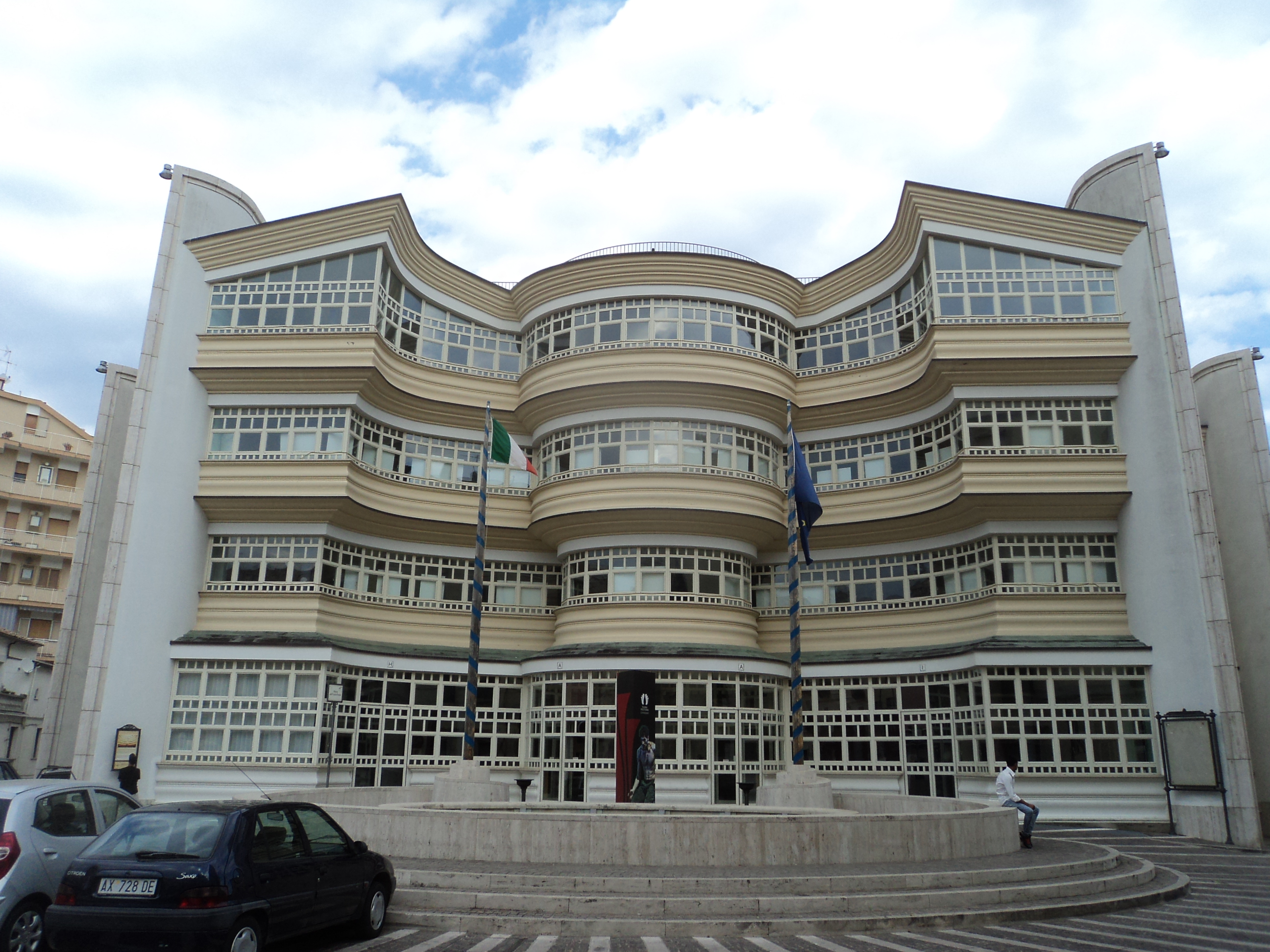
Politeama Theatre

- Catanzaro Bridge, a well-known, one-arch bridge (Viaduct Morandi-Bisantis), one of the tallest in Europe.
- Duomo (Cathedral). Built over a Norman cathedral built in 1121, in the 16th century it received a Renaissance façade which was however destroyed in 1638. The church was almost entirely destroyed by the bombings of 1943, and was later rebuilt.
- Basilica dell'Immacolata.
- Church of the Santissimo Rosario (15th or 16th century), with a Renaissance façade and a single nave interior. The church of the Santissimo Rosario houses silk fabrics made between 1500 and 1800, including the Pianeta of the Borgia, a sacred vestment ordered by Pope Alexander VI on the occasion of the wedding between Goffredo Borgia and Donna Sancia D'Aragona, who became Princess of Squillace.
- Church of Sant'Omobono (11th or 12th century).
- Byzantine small church of Sant'Omobono (11th century).
- Chiesa dell'Osservanza, or Santa Teresa. In the interior is the 16th century Chapel of the Holy Sepulchre and a statue of "Madonna delle Grazie" by Antonello Gagini.
- Remains of the Norman Castle.
- Porta di S. Agostino and Porta di Stratò, two gates of which are the last remains of the medieval walls, demolished in 1805.
- Palazzo de' Nobili (15th century), now Town Hall.
- Piazza Grimaldi, a town square named in honour of the House of Grimaldi, who had branches that traded heavily within Catanzaro.
- Politeama Theatre.

== Population ==
Historical population

Year	Pop.	±%
1861	22,378	—
1871	24,226	+8.3%
1881	27,814	+14.8%
1901	32,005	+15.1%
1911	34,103	+6.6%
1921	35,623	+4.5%
1931	40,533	+13.8%
1936	45,400	+12.0%

Year	Pop.	±%
1951	59,969	+32.1%
1961	74,037	+23.5%
1971	86,284	+16.5%
1981	100,832	+16.9%
1991	96,614	−4.2%
2001	95,251	−1.4%
2011	89,364	−6.2%
2021	85,609	−4.2%

Source: ISTAT

== Economy ==
Catanzaro's current economy is mostly based on tertiary and services. Industries are mostly medium and small-size companies working within a local market.

== Transportation ==
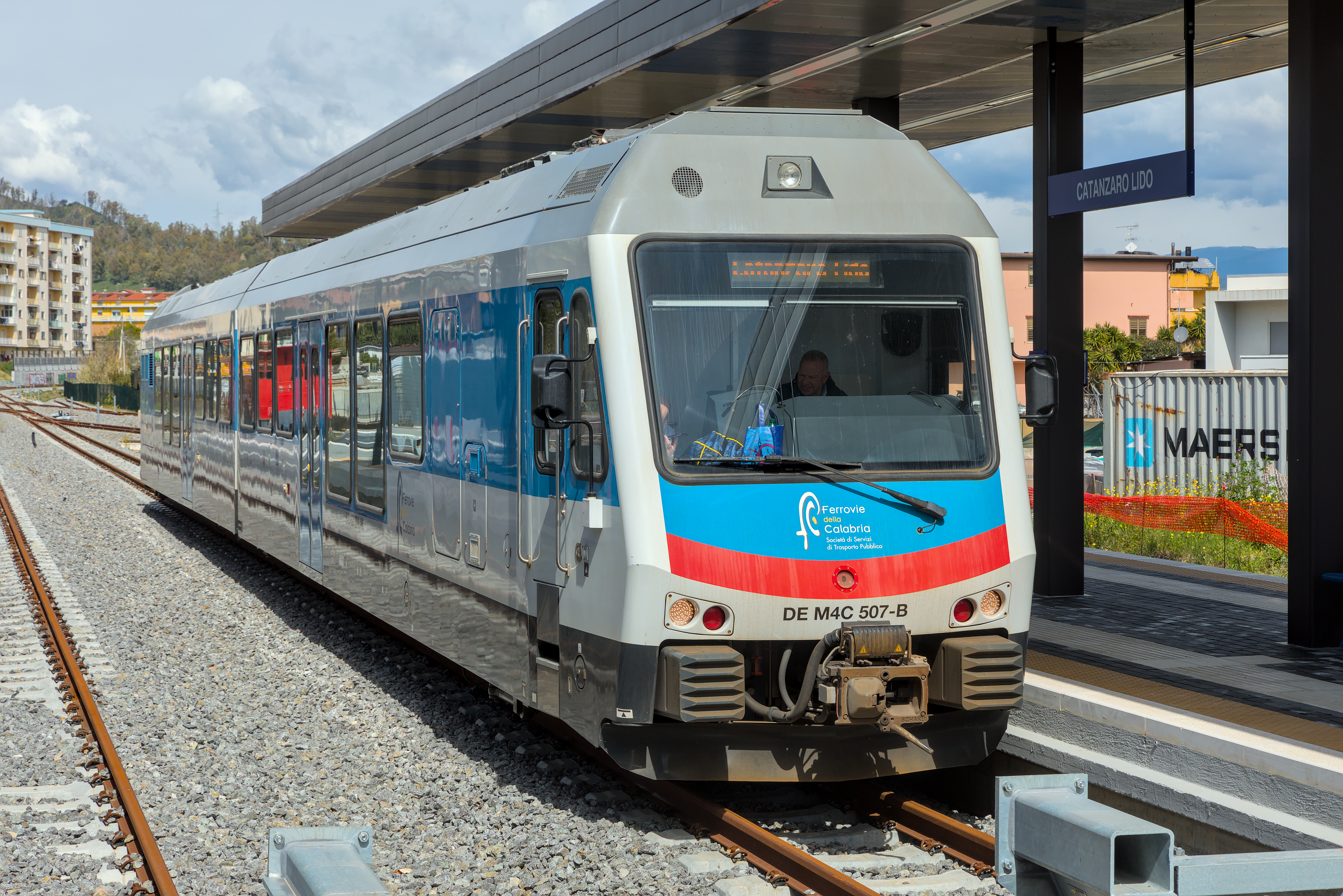
A Ferrovie della Calabria train at the Catanzaro Lido station

Catanzaro is served by the SS106 Jonica ("Ionian") state road which connects it to the A2 motorway.

In the city centre is a line with three stations. A metropolitan service (with c. 1,600,000 users per year, with 20 trains working) is provided by Ferrovie della Calabria, with a total of 11 railway stations in the city, plus others in 12 comuni of the hinterland. The rest of the public transportation system is based on 49 bus lines of AMC (Azienda per la Mobilità Catanzaro). The city has two main railway stations: Catanzaro and Catanzaro Lido.

In 2026, Metropolitano di Catanzaro started operating on the narrow-gauge (950 mm) former Catanzaro Lido-Cosenza railway, connecting the historic city centre to the coastal Catanzaro Lido. Another section, connecting Catanzaro-Sala to the railway station at Catanzaro Germaneto is under construction.

The nearest airport is Lamezia Terme International Airport, located 35 km (22 mi) west of Catanzaro.

== Sports ==
Serie B club U.S. Catanzaro 1929 represents the city of Catanzaro in association football. They play their home fixtures at the Stadio Nicola Ceravolo.

== Notable people ==
- Renato Dulbecco: Nobel Prize winner.
- Mimmo Rotella: contemporary artist and inventor of the Décollage.
- Filippo De Nobili: writer, poet, librarian, historian anti-fascist and anti-monarchist.

== Twin town ==
- Taksony, Hungary

== See also ==
- Fatti di Reggio
- Copanello
