= Magna Græcia University =

Italian university

Coordinates: 38°52′03″N 16°34′23″E

Magna Græcia University of Catanzaro
- Università degli Studi Magna Græcia di Catanzaro
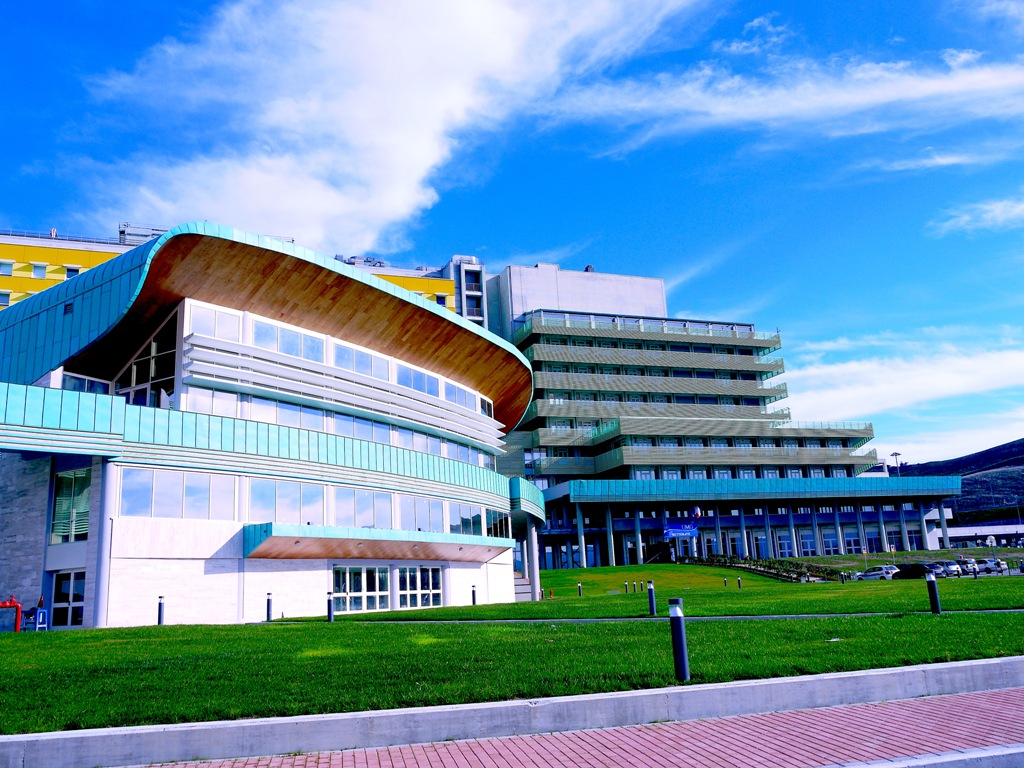
- Magna Græcia University of Catanzaro
- Motto: Dubium sapientiae initium (Latin)
- Type: Public
- Established: 1998
- Rector: Giovanni Cuda
- Location: Catanzaro, Italy
- Website: www.unicz.it

The Magna Græcia University of Catanzaro (Italian: Università degli Studi Magna Græcia di Catanzaro; abbreviated UniCz) is a university located in Catanzaro, Italy. It was founded in 1998 and is organized in three faculties.

== History ==
=== The consortia and the Free University (1967–1981) ===
The "P. Galluppi" National Boarding School, a 16th-century building and the first historic seat of Catanzaro University Studies.

On 6 December 1967, the Consortium for the University of Reggio Calabria was established, which would soon form a partnership with the equivalent consortium in Catanzaro to launch university studies in the two cities.

=== Former Odeon Cinema, used as a classroom by University Consortia ===
In 1972, the Free University of Catanzaro was founded. This institution was promoted by the consortium of the same name, consisting of the Chamber of Commerce, Industry, Crafts and Agriculture, the Provincial Industrialists' Association, the Provincial Traders' Union, the Provincial Federation of Direct Farmers, the Unione cultural club, and the Notarial College of the united districts of Catanzaro and Crotone. The creation of this university institute was intended to serve the purpose of the legal establishment by the State of an autonomous university. The enrollment in the first academic year 1972/73 was approximately five hundred, and doubled in the second year. It included the faculties of law, education, and political science. The autonomous intent of the Free University of Catanzaro did not meet with the hoped-for success, and so it had to cease its activities in 1976, resulting in hardship for the approximately one thousand students at the time.

On January 18, 1979, a prefectural decree established the Consortium for the Promotion of Culture and University Studies in Catanzaro, aimed at establishing university campuses in the area. Palazzo Bitonti on Via San Brunone di Colonia was chosen as the consortium's headquarters. The project's promoter, along with Professor and journalist Libero Greco and many others, was Salvatore Blasco, magistrate and president of the Catanzaro Court, after whom a classroom in the Law, Economics, and Social Sciences building is named. In those years, the courses in medicine (decentralised branch of the then Second Faculty of Medicine and Surgery of the University of Naples) and law (decentralised branch of the Messina faculty of the same name) were started, which were held in the Odeon cinema hall in the gardens of San Leonardo.

== Organization ==
The three faculties are:

- Faculty of Law
- Faculty of Medicine and Surgery
- Faculty of Pharmacy

== See also ==
- List of Italian universities
- Catanzaro
