= Brindisi railway station =

Railway station in Brindisi, Italy

Brindisi
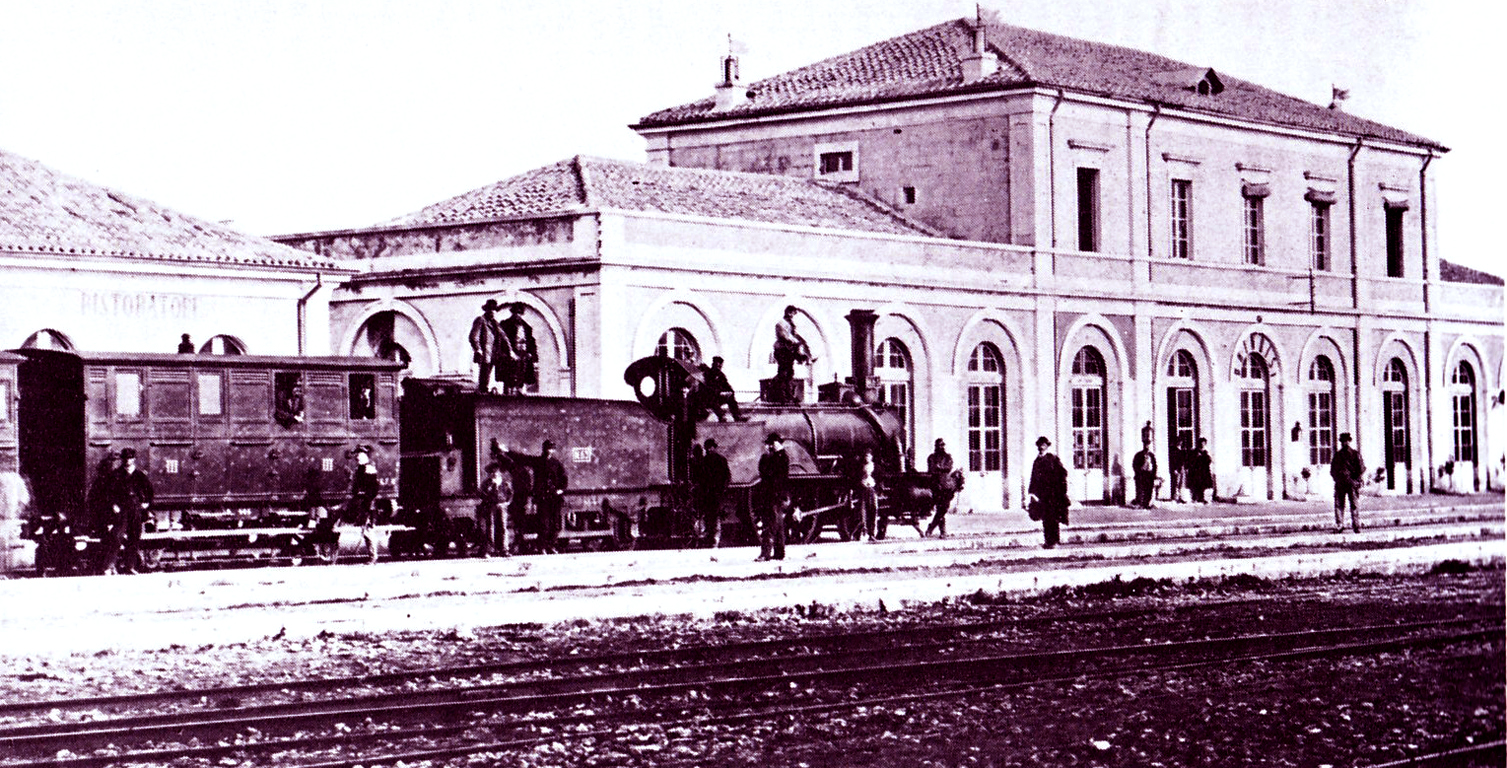
- The station in 1870.

General information
- Location: Piazza Francesco Crispi; 72100 Brindisi BR; Brindisi, Brindisi, Apulia; Italy
- Coordinates: 40°38′04″N 17°56′20″E
- Operator: Rete Ferroviaria Italiana; Centostazioni
- Lines: Ancona–Lecce; Taranto–Brindisi
- Distance: 759.539 km (471.956 mi) from Bologna Centrale; 69.169 km (42.980 mi) from Taranto
- Platforms: 8
- Train operators: Trenitalia
- Connections: Bus to Brindisi – Salento Airport; Urban and suburban buses

Other information
- IATA code: BQD
- Classification: Gold

History
- Opened: 29 April 1865; 161 years ago
Location
- Location within Apulia Location within Italy

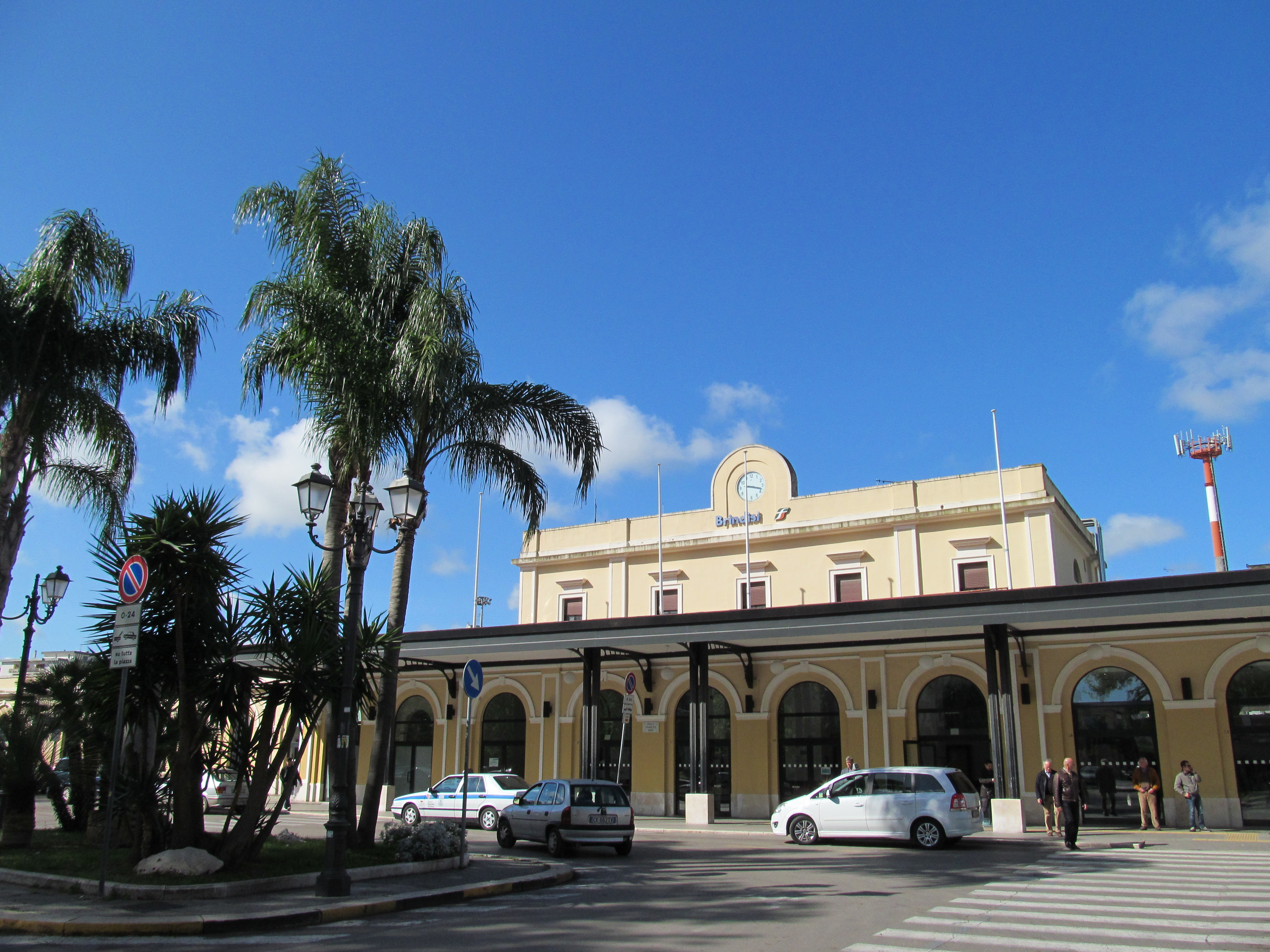
Brindisi railway station in 2014

Brindisi railway station (IATA: BQD) (Italian: Stazione di Brindisi) is the main station serving the city and comune of Brindisi, in the region of Apulia, southern Italy. Opened in 1865, it forms part of the Adriatic Railway (Ancona–Lecce), and is also a junction for, and terminus of, the Taranto–Brindisi railway.

The station is currently managed by Rete Ferroviaria Italiana (RFI). However, the commercial area of the passenger building is managed by Centostazioni. Train services are operated on behalf of Trenitalia. Each of these companies is a subsidiary of Ferrovie dello Stato (FS), Italy's state-owned rail company.

== Location ==
Brindisi railway station is situated at Piazza Francesco Crispi, at the southwest edge of the city centre.

== History ==
The station was opened on 29 April 1865, during an era of economic expansion, upon the inauguration of the Bari–Brindisi section of the Adriatic Railway. Nearly nine months later, on 15 January 1866, the Adriatic Railway was extended from Brindisi to Lecce.

Built like a typical transit station, the passenger building had a structure characterized by a sloping flat roof covering the two through tracks and the pedestrian level crossing between platforms.

On 30 December 1886, Brindisi became a junction station, when the final section of the Taranto–Brindisi railway was opened, between Mesagne and Brindisi.

== Features ==
Today, the station has eight tracks used by Trenitalia, and a link with the Brindisi Marittima railway station, once connected by ship to Greece, but now dismantled.

The station was included in the Centostazioni program of rehabilitation of the main Italian stations. At Brindisi, the rehabilitation project includes an increase and reorganization of space for passengers with significant improvements in services.

== Train services ==
The trains stopping at the station range from regional services to InterCity and Eurostar trains. The following list shows the services calling here, and the main stations. Eurostar and Intercity are express services, Treno Regionale are services that stop at all/most stations.

The station is served by the following services:

- High speed services (Frecciargento) Rome - Foggia - Bari - Brindisi - Lecce
- High speed services (Frecciabianca) Milan - Parma - Bologna - Ancona - Pescara - Foggia - Bari - Brindisi - Lecce
- High speed services (Frecciabianca) Turin - Parma - Bologna - Ancona - Pescara - Foggia - Bari - Brindisi - Lecce
- High speed services (Frecciabianca) Venice - Padua - Bologna - Ancona - Pescara - Foggia - Bari - Brindisi - Lecce
- Intercity services Bologna - Rimini - Ancona - Pescara - Foggia - Bari - Brindisi - Lecce
- Night train (Intercity Notte) Rome - Foggia - Bari - Brindisi - Lecce
- Night train (Intercity Notte) Milan - Parma - Bologna - Ancona - Pescara - Foggia - Bari - Brindisi - Lecce
- Night train (Intercity Notte) Milan - Ancona - Pescara - Foggia - Bari - Taranto - Brindisi - Lecce
- Night train (Intercity Notte) Turin - Alessandria - Bologna - Ancona - Pescara - Foggia - Bari - Brindisi - Lecce
- Regional services (Treno regionale) Bari - Monopoli - Brindisi - Lecce
- Local services (Treno regionale) Taranto - Francavilla Fontana - Brindisi

== See also ==
- Brindisi Marittima railway station
- History of rail transport in Italy
- List of railway stations in Apulia
- Rail transport in Italy
- Railway stations in Italy
