= Acquaviva delle Fonti railway station =

Railway station in Italy

Acquaviva delle Fonti
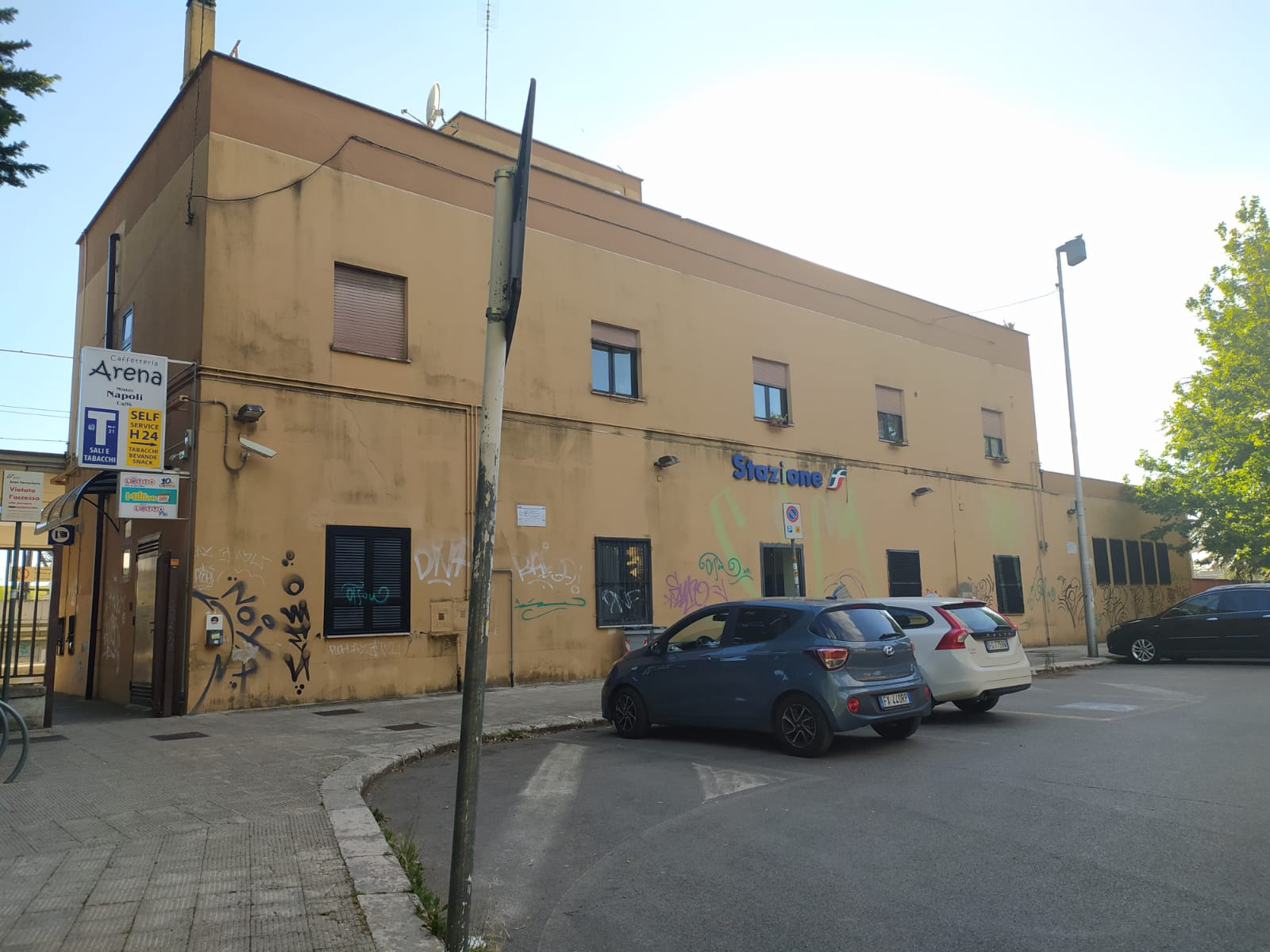
- Acquaviva delle Fonti railway station

General information
- Location: Acquaviva delle Fonti, Metropolitan City of Bari, Apulia; Italy
- Coordinates: 40°53′33″N 16°50′23″E
- Owner: Rete Ferroviaria Italiana
- Operator: Trenitalia
- Line: Bari–Taranto railway
- Distance: 37.3 kilometres (23.2 mi) from Bari Centrale
- Platforms: 3

Services
Preceding station	Trenitalia	Following station
Grumo Appula towards Bari Centrale	Regionale; Bari–Taranto	Gioia del Colle towards Taranto
Location
- Location within Apulia Location within Italy

Acquaviva delle Fonti railway station (Italian: Stazione di Acquaviva delle Fonti) is a railway station in Acquaviva delle Fonti, Italy. The station is located on the Bari–Taranto railway. The station was originally 40.3 kilometres (25.0 mi) from Bari Centrale; line straightening efforts between Acquaviva delle Fonti and Bitetto-Palo del Colle reduced this to 37.4 kilometres (23.2 mi). The train services are operated by Trenitalia.

== Services ==
As of the June 2025 timetable change, the following services stop at Acquaviva delle Fonti:

- Regionale: local service between Bari Centrale and Taranto.
