= Grumo Appula railway station =

Railway station in Italy

Grumo Appula
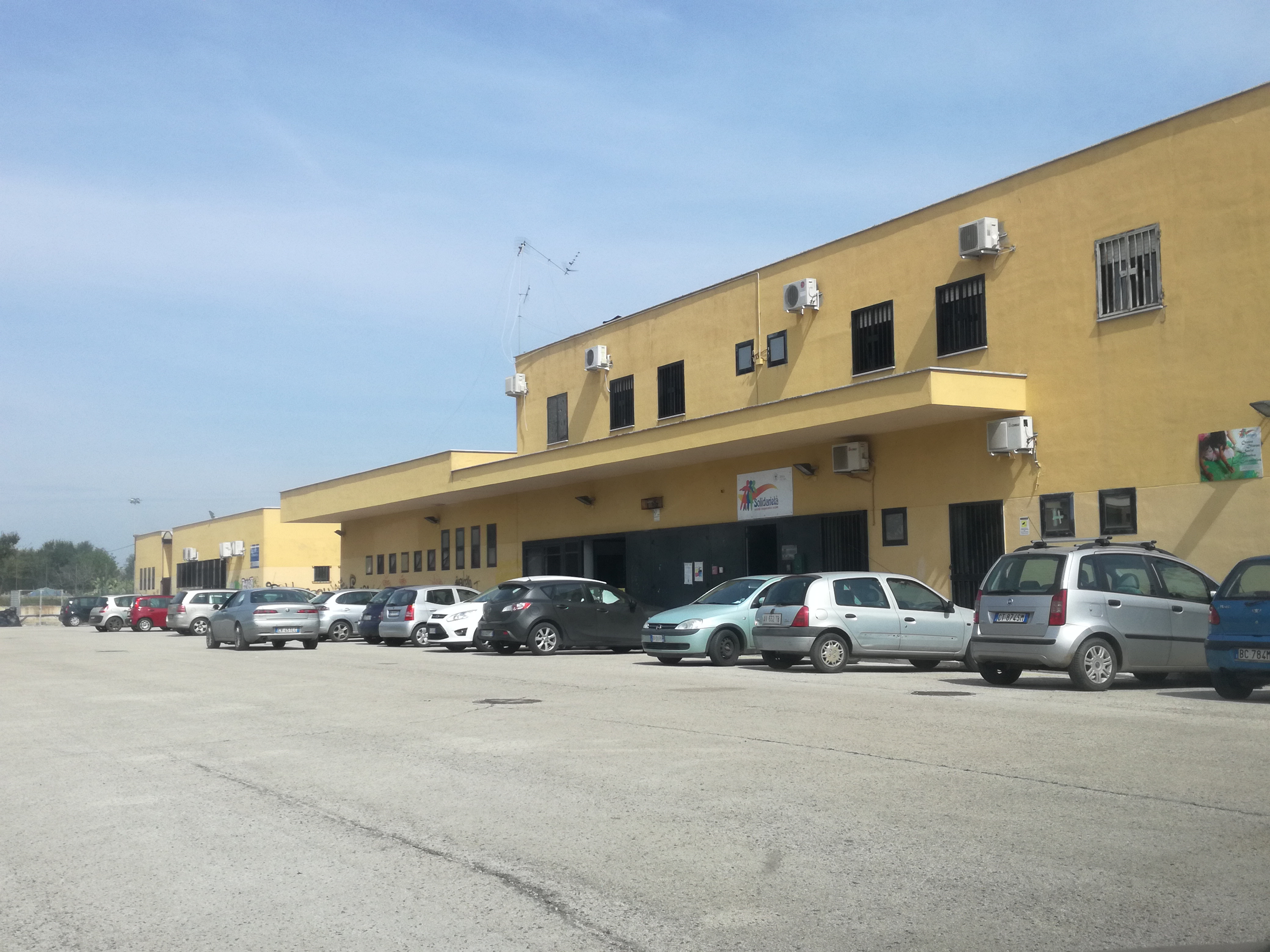
- The station entrance in 2017

General information
- Location: Grumo Appula, Province of Bari, Apulia; Italy
- Coordinates: 41°00′55″N 16°43′09″E
- Owner: Rete Ferroviaria Italiana
- Operator: Trenitalia
- Line: Bari–Taranto railway
- Distance: 19 kilometres (12 mi) from Bari Centrale
- Platforms: 3

Services
Preceding station	Trenitalia	Following station
Bitetto-Palo del Colle towards Bari Centrale	Regionale; Bari–Taranto	Acquaviva delle Fonti towards Taranto
Location
- Location within Apulia Location within Italy

Grumo Appula railway station (Italian: Stazione di Grumo Appula) is a railway station in Grumo Appula, Italy. The station is located on the Bari–Taranto railway. The train services are operated by Trenitalia.

== Services ==
As of the June 2025 timetable change, the following services stop at Grumo Appula:

- Regionale: local service between Bari Centrale and Taranto.
