= Castellaneta railway station =

Railway station in Castellaneta, Italy

Castellaneta
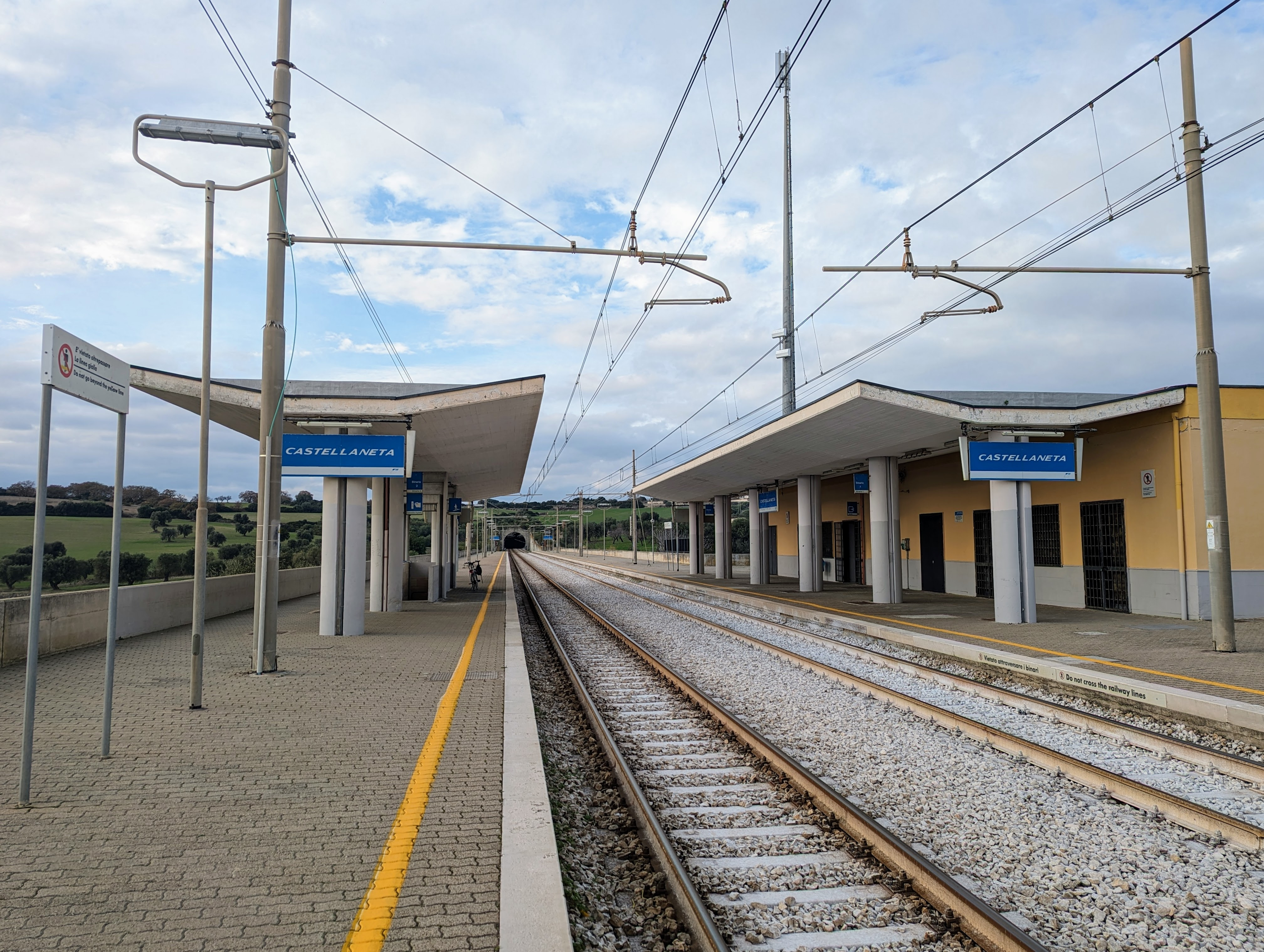
- Station platforms in 2023

General information
- Location: Castellaneta, Province of Taranto, Apulia; Italy
- Coordinates: 40°37′10″N 16°55′43″E
- Owner: Rete Ferroviaria Italiana
- Operator: Trenitalia
- Line: Bari–Taranto railway

History
- Opened: 14 September 1997

Services
Preceding station	Trenitalia	Following station
Gioia del Colle towards Bari Centrale	Regionale; Bari–Taranto	Palagianello towards Taranto
Location
- Location within Apulia Location within Italy

Castellaneta railway station (Italian: Stazione di Castellaneta) is a railway station in Castellaneta, Italy. The station is located on the Bari–Taranto railway. The train services are operated by Trenitalia.

== History ==
The station opened on 14 September 1997, as part of a project that double-tracked and realigned the Bari–Taranto railway between Gioia del Colle and Castellaneta.

== Services ==
As of the June 2025 timetable change, the following services stop at Castellaneta:

- Regionale: local service between Bari Centrale and Taranto.
