= Palagianello railway station =

Italian train station

Palagianello

General information
- Location: Palagianello, Province of Taranto, Apulia; Italy
- Coordinates: 40°36′24″N 16°59′07″E
- Owner: Rete Ferroviaria Italiana
- Operator: Trenitalia
- Line: Bari–Taranto railway

History
- Opened: 22 June 2008

Services
Preceding station	Trenitalia	Following station
Castellaneta towards Bari Centrale	Regionale; Bari–Taranto	Massafra towards Taranto
Location
- Location within Apulia Location within Italy

Palagianello railway station (Italian: Stazione di Palagianello) is a railway station in Palagianello, Italy. The station is located on the Bari–Taranto railway. The train services are operated by Trenitalia.

== History ==
The current station opened on 22 June 2008, south of the original station in the center of town. This was as part of the upgrade of the route between Bari and Taranto. The old alignment of the track is now a cycle way through the centre of Palagianello.

== Services ==
As of the June 2025 timetable change, the following services stop at Palagianello:

- Regionale: local service between Bari Centrale and Taranto.
