= Massafra railway station =

Railway station in Italy

Massafra

General information
- Location: 74016 Massafra; Italy
- Coordinates: 40°34′58″N 17°06′29″E
- Owner: Rete Ferroviaria Italiana
- Operator: Trenitalia
- Line: Bari–Taranto railway
- Platforms: 2

Services
Preceding station	Trenitalia	Following station
Palagianello towards Bari Centrale	Regionale; Bari–Taranto	Taranto Terminus
Location
- Location within Apulia Location within Italy

Massafra railway station (Italian: Stazione di Massafra) is a railway station in Massafra, Italy. The station is located on the Bari–Taranto railway. The train services are operated by Trenitalia.

== Services ==
As of the June 2025 timetable change, the following services stop at Massafra:

- Regionale: local service between Bari Centrale and Taranto.
