= Mesagne =

- Comune
- Città di Mesagne
- Coat of arms

- Location of Mesagne in Italy Mesagne (Apulia)
- Coordinates: 40°34′N 17°48′E
- Country: Italy
- Region: Apulia
- Province: Brindisi (BR)

Government
  - Mayor: Toni Matarrelli

Area
  - Total: 124.05 km^{2} (47.90 sq mi)
- Elevation: 72 m (236 ft)

Population (31 October 2017)
  - Total: 26,845
  - Density: 216.40/km^{2} (560.49/sq mi)
- Demonym: Mesagnesi
- Time zone: UTC+1 (CET)
  - Summer (DST): UTC+2 (CEST)
- Postal code: 72023
- Dialing code: 0831
- Patron saint: Madonna del Carmine
- Saint day: 16 July
- Website: Official website

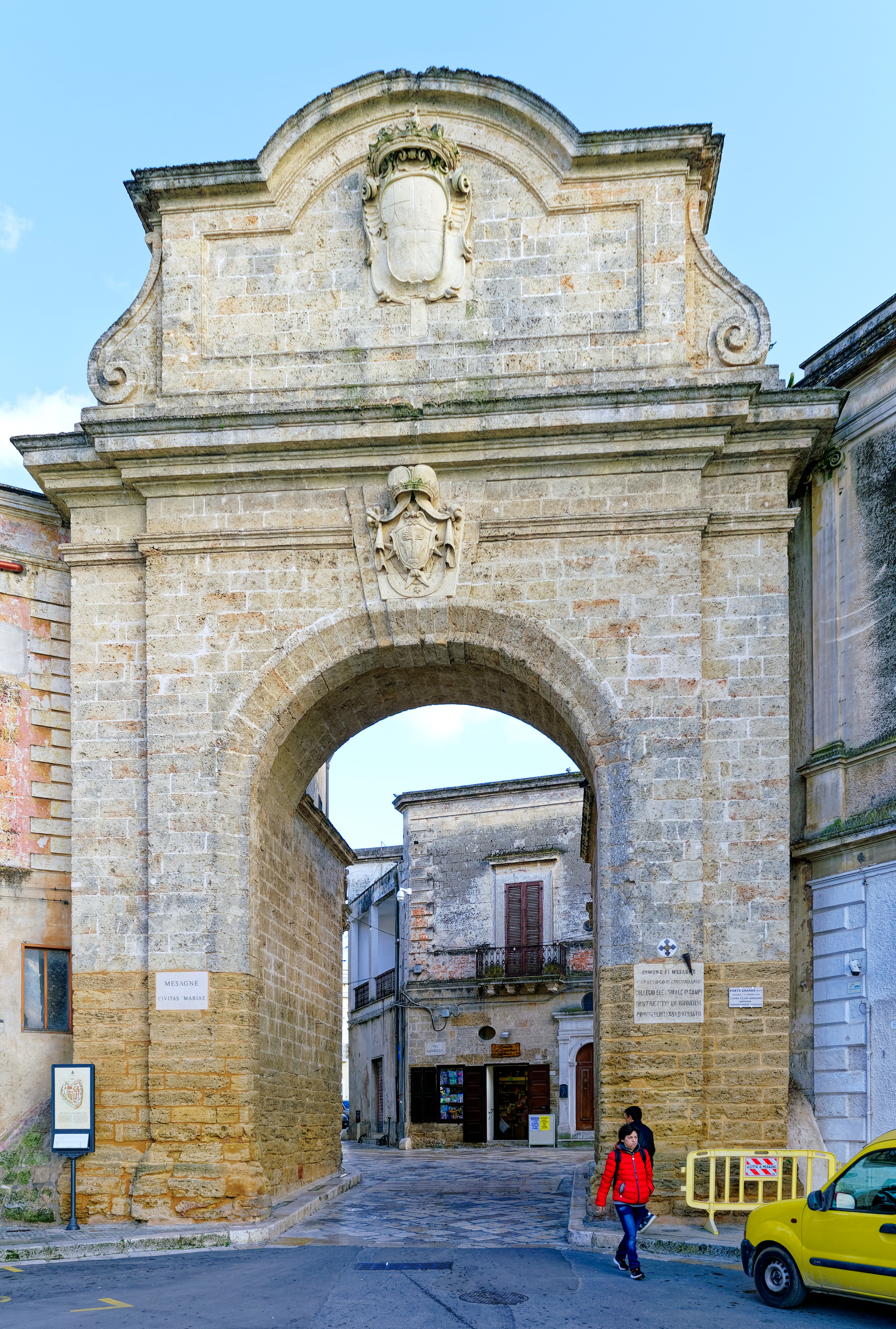
City gate ("Porta Grande", lit. Great Gate) in the old town of Mesagne.

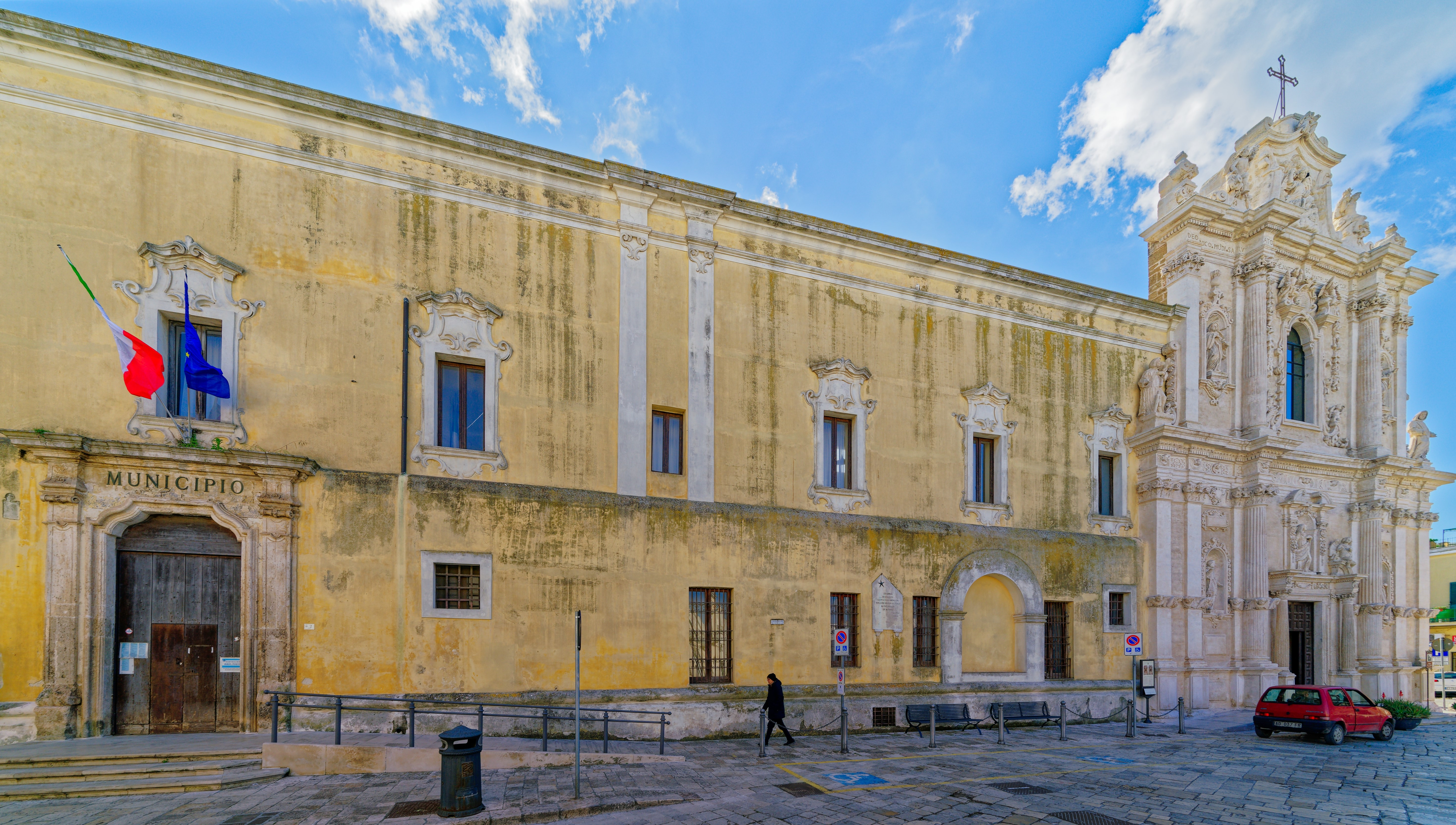
Town Hall and Church of Mesagne.

Mesagne (salentino: Misciàgni) is a comune in the province of Brindisi and region of Apulia, on the south-east Italy coast. Its main economic activities are tourism and the growing of olives and grapes. It is the fifth most-populous town of the province, and it is 15 kilometres (9 mi) from Brindisi.

== History ==
Mesagne was an important center when Apulia was dominated by the Messapians, because it joined Oria to the port of Brindisi. After the Roman conquest, it was also an important city located on the Appian Way. Its name is from these times. In the Middle Ages it was called Castrum Medianum, then Castro Misciano, this is the name used from the 16th century. When Giovanni Antonio Orsini Del Balzo decided to expend the city's castle, Mesagne evolved, with the construction of a theater, a hospital and the paving of roads. The city remains important in the economy of the province to this day, with much industry in the area.

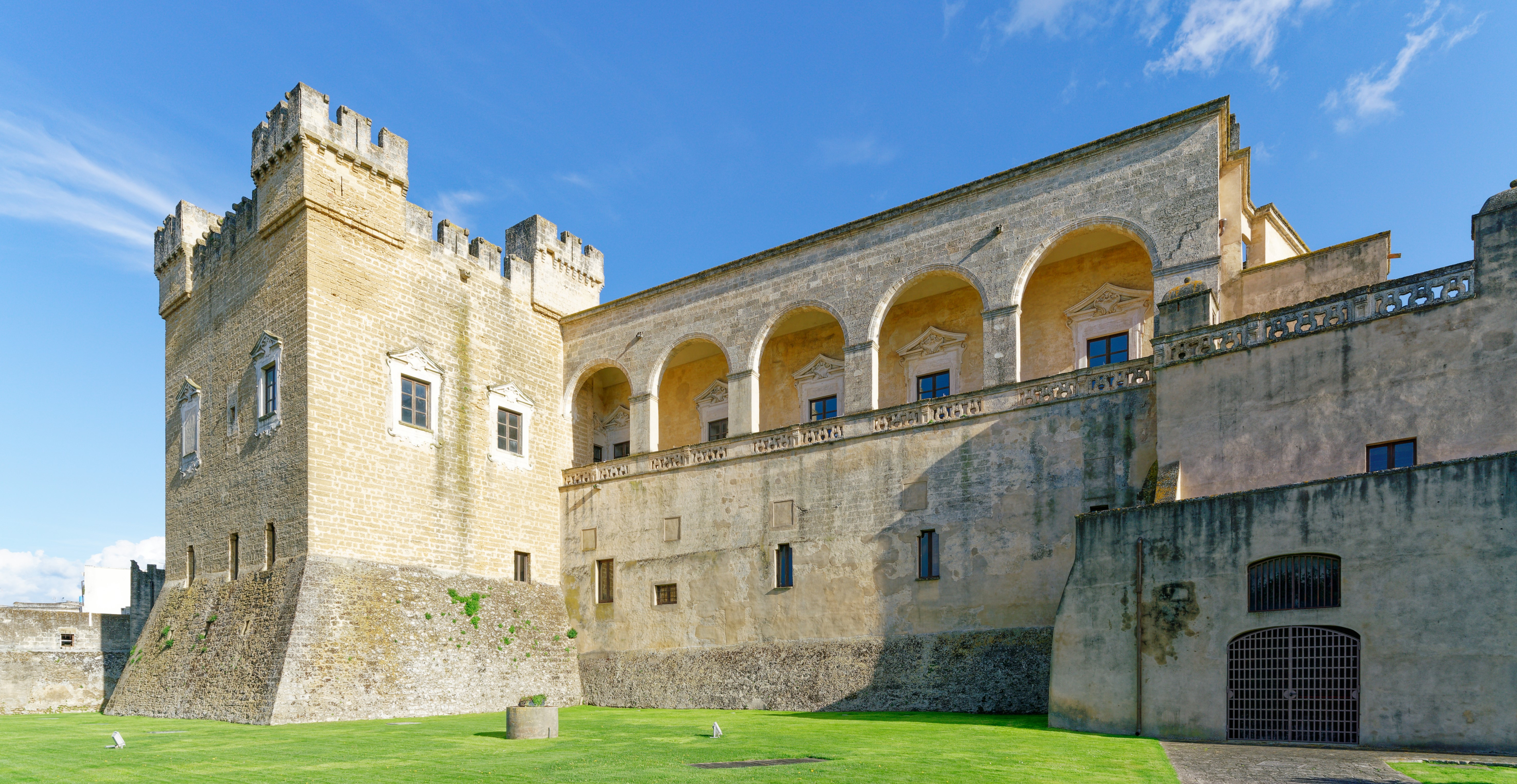
The castle.

== Main sights ==
- The castle, existing from the 11th century; in 1195 it was given to the Teutonic Knights. Today it houses an archaeological museum
- Messapic necropolises
- 15th century walls
- Palaeo-Christian church (tempietto) of St. Lawrence (7th century)
- Basilica del Carmine (14th century)
- Mater Domini church (1598–1605)

== Local culture ==
=== Events ===
- Natale Nel Cuore (Christmas in Heart): exposition of little statuettes representing the most important characters of Christmas
- Cavalcata dei Magi (Cavalcade of the Magi): Historical.

=== Sagre ===
- Sagra ti la fucazza chena: Festival of the stuffed oven-baked bread (made by a type of pizza dough)
- Sagra ti li stacchioddi: Festival of Orecchiette ("little ears") a type of homemade fresh pasta
- Sagra ti li peschi: Festival of peaches

== Sport ==
In Mesagne, the most popular sport practised is football. The local team is named A.S.D. Mesagne 1929. The team plays in the Promozione championship.

Basketball has two male teams: Mens Sana Mesagne and Virtus Mesagne, which play in the C2 championship. Also the female team, Meyana Mesagne, plays in A2 championship.

The city's female volleyball team, Volley Mesagne, plays in the C championship.

Carlo Molfetta was taekwondo gold medal in the 80+ kg category at the 2012 Summer Olympics of London.

== See also ==
- Mesagne railway station
