= Gioia del Colle railway station =

Railway station in Gioia del Colle, Italy

Gioia del Colle
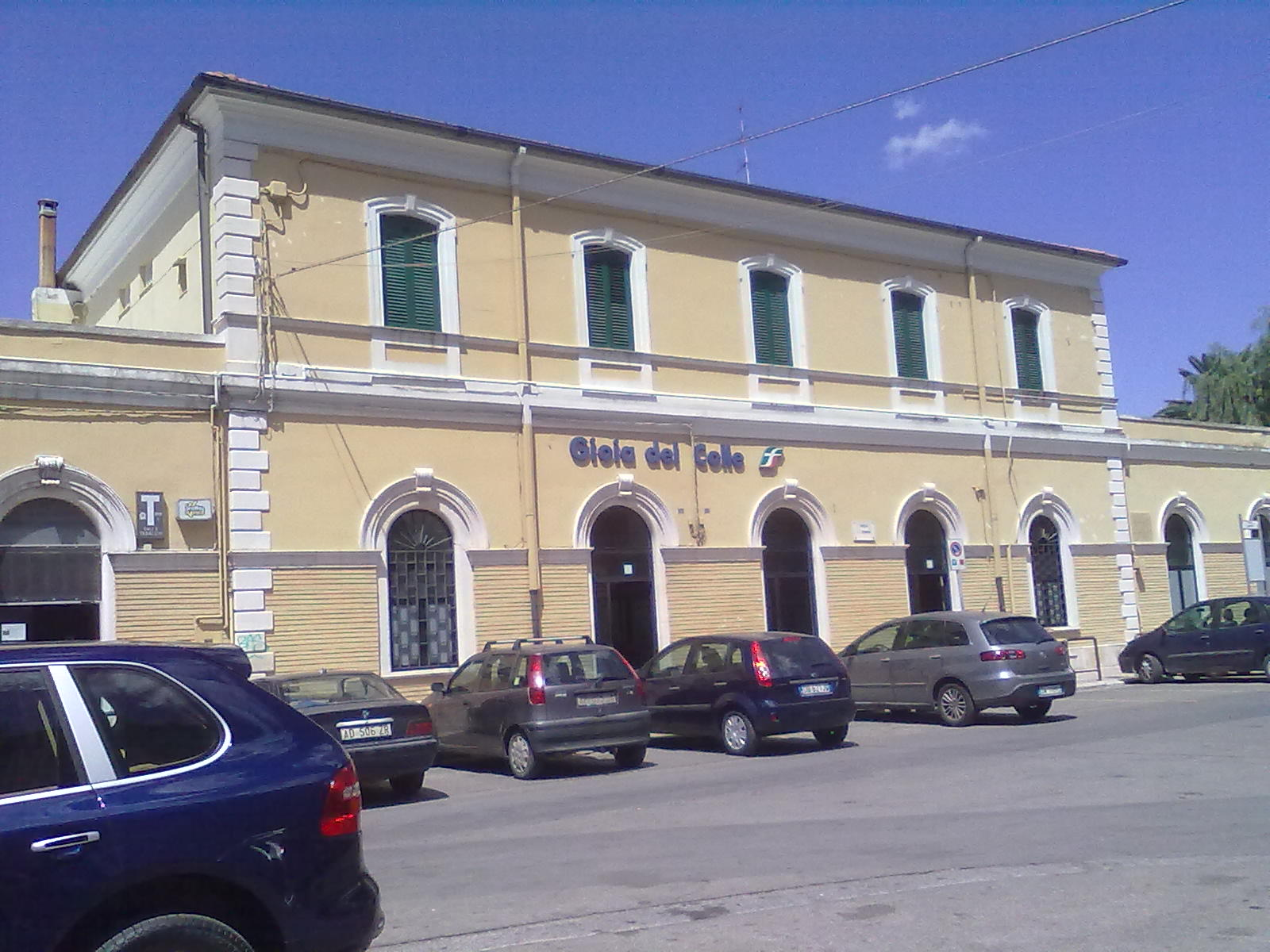
- Gioia del Colle railway station

General information
- Location: Gioia del Colle, Bari, Apulia; Italy
- Coordinates: 40°47′48″N 16°54′59″E
- Owner: Rete Ferroviaria Italiana
- Lines: Bari–Taranto railway Rocchetta Sant'Antonio-Gioia del Colle railway line
- Platforms: 5
- Train operators: Trenitalia

Other information
- Classification: Bronze

History
- Opened: 1865

Services
Preceding station	Trenitalia	Following station
Bari Centrale towards Milano Centrale	Frecciarossa	Taranto Terminus
Bari Centrale towards Milano Centrale or Milano Porta Garibaldi	InterCity; Milan–Lecce	Taranto towards Lecce
Bari Centrale Terminus	InterCity; Reggio Calabria–Bari/Lecce	Taranto towards Reggio di Calabria Centrale
Bari Centrale towards Milano Centrale	InterCity Notte; Milan–Lecce	Taranto towards Lecce
Acquaviva delle Fonti towards Bari Centrale	Regionale; Bari–Taranto	Castellaneta towards Taranto
Location
- Location within Apulia Location within Italy

Gioia del Colle is a railway station in Gioia del Colle, Italy. The station is located on the Bari–Taranto railway and Rocchetta Sant'Antonio-Gioia del Colle railway line. The train services are operated by Trenitalia.

Regular service over the Rocchetta Sant'Antonio-Gioia del Colle ended on 11 December 2016.

== Services ==
As of the June 2025 timetable change, the following services stop at Gioia del Colle:

- Frecciarossa: high-speed service between Milano Centrale and Taranto.
- InterCity#Italy: daytime and nighttime service between Milan and Lecce.
- Regionale: local service between Bari Centrale and Taranto.
