= Bitetto-Palo del Colle railway station =

Italian train station

Bitetto Palo del Colle
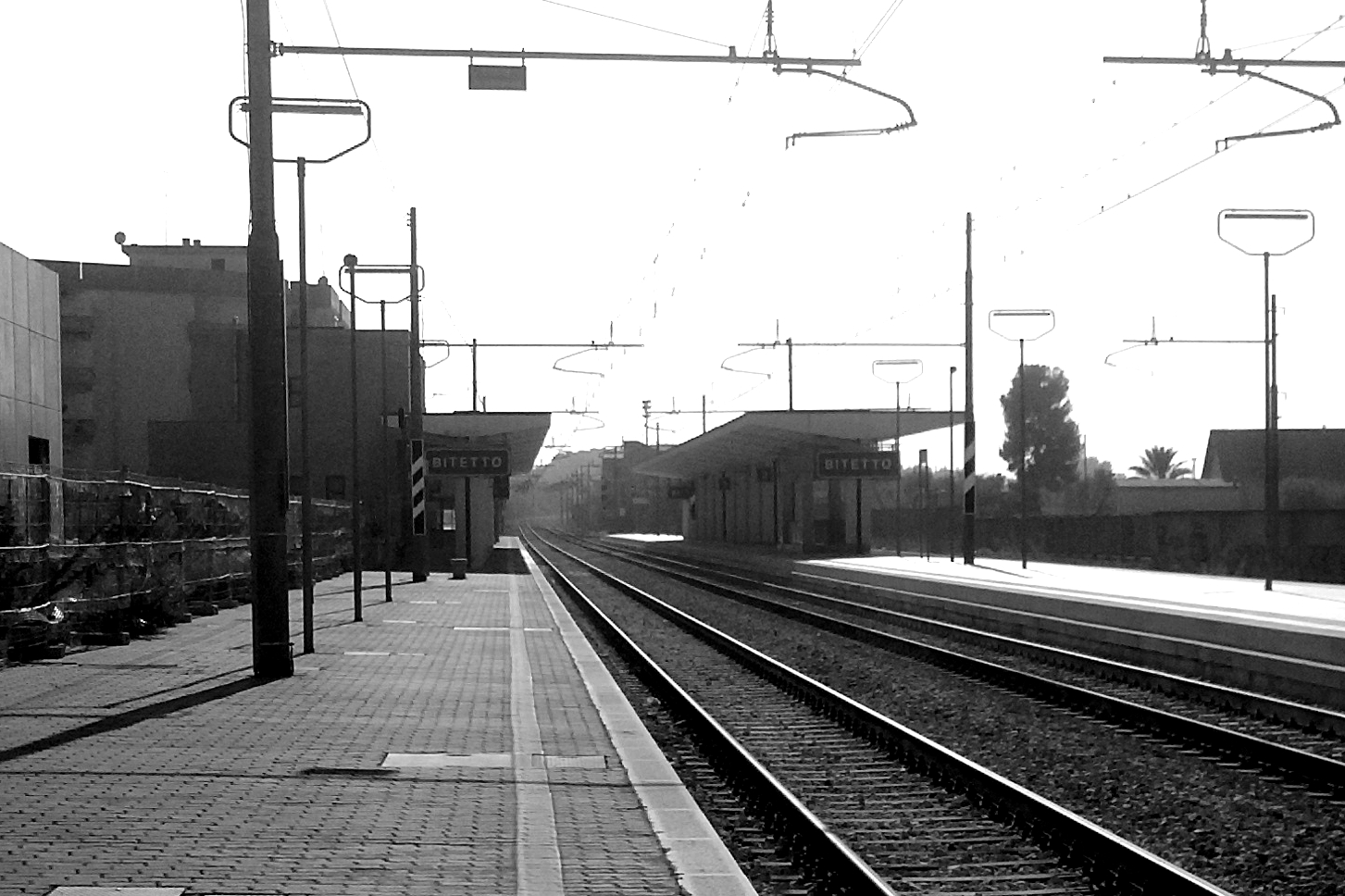
- Bitetto-Palo del Colle railway station

General information
- Location: Bitetto, Province of Bari, Apulia; Italy
- Coordinates: 41°02′44″N 16°44′36″E
- Owner: Rete Ferroviaria Italiana
- Operator: Trenitalia
- Line: Bari–Taranto railway
- Distance: 14.45 kilometres (8.98 mi) from Bari Centrale
- Platforms: 3

Services
Preceding station	Trenitalia	Following station
Modugno towards Bari Centrale	Regionale; Bari–Taranto	Grumo Appula towards Taranto
Location
- Location within Apulia Location within Italy

Bitetto-Palo del Colle railway station (Italian: Stazione di Bitetto-Palo del Colle) is a railway station in Bitetto, Italy. The station is located on the Bari–Taranto railway. The train services are operated by Trenitalia.

== Services ==
As of the June 2025 timetable change, the following services stop at Bitetto-Palo del Colle:

- Regionale: local service between Bari Centrale and Taranto.
