= San Basilio Mottola railway station =

Railway station in Italy

San Basilio Mottola

General information
- Location: San Basilio, Province of Taranto, Apulia; Italy
- Coordinates: 40°41′17″N 16°58′21″E
- Owner: Rete Ferroviaria Italiana
- Operator: Trenitalia
- Line: Bari–Taranto railway
- Platforms: 2

History
- Closed: 13 September 1997
- Electrified: 4 June 1980
Location
- Location within Apulia Location within Southern Italy Location within Italy

San Basilio Mottola is a closed railway station in San Basilio, Italy. The station was located on the original alignment of the Bari–Taranto railway between Gioia del Colle and Palagiano-Mottola. Due to upgrading of the route, the line was doubled and realigned, which meant that a number of towns and villages were left without a railway station. The abandoned section is about 32 km long; the former station building at San Basilio Mottola survives, overgrown by vegetation, together with the ex-electrical substation and railwaymen's housing.

== Train services ==
The station was served by the following service(s):

- Local services (Treno regionale) Bari - Gioia del Colle - Taranto
