= Mesagne railway station =

Railway station in Mesagne, Italy

Mesagne
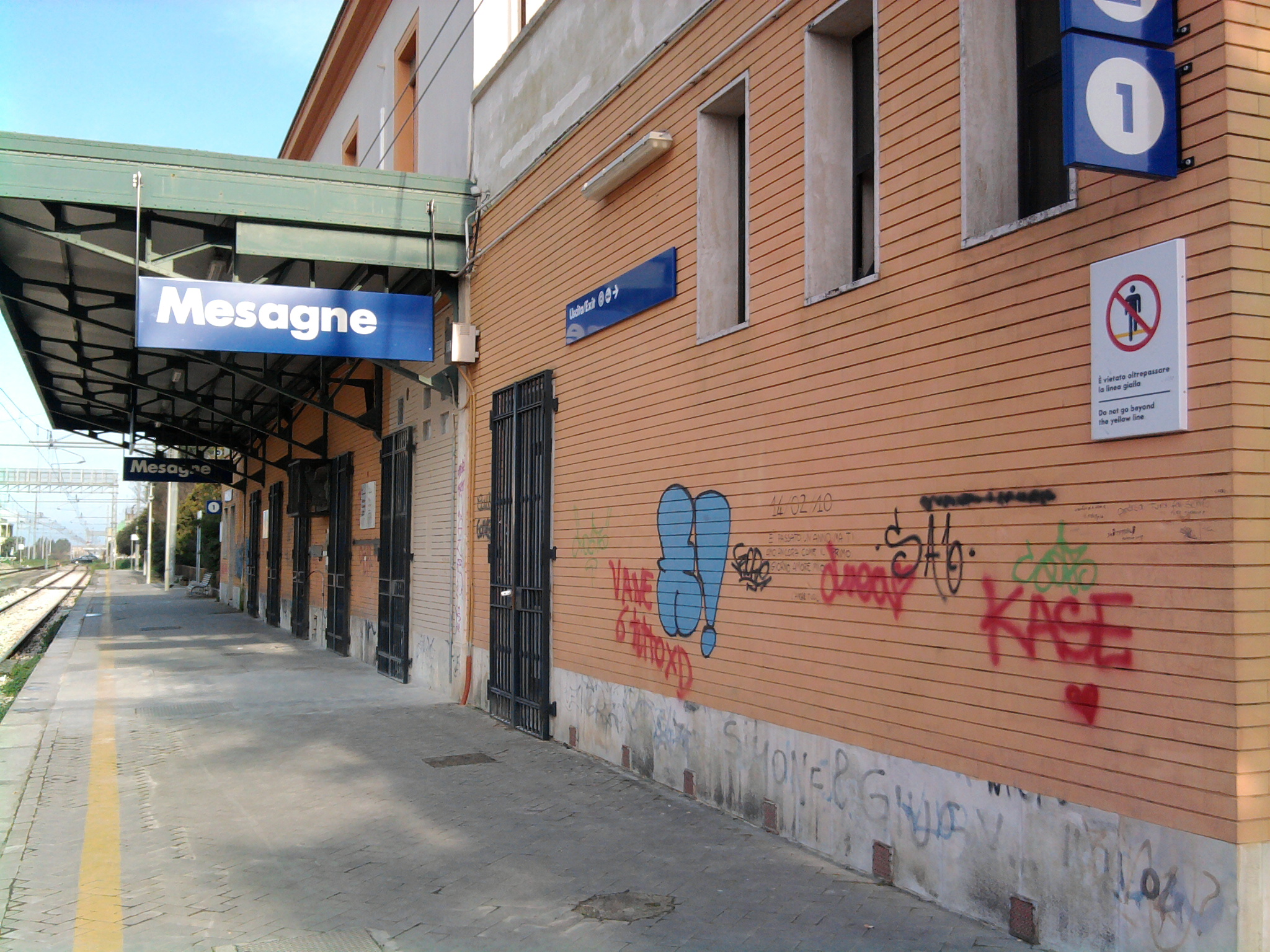
- Station building and platform 1

General information
- Location: Tenente Ugo Granafei; 93012 Mesagne (CL); Mesagne, Brindisi, Apulia; Italy
- Coordinates: 40°33′39″N 17°47′56″E
- Owner: Rete Ferroviaria Italiana
- Line: Taranto-Brindisi
- Platforms: 2
- Tracks: 3
- Train operators: Trenitalia

Other information
- Classification: Bronze

History
- Opened: 25 August 1886; 140 years ago
Location
- Location within Apulia Location within Italy

Mesagne (Italian: Stazione di Mesagne) is a railway station in the Italian town of Mesagne, in the Province of Brindisi, Apulia.

== Overview ==
The station lies on the Taranto–Brindisi railway and was opened on 25 August 1886. The train services are operated by Trenitalia. The station also serves San Donaci and San Pancrazio Salentino.

The station is on the list Pegasus of 101 stations to be modernised in 2016.

== Train services ==
The station is served by the following service(s):

- Regional trains: Lecce - Brindisi - Mesagne - Francavilla Fontana - Taranto

== See also ==
- Railway stations in Italy
- List of railway stations in Apulia
- Rail transport in Italy
- History of rail transport in Italy
