= Brindisi Marittima railway station =

Railway station in Italy

Brindisi Marittima

General information
- Location: Brindisi, Province of Brindisi, Apulia; Italy
- Coordinates: 40°38′20″N 17°56′56″E
- Owner: Rete Ferroviaria Italiana
- Operator: Trenitalia
- Line: Brindisi–Brindisi Marittima railway

History
- Opened: 1870; 156 years ago
- Closed: 2006; 20 years ago
Location
- Location within Apulia Location within Southern Italy Location within Italy

Brindisi Marittima was a railway station in Brindisi, Italy. The station was opened in 1870 and closed in 2006. It was located on the short Brindisi–Brindisi Marittima railway.

== History ==
The station was located at the port of Brindisi and connected the railway with the boat to Greece.

== Train services ==
The station was an important link between western Europe and Greece. Trains served the station with destinations such as Paris, Cologne and Vienna.

Until 1994 it was served by the express "Parthenon" Athens-Paris.

== Present day ==
The closure of the railway has resulted in the creation of a car park at the site of the railway station.
