= Taranto–Brindisi railway =

Railway line in Italy

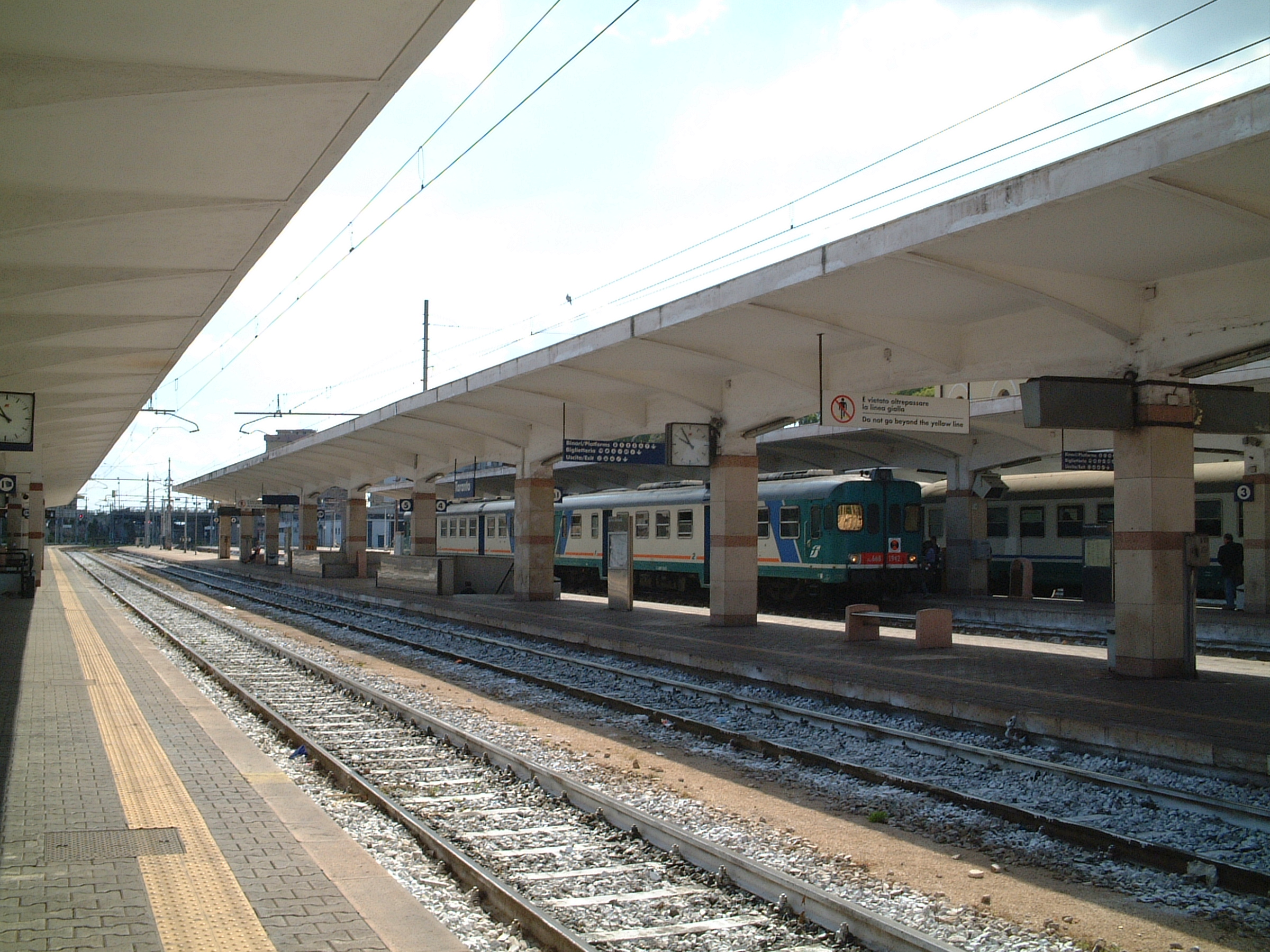
- Taranto railway station

Overview
- Status: Operational
- Line number: 135
- Locale: Apulia, Italy
- Termini: Taranto railway station; Brindisi railway station
- Stations: 12

Service
- Type: Heavy rail
- Operator(s): Rete Ferroviaria Italiana

History
- Opened: 1886

Technical
- Line length: 70 km (43 mi)
- Number of tracks: Single track
- Track gauge: 1,435 mm (4 ft 8 1/2 in) standard gauge
- Electrification: Electrified at 3000 V DC

The Taranto–Bridisi railway is an Italian 70-kilometre long railway line, connecting Taranto with Brindisi.

The line was opened in three stages in 1886. On 6 January 1886 the section from Taranto to Latiano opened, then with effect from 25 August 1886 the line was further extended from Latiano to Mesagne, and finally on 30 December 1886 the final length from Mesagne to Brindisi came into use.

== Usage ==
The line is used by the following service(s):

- Night train (Intercity Notte) Milan – Ancona – Pescara – Foggia – Bari – Taranto – Brindisi – Lecce
- Local services (Treno regionale) Taranto – Francavilla Fontana – Brindisi

== Gallery ==
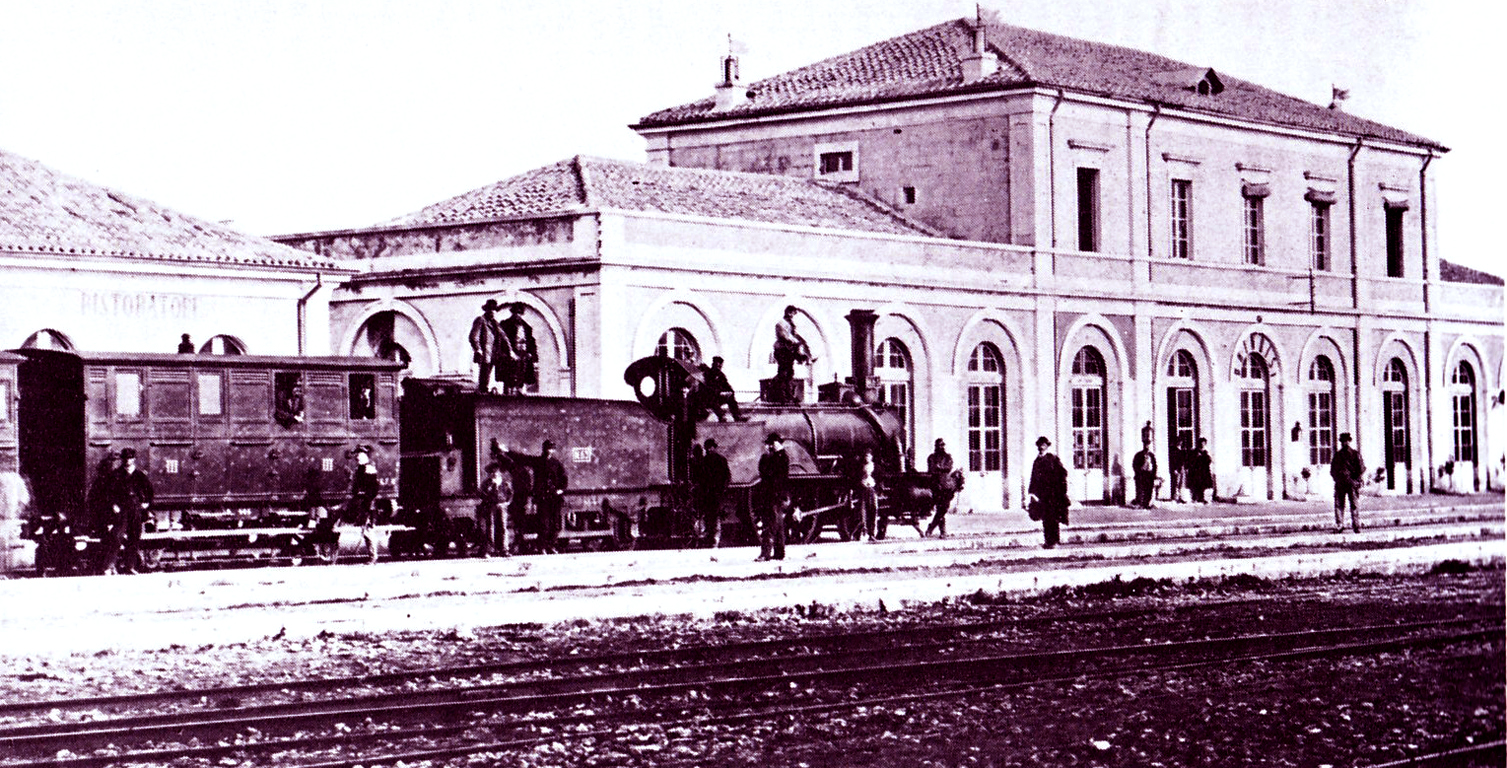
Brindisi in 1870, before this line was opened

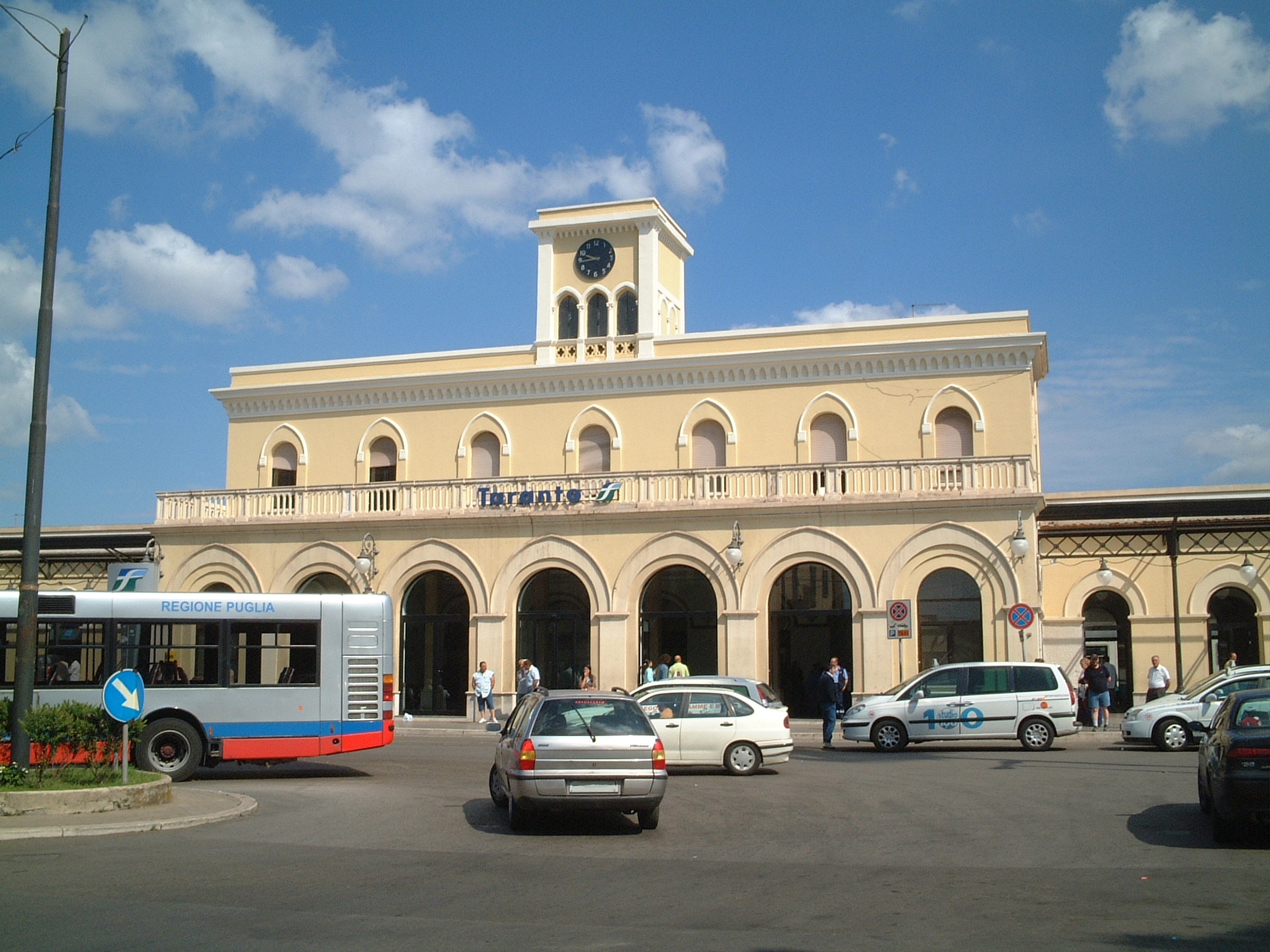
Taranto railway station in 2006

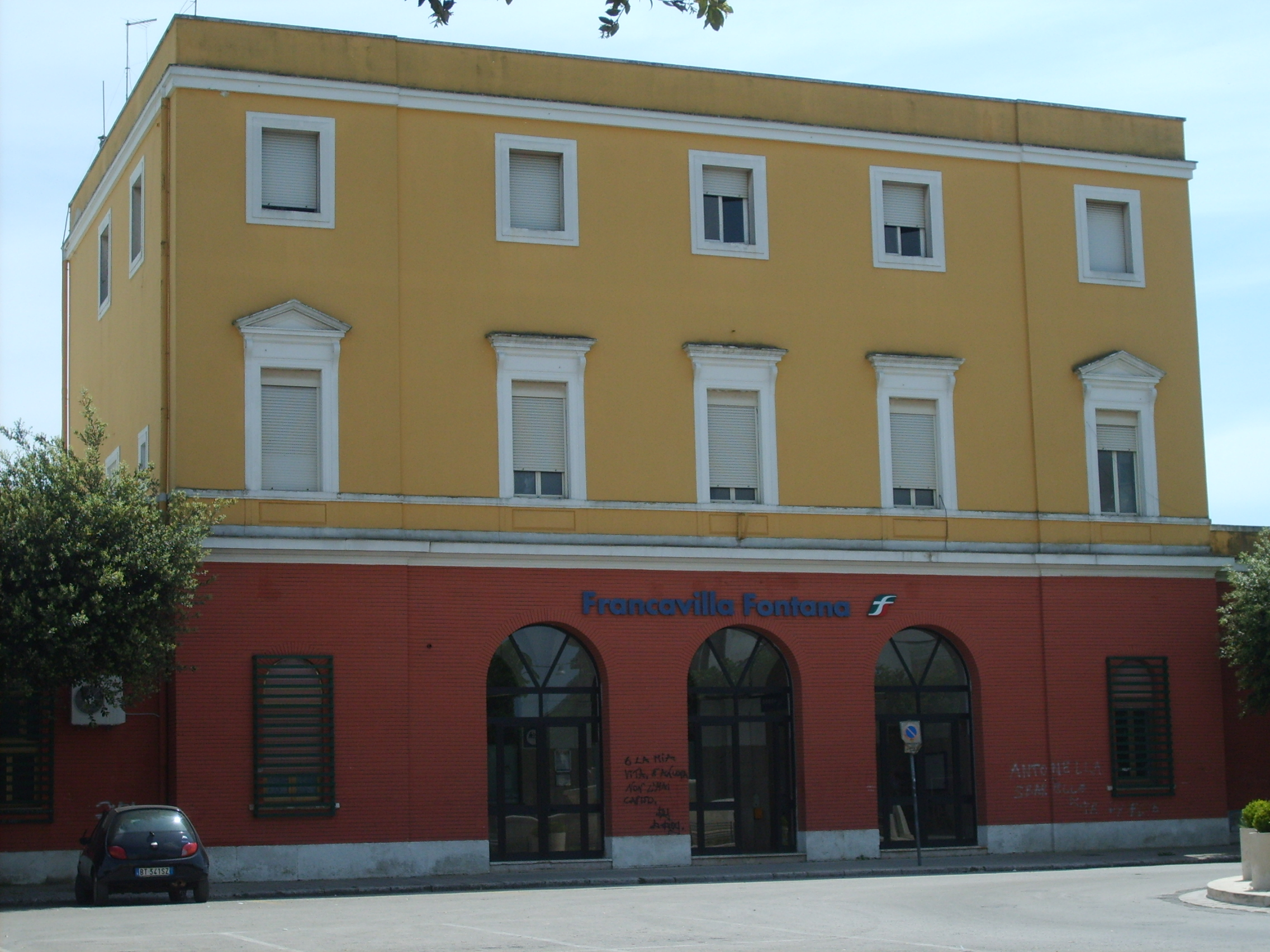
Francavilla Fontana railway station in 2009

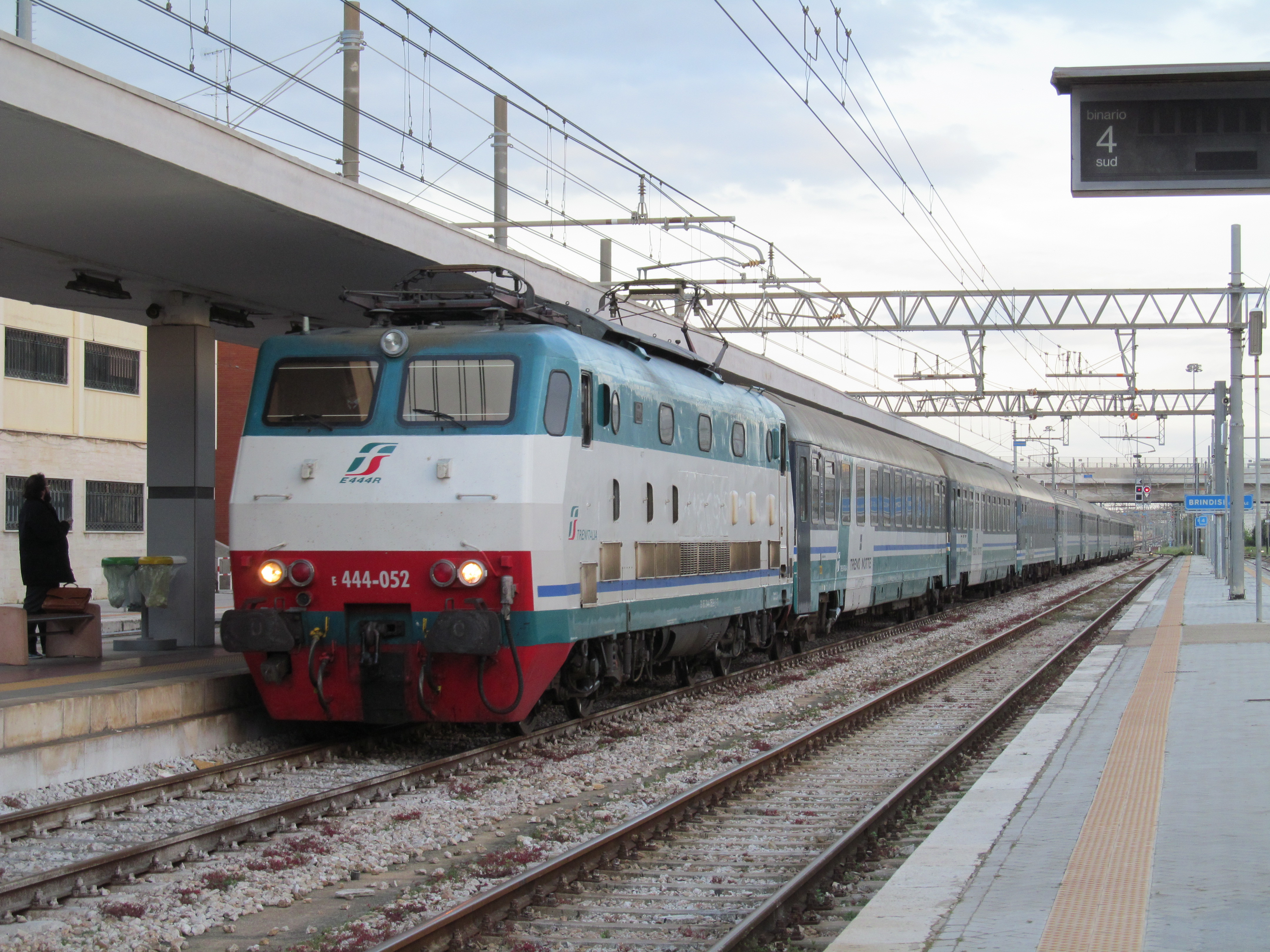
A night train at Brindisi before continuing to Taranto

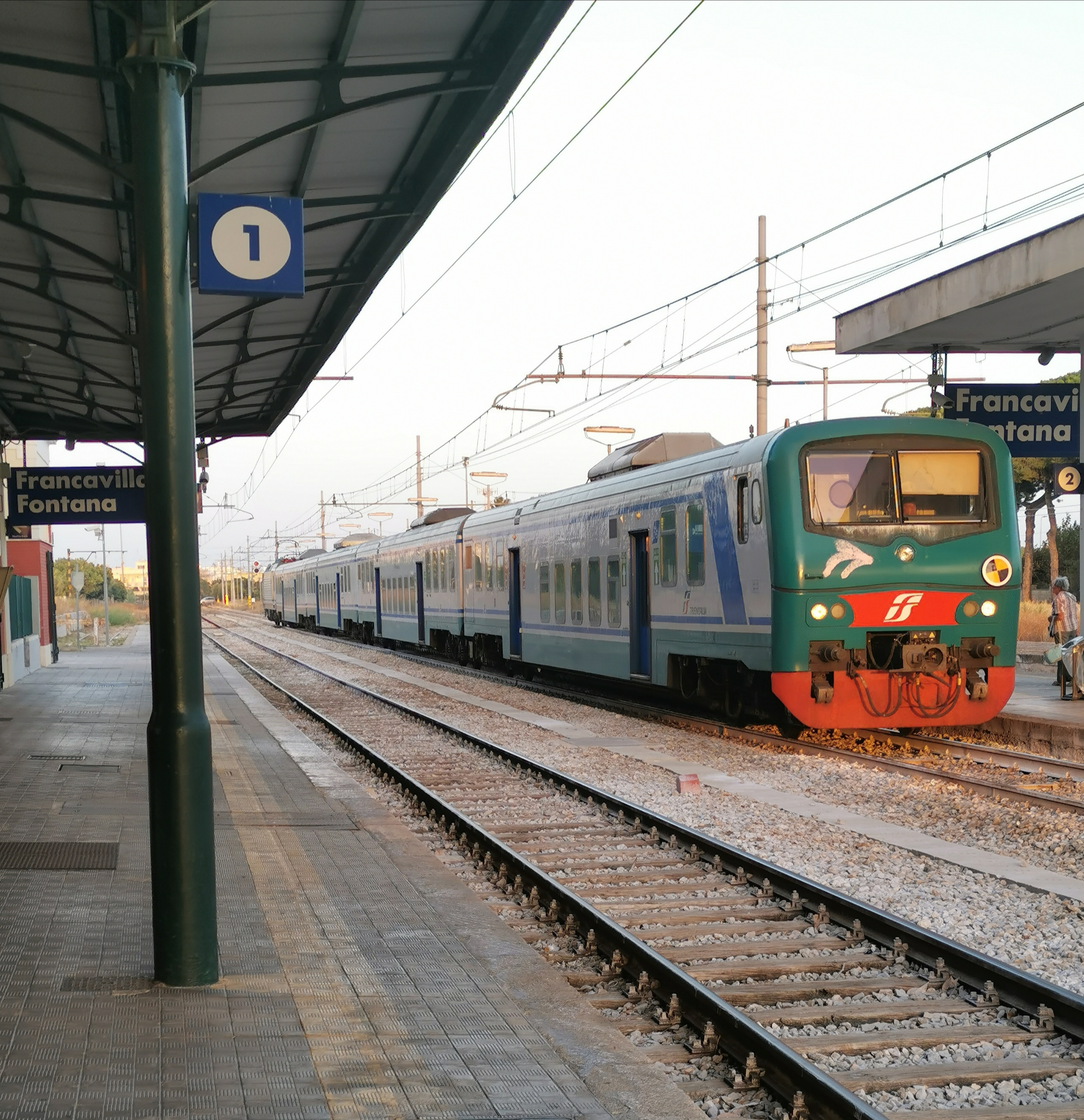
FS Class E.464 used in this line
