= Bari–Taranto railway =

Railway line in Italy

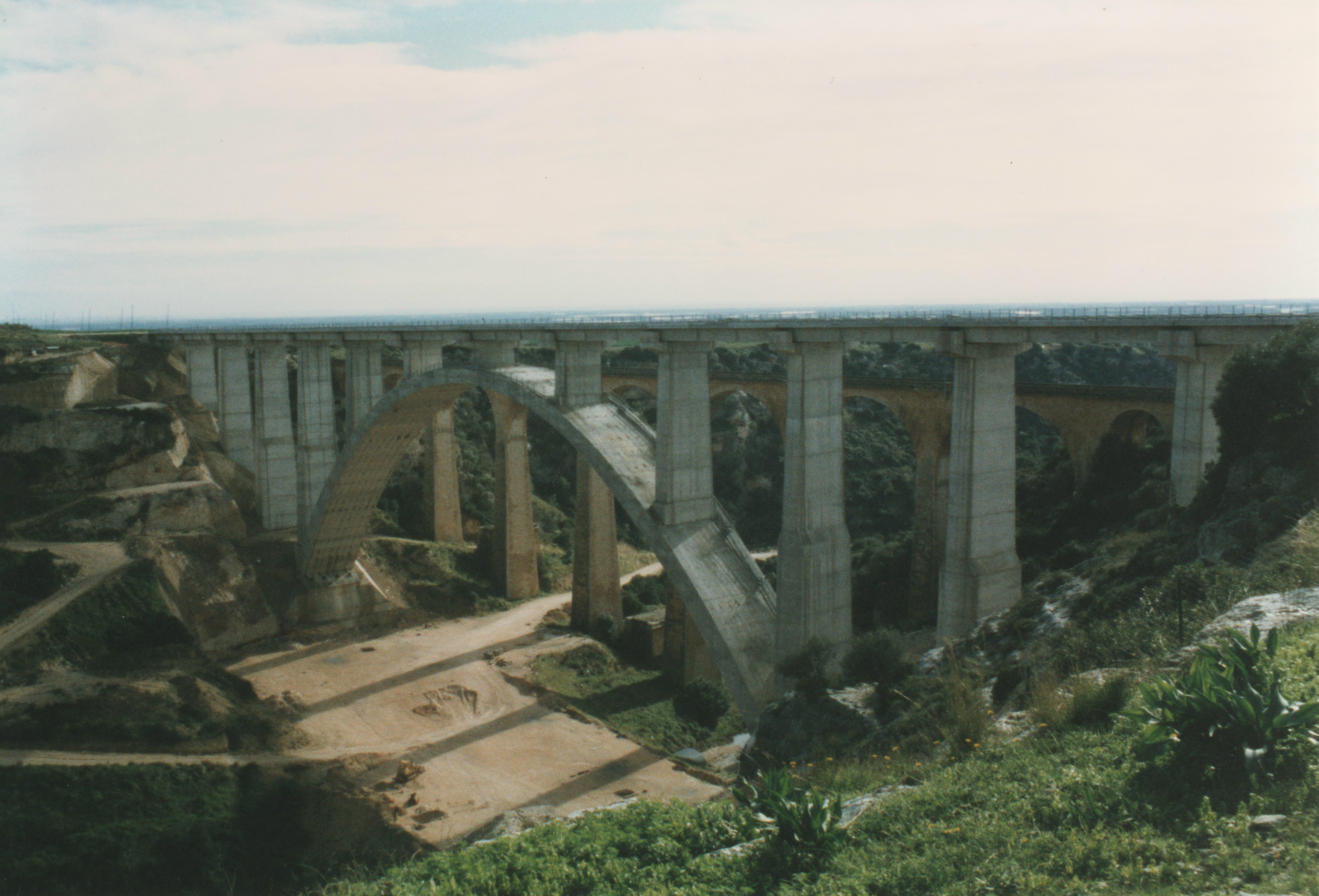

Overview
- Status: in use
- Owner: RFI
- Locale: Italy
- Termini: Bari; Taranto

Service
- Type: Heavy rail
- Operator(s): Trenitalia

History
- Opened: 1865 (Bari - Gioia del Colle); 1868 (Gioia del Colle - Taranto)

Technical
- Line length: 104 km (65 mi)
- Number of tracks: Double track
- Track gauge: 1,435 mm (4 ft 8 1/2 in) standard gauge
- Electrification: Electrified at 3000 V DC

The Bari–Taranto railway is an Italian 104-kilometre (65-mile) long railway line, that connects Bari with Gioia del Colle and Taranto.

== History ==
The line was opened in two stages between 1865 and 1868. On 1 June 1865 the section from Bari to Gioia del Colle opened; the line was further extended on 15 September 1868 to Taranto.

Following the passing of Law no. 324 of 15 July 1906, which approved "the Conventions for the redemption of the Strade Ferrate Meridionali", the line was nationalised by the Italian State and became part of the Ferrovie dello Stato.

Electrification at 3 kV DC, was activated on 4 June 1980.

== Route upgrade ==
Work has been carried out to upgrade and double the line since 1994. The first section opened on 31 May 1994 between Acquaviva delle Fonti and Bitetto–Palo del Colle.

On 14 September 1997, the double track between Gioia del Colle and Palagianello opened. The line was rerouted which saw the closure of stations of Coratini, Mottola-San Basilio, Castellaneta Campagna and Castellaneta Città.

On 20 December 2004 the line was doubled between Acquaviva delle Fonti and Gioia del Colle, and on 27 May 2007 between Palagiano and Bellavista.

On 27 May 2007, the doubling between Palagiano and Bellavista was activated.

On 22 June 2008, the line was doubled between Grottalupara and Palagiano, which included a new alignment avoiding the centre of Palagianello and the opening of a new station.

On 31 May 2009 the line was doubled between Bari Centrale and Bari Sant'Andrea, which led to the closure of Bari Policlinico station.

On 26 July 2020, the doubling of the deviation between the former Bari Sant'Andrea station and Bitetto–Palo del Colle was opened, including the new stops of Bari Villaggio del Lavoratore and Modugno. With the completion of these works, the entire line is double track.

== Usage ==
The line is used by the following service(s):

- High speed services (Frecciabianca) Milan - Parma - Bologna - Ancona - Pescara - Foggia - Bari - Taranto
- Intercity services Rome - Foggia - Bari - Taranto
- Intercity services Bologna - Rimini - Ancona - Pescara - Foggia - Bari - Taranto
- Night train (Intercity Notte) Milan - Ancona - Pescara - Foggia - Bari - Taranto - Brindisi - Lecce
- Local services (Treno regionale) Bari - Gioia del Colle - Taranto
- Local services (Treno regionale) Gravina in Puglia - Altamura - Gioia del Colle - Taranto

== See also ==
- List of railway lines in Italy
