= Taranto railway station =

Railway station in Taranto, Italy

Taranto
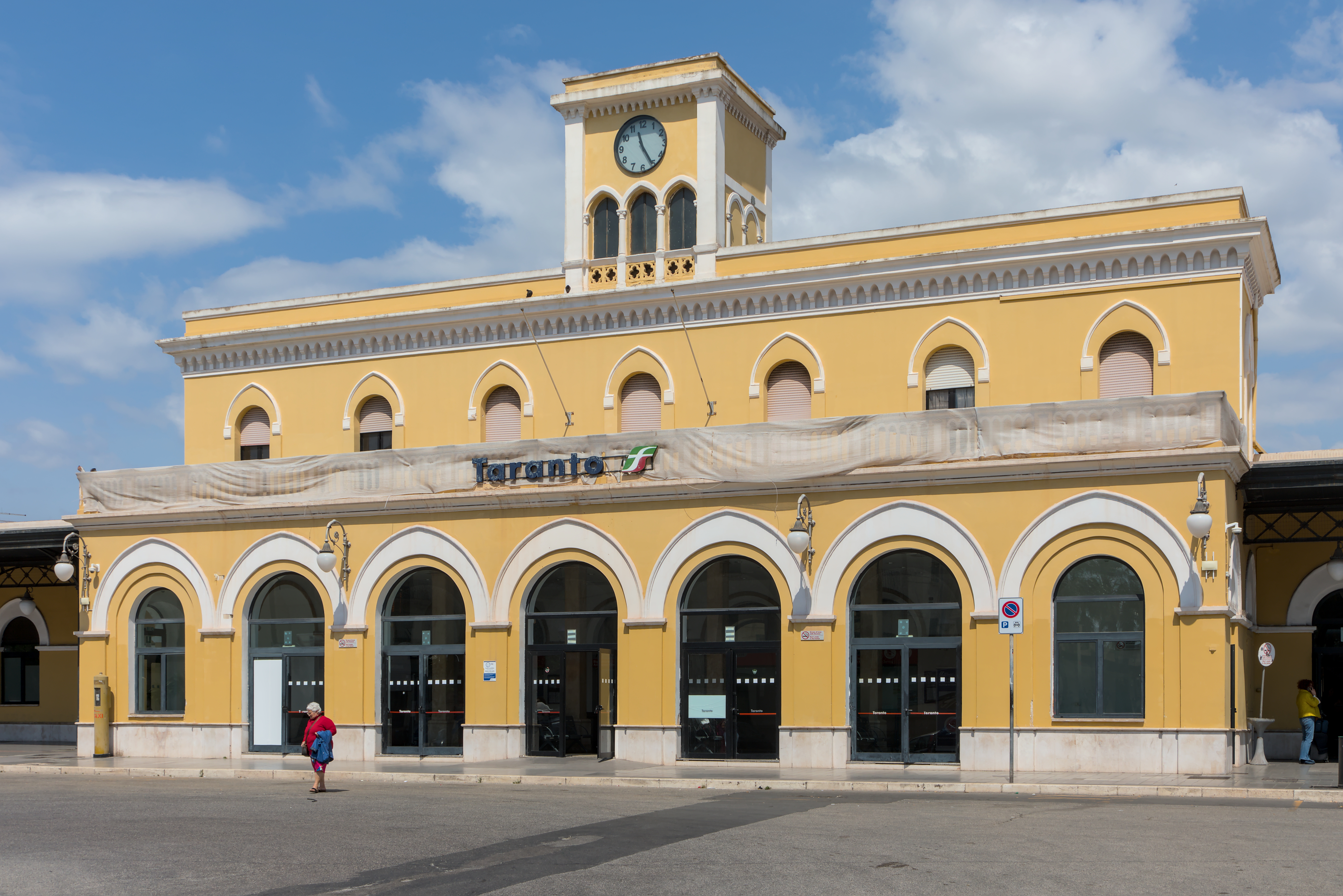
- The passenger building.

General information
- Coordinates: 40°28′59″N 17°13′26″E
- Operator: Trenitalia; Ferrovie del Sud Est (FSE)
- Lines: Bari–Taranto (Trenitalia); Taranto–Brindisi; Taranto–Reggio di Calabria; Bari–Martina Franca–Taranto (FSE)
- Distance: 114.529 km (71.165 mi) from Bari Centrale
- Platforms: 10

Other information
- Classification: Gold

History
- Opened: 15 September 1868

Services
Preceding station	Trenitalia	Following station
Gioia del Colle towards Milano Centrale	Frecciarossa	Terminus
Metaponto towards Roma Termini	InterCity; Rome–Taranto	Terminus
Metaponto towards Reggio di Calabria Centrale	InterCity; Reggio Calabria–Bari/Lecce	Gioia del Colle towards Bari Centrale
Metaponto towards Reggio di Calabria Centrale	InterCity; Reggio Calabria–Bari/Lecce	Lecce Terminus
Gioia del Colle towards Milano Centrale	InterCity Notte; Milan–Lecce	Francavilla Fontana towards Lecce
Massafra towards Bari Centrale	Regionale; Bari–Taranto	Terminus
Palagiano-Chiatona towards Potenza Centrale	Regionale; Potenza–Taranto	Terminus
Terminus	Regionale; Taranto–Brindisi	Grottaglie towards Brindisi
Preceding station	Ferrovie del Sud Est	Following station
Taranto Galese towards Martina Franca	Regionale; Martina Franca–Taranto	Terminus
Location
- Location within Apulia Location within Italy

Taranto railway station (Italian: Stazione di Taranto) is the main station serving the city and comune of Taranto, in the region of Apulia, southern Italy. Opened in 1868, it forms a junction between three main lines, from Bari, Brindisi and Reggio di Calabria, respectively. It is also a terminus of a secondary line, the Bari–Martina Franca–Taranto railway.

The station is currently managed by Rete Ferroviaria Italiana (RFI). However, the commercial area of the passenger building is managed by Centostazioni. The station's main line train services are operated by or on behalf of Trenitalia. Each of these companies is a subsidiary of Ferrovie dello Stato (FS), Italy's state-owned rail company.

Regional train services on the Bari–Martina Franca–Taranto railway are operated by Ferrovie del Sud Est (FSE).

== Location ==
Taranto railway station is situated at Piazza della Libertà, at the end of Via Duca d'Aosta. It is a short distance to the north west of the Ponte di Porta Napoli, the bridge over the natural channel between Taranto's Mar Grande and its Mar Piccolo.

The station is linked with the city centre by a combination of the Ponte di Porta Napoli, the Isola del Borgo Antico, and the Ponte di San Francesco di Paola, or Ponte Girevole (English: Swing Bridge), a well known symbol of Taranto. The latter bridge spans the artificial channel between the Mar Grande and the Mar Piccolo.

== History ==
The station was opened on 15 September 1868, upon the inauguration of the Gioia del Colle–Taranto section of the Bari–Taranto railway.

On 28 February 1869, Taranto was also connected with Metaponto, as the Società per le Strade Ferrate Meridionali (English: Company for the Southern Railways, SFM) had initiated the construction of the Jonica railway (Taranto–Reggio di Calabria). On the same day, a connection between the station and the Port of Taranto was opened, as was the first section of the Battipaglia–Potenza–Metaponto railway that, once completed, would open the then-important rail link to Salerno and Naples.

In 1886, the Società per le Strade Ferrate del Mediterraneo (English: Mediterranean Railway Company) opened the Taranto–Brindisi railway. When finished, it would secure the faster and safer rail connection between these two major railway stations and port locations. From that point onwards, Taranto station was shared by two railway administrations, Rete Adriatica and Rete Mediterranea.

Until the late nineteenth century, Taranto was an important railway junction for traffic in foodstuffs and timber from Calabria and Sicily to the Adriatic and the north. Its importance waned after the opening of the Southern Tyrrhenian railway, which diverted most of this traffic via Salerno and Naples.

The establishment of the Ferrovie del Sud Est (FSE) in 1931 created an additional source of regional traffic, via Martina Franca.

== Features ==
The design of the passenger building is influenced by architectural styles that were in vogue in the mid-nineteenth century. It therefore consists of a two-storey central structure with a central clock tower, and two wings extending laterally for form one elevation.

== Services ==
As of the June 2025 timetable change, the following services stop at Taranto:

- Frecciarossa: high-speed service to Milano Centrale.
- InterCity#Italy: daytime and nighttime service to Milan, Roma Termini, Lecce, and Reggio di Calabria Centrale.
- Regionale: local service to Bari Centrale, Potenza Centrale, Brindisi, and Martina Franca.

== Interchange ==
Local buses link the Piazza della Libertà, outside the station, with the city centre.

== See also ==
- History of rail transport in Italy
- List of railway stations in Apulia
- Rail transport in Italy
- Railway stations in Italy
