= Eleanor =

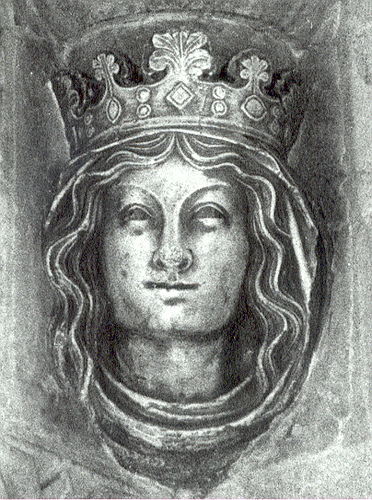
- Queen Eleanor of Provence
- Pronunciation: /ˈɛlənər, -nɔːr/
- Gender: Female
- Language: French and English

Origin
- Derivation: Derived from the Latin phrase "alia Aenor" through the Provençal name Aliénor
- Meaning: The other Aenor
- Region of origin: Southern France

Other names
- Variant forms: Eleonore, Eleanora, Eleonora, Eléonore, Elanor, Elinor (see Variants section)
- Nicknames: Nora, Ella, Ellie, Elle, El, Nell, Nellie, Nelly

Eleanor (/ˈɛlənər, -nɔːr/) is a feminine given name, originally from an Old French adaptation of the Old Provençal name Aliénor. It was the name of a number of women of royalty and nobility in western Europe during the High Middle Ages. The name was introduced to England by Eleanor of Aquitaine, who came to marry King Henry II. It was also borne by Eleanor of Provence, who became queen consort of England as the wife of King Henry III, and Eleanor of Castile, wife of Edward I.

The name was popular in the Anglosphere during the first half of the 20th century, but declined in use until the late 20th century and first decades of the 21st century. It has been a well-used name in the United States, Canada, the United Kingdom, Australia and New Zealand during the 2020s. Eleanor was the third most popular name for newborn girls born to white mothers in the U.S. state of Virginia in 2024, but was a less popular name for girls born to mothers from other groups. Eleanor was the ninth most popular name overall for newborn girls in Virginia in 2024.

Eleanor Roosevelt, the longest-serving first lady of the U.S., was probably the most famous bearer of the name in contemporary history.

Spelling variants include Elanor, Eleonore, Elinor, Ellenor and others. A common variant is Eleonora/Eleanora. Common hypocorisms include Eleana, Elle, Ella, Ellie, Elly, Leonor, Leonora, Leonore, Nell, Nella, Nellie, Nelly, and Nora.

== Origin ==
The name derives from the Provençal name Aliénor, which became Éléonore in Langue d'oïl, i.e., French, and from there Eleanor in English.

The origin of the name is somewhat unclear; one of the earliest bearers appears to have been Eleanor of Aquitaine (1120s–1204). She was the daughter of Aénor de Châtellerault, and it has been suggested that having been baptized Aenor after her mother, she was called alia Aenor, i.e. "the other Aenor" or Aliénor in childhood and would have kept that name in adult life. Some sources say that the name Aénor itself may be a Latinization of an unknown Germanic name.

Eleanor of Aquitaine, the most powerful woman in 12th century Europe, was certainly the reason for the name's later popularity. However, the name's origin with her, and the explanation of alia Aenor is uncertain; there are records of possible bearers of the name Alienor earlier in the 12th, or even in the 11th or 10th centuries, but the records of these women post-date Eleanor of Aquitaine, at a time when Alienor had come to be seen as an equivalent variant of the name Aenor (so that presumably, these women during their own lifetime used the given name Aenor):

1. Alienor, wife (b. 899) (married 935) of Aimery II, Viscount of Thouars, and mother of Herbert I (born 960).
2. Aleanor de Thouars (1050–1088/93), grandmother of Aénor of Châtellerault, and thus Eleanor of Aquitaine's great-grandmother. Born c. 1060 as a daughter of Aimery IV of Thouars and Aurengarde de Mauleon. Her name is also cited in some documents as Adenor, Aenors and Aleanor/Alienor, and may have been corrupted to Alienor in genealogies only after the 12th century.
3. Eleanor of Normandy, aunt of William the Conqueror, was so named by the 17th-century genealogist Pierre de Guibours, but de Guibours' sources for this remain unknown. (Note: The first known source giving her name as Eleanor is apparently Pierre de Guibours (died 1694). De Guibours claims to base this on the authority of William of Jumièges, but the information is not actually found there, suggesting that de Guibours drew from another source which has not yet been identified.)
4. Eleanor of Champagne (1102–1147), in 1125 became the first wife of Ralph I, Count of Vermandois, who was displaced by Eleanor of Aquitaine's sister Petronilla of Aquitaine, leading to war (1142–44) in Champagne.

== Variants ==
- Breton: Azenor
- Catalan: Elionor
- Czech: Eleonora, Eleanor, Eleonor
- Danish: Ellinor, Leonora
- Dutch, Polish, Latvian: Eleonora
- English: Eleanor, Elinor
- Estonian: Eleonoora, Ellinor
- Finnish: Eleonora, Eleonoora, Elli, Leonora, Noora, Nora
- French: Eléonore, Éléonore, Léonore, Elléonore, Eléanor, Éléanor, Éléanore, Aliénor, Aénor
- German: Eleonore
- Greek: Ελεονώρα
- Hungarian, Slovak: Eleonóra
- Indonesian: Eleanor, Eleonora, Leonora
- Irish: Eileanóra, Elienor
- Italian: Eleonora, Leonora
- Occitan: Alienor, Alienòr
- Portuguese: Leonora, Leonor
- Provençal: Lenoa, Leno
- Spanish: Leonor
- Swedish: Eleanora, Ellinor, Elleonore, Elna
- Turkish: Elanur
- Welsh: Elinor

== Notable people ==
=== People with the given name Eleanor ===
==== Medieval ====
- Eleanor of Alburquerque (1374–1435), Castilian noblewoman, Countess of Alburquerque and wife of Ferdinand I of Aragon
- Eleanor of Anjou (1289–1341), daughter of Charles II of Naples and Mary of Hungary, and wife of Frederick III of Sicily
- Eleanor of Aquitaine (c. 1122–1204), wife of Louis VII of France and Henry II of England, mother of Richard I and King John
- Eleanor of Aragon, Queen of Castile (1358–1382), wife of John I of Castile
- Eleanor of Aragon, Queen of Cyprus (1333–1417), wife of Peter I of Cyprus
- Eleanor of Aragon, Queen of Portugal (1402–1445), wife of Edward I of Portugal
- Eleanor of Arborea (1347–1404), Sardinian judge
- Eleanor of Austria (1498–1558), Queen consort of Portugal (1516–1521) and of France (1530–1547)
- Eleanor of Brittany (abbess) (1285–1342), granddaughter of Eleanor of Provence and Henry III, and later Abbess of Fontevraud
- Eleanor of Castile (1307–1359), wife of Alfonso IV of Aragon
- Eleanor of Castile (1202–1244), wife of James I of Aragon
- Eleanor of Castile (1241–1290), wife of Edward I of England, mother of Edward II
- Eleanor of Castile (died 1416), wife of Charles III of Navarre
- Eleanor of Champagne (1102–1147), wife of Ralph I, Count of Vermandois
- Eleanor of England, Countess of Leicester (1215–1275), daughter of King John of England, wife of Simon de Montfort, 6th Earl of Leicester
- Eleanor of England, Countess of Bar (1269–1298), daughter of Edward I, betrothed to Alfonso III of Aragon, and wife of Henry III of Bar
- Eleanor of England, Queen of Castile (1161–1214), daughter of Henry II of England and Eleanor of Aquitaine; wife of Alfonso VIII of Castile
- Eleanor of Lancaster (1318–1372), Lady Beaumont and Countess of Arundel
- Eleanor of Naples (1450–1493), wife of Ercole I d'Este, Duke of Ferrara
- Eleanor of Navarre (1426–1479), wife of Gaston IV, Count of Foix
- Eleanor of Normandy (b. 1011/1013, d. after 1071), daughter of Richard II of Normandy
- Eleanor of Portugal, Holy Roman Empress (1434–1467), wife of Frederick III, Holy Roman Emperor
- Eleanor of Portugal, Queen of Denmark (1211–1231), Portuguese infanta and wife of Valdemar the Young
- Eleanor of Provence (1222–1291), wife of Henry III of England, mother of Edward I
- Eleanor of Scotland (1433–1480), wife of Sigismund, Archduke of Austria
- Eleanor of Sicily (1349–1375), wife of Peter IV of Aragon
- Eleanor of Toledo (1522–1562), Spanish noblewoman and Duchess and Regent of Florence (1539)
- Eleanor of Viseu (1458–1525), wife of John II of Portugal
- Eleanor of Woodstock (1318–1355), daughter of Edward II, wife of Reynold II, Count of Gelderland
- Eleanor Butler, Countess of Desmond (c. 1545 – 1636), wife of Gerald FitzGerald
- Eleanor Clifford, Countess of Cumberland (1519–1547), wife of Henry Clifford, 2nd Earl of Cumberland
- Eleanor de Bohun (1366–1399), Duchess of Gloucester, Duchess of Aumale, Countess of Buckingham and Countess of Essex
- Eleanor de Bohun (1304– 1363), Countess of Ormonde
- Eleanor de Clare (1292–1337), granddaughter of Edward I of England and wife of Hugh Despenser the Younger
- Eleanor de Guzmán (1310–1351), Castilian noblewoman and mistress of Alfonso XI of Castile
- Eleanor de' Medici (1567–1611), Duchess of Mantua by marriage to Vincenzo I Gonzaga
- Eleanor de Montfort (1252–1282), Princess of Wales and Lady of Snowdon, wife of Llywelyn ap Gruffudd
- Eleanor, Countess of Vermandois (c. 1149–1213)
- Eleanor, Duchess of Gloucester (1400–1452), mistress and then second wife of Humphrey, Duke of Gloucester, sentenced to life imprisonment for treasonable necromancy
- Eleanor, Fair Maid of Brittany (1184–1241), daughter of Geoffrey, Duke of Brittany
- Eleanor FitzAlan (c. 1284 – July/August 1328), wife of Henry de Percy, 1st Baron Percy
- Eleanor Holland, Countess of Salisbury (1386 – after 1413), wife of Thomas Montagu, 4th Earl of Salisbury
- John/Eleanor Rykener, a 14th-century (possibly transgender) prostitute

==== Modern ====
- Eleanor Hallowell Abbott (1872–1958), American author
- Eleanor Abrams (1885–1967), American painter
- Eleanor D. Acheson, American lawyer
- Eleanor Acland (1878–1933), British Liberal Party politician
- Eleanor R. Adair (1926–2013), American scientist
- Eleanor Adviento (born 1995), New Zealand curler
- Eleanor E. Ahlers (1911–1997), American teacher and librarian
- Eleanor Alberga (born 1949), Jamaican contemporary music composer
- Eleanor Jane Alexander (1857–1939), poet and novelist
- Eleanor Allan (born 1937), Scottish lawn bowler
- Eleanor Aller (1917–1995), American cellist
- Eleanor Ames, known as Eleanor Kirk (1831–1908), American author, businesswoman, newspaper publisher, and suffragist
- Eleanor Antin (born 1935), American artist and filmmaker
- Eleanor Arnason (born 1942), American writer of science fiction novels and short stories
- Eleanor Stackhouse Atkinson (1863–1942), American novelist
- Eleanor Audley (1905–1991), American actress
- Eleanor Southey Baker McLaglan (1879–1969), New Zealand doctor
- Eleanor Baldwin Cass (1874–1966), American fencer
- Eleanor Cunningham Bannister (1858–1939), American portrait painter
- Eleanor Barnes, British physician
- Eleanor Barooshian (1950–2016), American musician
- Eleanor Barraclough, British cultural historian and writer
- Eleanor Barton (1872–1960), British co-operative movement activist
- Eleanor Bauer, American choreographer and dancer
- Eleanor K. Baum, American electrical engineer
- Eleanor Beardsley, French society, politics, economics, culture, history, business affairs, sport and gastronomy for National Public Radio
- Eleanor Begtang (born 1964), Filipino politician
- Eleanor Robson Belmont (1879–1979), English actress
- Eleanor Marion Bennett (born 1942), Australian botanist
- Eleanor Bergstein (born 1938), American screenwriter
- Eleanor Berwick (born 1943), English retired vintner
- Eleanor Best, British painter
- Eleanor Bezzina (born 1977), Maltese sports shooter
- Eleanor Bisbee (1893–1956), American writer
- Eleanor Bishop, New Zealand stage director, producer and playwright
- Eleanor Blackmore (1873–1943), British baptist missionary
- Eleanor Taylor Bland (1944–2010), African-American writer
- Eleanor Blevins (1894–1973), early American actress
- Eleanor Albert Bliss (1899–1987), American bacteriologist
- Eleanor Boardman (1898–1991), American actress
- Eleanor Bodel (born 1948), Swedish singer
- Eleanor Bond (born 1948), Canadian artist and art educator
- Eleanor Bontecou (1891–1976), American lawyer
- Eleanor Bor (1898–1957), British writer
- Eleanor Elizabeth Bourne (1878–1957), Australian medical doctor
- Eleanor Vere Boyle (1825–1916), British artist
- Eleanor Hoyt Brainerd (1868–1942), American writer
- Eleanor Brass (1905–1992), Canadian writer
- Eleanor Bron (born 1938), British actress and author
- Eleanor Brown (born 1973), American novelist
- Eleanor Brown (footballer) (born 2000), Australian rules footballer
- Eleanor Gertrude Brown (c. 1888–1964), American Milton scholar and educator
- Eleanor Bufton (1842–1893), Welsh actress
- Eleanor Alice Burford (1906–1993), English author
- Eleanor Burnham, Welsh Liberal Democratic politician
- Eleanor Burns (born 1945), American quilter
- Eleanor Howard, Countess of Wicklow (1914–1997), Irish architect and politician
- Eleanor Caines (1880–1913), American actress
- Eleanor Calbes (1940–2016), Filipina soprano
- Eleanor Harper Caldwell, American film editor
- Eleanor Callow (1927–1974), Canadian baseball player
- Eleanor Jane Taylor Calverley, American medical missionary
- Eleanor Cameron (1912–1996), Canadian-American children's writer
- Eleanor Campbell, several people
- Eleanor Cardozo (born 1965), British sculptor
- Eleanor Cardwell (born 1994), English netball player
- Eleanor Carey (1852–1915), American actress
- Eleanor Carothers (1882–1957), American zoologist, geneticist and cytologist
- Eleanor Kearny Carr (1840–1912), American political hostess
- Eleanor Darnall Carroll (1703–1796), American heiress
- Eleanor Cassar (born 1982), Maltese singer
- Eleanor Catton (born 1985), New Zealand novelist and screenwriter
- Eleanor McWilliams Chamberlain, American women's rights activist
- Eleanor Barrow Chase (1918–2002), American social worker and civic leader
- Eleanor Chávez (born 1953), American politician
- Eleanor Chesnut (1868–1905), American Christian medical missionary and translator who worked in China
- Eleanor Stuart Childs (1872–1952), American novelist
- Eleanor Clift (born 1940), American political journalist
- Eleanor Clitheroe (born 1954), Canadian cleric and former businesswoman
- Eleanor Clymer (1906–2001), American writer
- Eleanor Coade (1733–1821), British businesswoman
- Eleanor Coen (1916–2010), American painter
- Eleanor Coerr (1922–2010), Canadian-American writer
- Eleanor Gwinnell Coit (1894–1976), American suffragist
- Eleanor Coleman (1905–1978), American swimmer
- Eleanor Collins (1919–2024), Canadian jazz singer and television host
- Eleanor Gladys Copenhaver (1896–1985), American social worker and activist
- Eleanor Coppola (1936–2024), American documentary filmmaker
- Eleanor Cory (born 1943), American composer
- Eleanor Creesy, American navigator
- Eleanor Cullis-Hill (1913–2001), Australian architect
- Eleanor P. Cushing (1856–1925), American mathematics professor
- Eleanor Parke Custis, multiple people
- Eleanor Dale (born 2002), English footballer
- Eleanor "Sis" Daley (1907–2003), wife of former Chicago mayor Richard J. Daley
- Eleanor Daley (composer) (born 1955), Canadian musician
- Eleanor Daniels (1886–1994), Welsh actress and singer
- Eleanor Dapkus (1923–2011), American baseball player
- Eleanor Dark (1901–1985), Australian novelist
- Eleanor David (born 1955), English actress
- Eleanor Davies, multiple people
- Eleanor Davies-Colley (1874–1934), British surgeon
- Eleanor Davis (born 1983), American cartoonist and illustrator
- Eleanor Layfield Davis (1911–1985), American painter
- Eleanor Dickey (born 1967), American classicist, linguist and academic
- Eleanor Lausch Dietrich (1912–2001), American opera singer
- Eleanor Widener Dixon (1891–1966), American socialite and philanthropist
- Eleanor Dodson, Australian biologist
- Eleanor C. Donnelly (1838–1917), American poet
- Eleanor Doorly (1880–1950), British children's writer
- Eleanor Duckett (1880–1976), English-born philologist and medieval historian
- Eleanor Duckworth (born 1935), Canadian psychologist and educator
- Eleanor Lyon Duke (1918–2013), American biologist
- Eleanor Lansing Dulles (1895–1996), American economist and diplomat
- Eleanor Dumont (c. 1829–1879), American gambler
- Eleanor Eden (1777–1851), Countess of Buckinghamshire
- Eleanor Franklin Egan (1879–1925), American singer-songwriter
- Eleanor Joan Ellis, British artist
- Eleanor Emery (1918–2007), British diplomat
- Eleanor Epke (born 1998), English-born New Zealand squash player
- Eleanor Espling, American politician
- Eleanor Estes (1906–1988), American children's writer
- Eleanor Evans (1893–1969), British singer, actress and stage director
- Eleanor Boyle Ewing Sherman (1824–1888), American author
- Eleanor Farnes, British writer
- Eleanor Farjeon (1881–1965), British writer
- Eleanor Fazan (1929–2024), British choreographer and actress
- Eleanor Feingold, American statistical geneticist
- Eleanor Fish, British immunologist
- Eleanor Fitchen (1912–2009), American conservationist
- Eleanor Fitzgerald (1877–1955), American editor and theatre professional
- Eleanor Flexner (1908–1995), American independent scholar and pioneer
- Eleanor Sherman Font (1896–1982), American iconographer
- Eleanor Foraker (1930–2011), American seamstress
- Eleanor Fortescue-Brickdale (1872–1945), British artist
- Eleanor Fortson (1904–1997), American politician
- Eleanor Woolley Fowler (1907–1987), American peace worker
- Eleanor M. Fox, American legal scholar
- Eleanor Ison Franklin, American endocrinologist
- Eleanor Everest Freer (1864–1942), American composer and philanthropist
- Eleanor French (1915–1975), American singer
- Eleanor Fried (1891–1965), American screenwriter
- Eleanor Friedberger (born 1976), American musician
- Eleanor Gamble (1868–1933), psychologist
- Eleanor Garatti (1909–1998), American swimmer
- Eleanor Garrison, activist and organizer
- Eleanor Gates (1875–1951), American playwright
- Eleanor Gehrig (1904–1984), American philanthropist
- Eleanor Churchill Gibbs (1840–1925), American educator
- Eleanor J. Gibson (1910–2002), American psychologist and academic
- Eleanor Givens (born 1989), English professional golfer
- Eleanor Glanville (1654–1709), English entomologist and naturalist
- Eleanor Glencross (1876–1950), Australian feminist
- Eleanor Glueck (1898–1972), American social worker and criminologist
- Eleanor Glynn (born 1986), English model and beauty pageant titleholder
- Eleanor Goodman, American poet, writer and translator
- Eleanor Goodrich (1888–1978), British politician and activist
- Eleanor Gordon (1852–1942), American Unitarian minister
- Eleanor Goss (1895–1982), American tennis player
- Eleanor Lilian Gladys Gough (1887–1967), Australian dressmaker
- Eleanor Graham (1896–1984), British book editor and children's book author
- Eleanor Greatorex (1853–1908), American painter
- Eleanor Margaret Green (1895–1966), Princess Viggo, Countess of Rosenborg
- Eleanor Greenwood, Australian mezzo-soprano
- Eleanor Gribble (1883–1960), British artist
- Eleanor Grove (1826–1905), British translator and educator
- Eleanor Gudger, English poker player
- Eleanor Gwynn (known colloquially as "Nell") (1650–1687), Restoration actress and mistress of Charles II of England
- Eleanor Hadley (1916–2007), American economist
- Eleanor Hague (1875–1954), American folklorist
- Eleanor Hall, Australian journalist and presenter
- Eleanor Prescott Hammond (1866–1933), Chaucer scholar
- Eleanor Humes Haney (1931–1999), American feminist theologian
- Eleanor Harding (1934–1996), Australian Aboriginal activist
- Eleanor Hardwick, British artist, photographer and curator
- Eleanor Hartill (born 2000), Australian rules footballer
- Eleanor Harvey (born 1995), Canadian Olympic fencer
- Eleanor Jones Harvey (born 1960), American museum curator
- Eleanor Haslam (born 1939), Canadian sprinter
- Eleanor Heartney (born 1954), American art critic
- Eleanor Heeps (born 2003), English footballer
- Eleanor F. Helin (1932–2009), American astronomer
- Eleanor Helin (1932–2009), American astronomer
- Eleanor Krohn Herrmann (1935–2012), American nurse educator
- Eleanor Hibbert (1906–1993), British novelist
- Eleanor Higginson (1881–1969), British suffragette
- Eleanor J. Hill (born 1950), American government official
- Eleanor Hilowitz, American painter
- Eleanor Himmelfarb (1910–2009), American painter, educator and conservationist
- Eleanor Hinder (1893–1963), Australian welfare officer
- Eleanor Holm (1912–2004), American competition swimmer
- Eleanor Holmes Norton (born 1937), American politician
- Eleanor Holroyd, New Zealand nursing academic
- Eleanor Honnywill (c. 1919–2003), British Antarctic researcher
- Eleanor Mollie Horadam (1921–2002), English-Australian mathematician
- Eleanor M. Hosley (1906–1997), American social worker
- Eleanor Hovda (1940–2009), American classical composer
- Eleanor Hughes (1882–1959), New Zealand-born British landscape artist
- Eleanor Hull (1860–1935), English writer, journalist and scholar of Old Irish
- Eleanor Hunt (1910–1981), American actress
- Eleanor Post Hutton (1909–2006), American heiress, art collector and socialite
- Eleanor Ireland (1926–2020), British computer scientist
- Eleanor James (born 1986), British actress
- Eleanor Janega, American broadcaster and medievalist
- Eleanor Jarman (1901–?), American fugitive
- Eleanor Joachim, New Zealand bookbinder
- Eleanor Johnson, multiple people
- Eleanor Jones (1929–2021), American mathematician
- Eleanor Jordan, American politician
- Eleanor Jorden (1920–2009), American linguist and Japanese language educator
- Eleanor Josaitis (1931–2011), American civil rights activist
- Eleanor Jourdain (1863–1924), British academic
- Eleanor Kasrils (1936–2009), Scottish-South African anti-apartheid activist
- Eleanor Keaton (1918–1998), American dancer and variety show performer
- Eleanor Mercein Kelly (1880–1968), American writer
- Eleanor Kieliszek (1925–2017), American politician
- Eleanor Campbell King (1906–1991), American modern dancer and choreographer
- Eleanor Warwick King (born 1957), British appellate court judge
- Eleanor King (1906–1991), American dancer
- Eleanor Talbot Kinkead, American novelist
- Eleanor Kinnaird (born 1931), American politician
- Eleanor Kirk (1831–1908), American author, businesswoman, newspaper publisher, and suffragist
- Eleanor Kish (1924–2014), American artist
- Eleanor Knott (1886–1975), Irish scholar, academic and lexicographer
- Eleanor Knowles (1932–2010), American author and editor
- Eleanor Krawitz Kolchin (1927–2019), American mathematician, computer programmer, author and teacher
- Eleanor La Mance (1898–1985), American singer
- Eleanor Laing (born 1958), British politician
- Eleanor de Laittre (1911–1998), American artist
- Eleanor Lambert (1903–2003), American fashion publicist
- Eleanor Lambert (cricketer), South African cricketer
- Eleanor Annie Lamson (1875–1932), astronomer
- Eleanor Larosa (born 2005), Australian cricketer
- Eleanor Frances Lattimore (1904–1986), American author and illustrator
- Eleanor Larrabee Lattimore (1874–1966), American sociologist
- Eleanor Mary Ord Laurie (1919–2009), British mammalogist
- Eleanor Lay, British publisher and print-seller
- Eleanor Lazarovich-Hrebelianovich (1862–1957), American actress
- Eleanor Winsor Leach (1937–2018), American classical scholar
- Eleanor Leacock (1922–1987), American anthropologist
- Eleanor Edwards Ledbetter, American librarian
- Eleanor Lee (born 1999), Singaporean actress, singer and model
- Eleanor Lee (politician) (1931–2025), American politician
- Eleanor Agnes Lee (1841–1873), diarist, poet, and daughter of Robert E. Lee
- Eleanor Percy Lee, American writer
- Eleanor Lerman, American writer
- Eleanor Lodge (1869–1936), British academic
- Eleanor Merriam Lukits, American painter
- Eleanor Lynn (1916–1996), American actress
- Eleanor Lyons, British political consultant
- Eleanor Maccoby (1917–2018), American psychologist
- Eleanor Josephine Macdonald (1906–2007), American university teacher
- Eleanor MacKinnon (1871–1936), Red Cross leader
- Eleanor Macomber (1801–1840), missionary, teacher
- Eleanor Madison (1731–1829), mother of James Madison Jr.
- Eleanor Maguire (1970–2025), Irish neuroscientist
- Eleanor L. Makel (1914–1992), American medical doctor and government official
- Eleanor Manning (1906–1986), Australian military officer
- Eleanor Mariano, United States admiral and physician
- Eleanor Maroes (1943–2017), Canadian politician
- Eleanor Cross Marquand (1873–1950), American art historian
- Eleanor Martin (1951–2020), Australian dancer
- Eleanor Marx (1855–1898), British writer and daughter of Karl Marx
- Eleanor Matsuura (born 1983), British-Japanese actress
- Eleanor Maurice, American painter
- Eleanor Mayo (1920–1981), American politician
- Eleanor Wilson McAdoo (1889–1967), American author and the youngest daughter of United States President Woodrow Wilson
- Eleanor McClatchy (1895–1980), American newspaper executive
- Eleanor McClintock (1902–1992), American scientist and cytogeneticist
- Eleanor McEvoy (born 1967), Irish musician, singer/songwriter
- Eleanor McFadden, Irish tennis player
- Eleanor McGovern (1921–2007), spouse of American politician
- Eleanor McKenzie (born 1931), Canadian sprinter
- Eleanor Southey Baker McLaglan (1879–1969), New Zealander medical doctor
- Eleanor McLaughlin (born 1938), Scottish politician
- Eleanor McMahon, Canadian politician
- Eleanor McMain (1868–1934), American settlement house worker and progressive reformer
- Eleanor Mears (1917–1992), Scottish medical practitioner and campaigner
- Eleanor Mary Mellon, American sculptor
- Eleanor Merry, British anthropologist
- Eleanor Millard (born 1942), Canadian politician
- Eleanor Miller (1868–1943), California politician
- Eleanor Milleville, American sculptor
- Eleanor Mills (journalist), British journalist
- Eleanor Milne (1925–2014), Canadian sculptor
- Eleanor Modrakowska (1879–1955), American painter
- Eleanor Mondale, American actress, infotainer, television personality
- Eleanor Montague (1926–2018), American radiologist and educator who established breast-conserving therapy in the United States
- Eleanor Montgomery (1946–2013), American high jumper
- Eleanor Allen Moore (1885–1955), Scottish-Irish painter
- Eleanor Hiestand Moore (1859–1923), American physician and suffragist
- Eleanor May Moore (1875–1949), Australian pacifist
- Eleanor Moore (1933–2022), American baseball player
- Eleanor Morton, multiple people
- Eleanor Mosley (born 1700, date of death unknown), English milliner and businesswoman
- Eleanor Moty, American metal smith and jewelry artist
- Eleanor Munro (1928–2022), American art critic, art historian, writer, and editor
- Eleanor Murray, British-Canadian epidemiologist
- Eleanor Myers (1925–1996), American archaeologist
- Eleanor Myerson, American politician
- Eleanor Nabwiso, Ugandan actress, producer, director and television personality
- Eleanor Nathan, British politician
- Eleanor Nesbitt, British Punjabi scholar
- Eleanor Legasto Nishiumi, known as Ellen Nishiumi (born 1966), Filipino television personality
- Eleanor Nisperos, American lawyer
- Eleanor Noble (born 1980), Canadian actress
- Eleanor Norcross (1854–1923), American painter
- Eleanor Norrie, Canadian politician
- Eleanor Nwadinobi, Nigerian medical doctor and women's health activist
- Eleanor O'Byrne (1896–1987), American Catholic nun
- Eleanor Manning O'Connor (1884–1973), American architect
- Eleanor O'Donnell (born 1998), Scottish badminton player
- Eleanor Oldroyd (born 1962), British radio broadcaster
- Eleanor Olszewski, Canadian politician
- Eleanor O'Meara (died 2000), Canadian figure skater
- Eleanor E. Orlebar (1841–1906), English writer
- Eleanor Anne Ormerod (1828–1901), British entomologist
- Eleanor Ostman, American food writer
- Eleanor Owen (1921–2022), also known as Eleanor DeVito, American journalist, playwright, university professor, costume designer, theatre actress, and mental health professional
- Eleanor Pairman (1896–1973), Scottish mathematician
- Eleanor Pam (born 1936), American political activist
- Eleanor Parker (historian), British historian
- Eleanor Parker (1922–2013), American actress
- Eleanor Patterson (born 1996), Australian track and field athlete who competes in the high jump
- Eleanor Pepper (1904–1997), American interior designer
- Eleanor Perenyi (1918–2009), American gardener and author
- Eleanor Perry (1914–1981), American screenwriter
- Eleanor Phelps (1907–2001), American actress
- Eleanor Addison Phillips (1874–1952), English educationist and founder of the first UK Soroptimist movement, the Venture Club
- Eleanor Jackson Piel (1920–2022), American civil rights lawyer
- Eleanor Piggott (born 1991), British rower
- Eleanor Pike (1855–1933), English animal welfare and vegetarianism activist
- Eleanor Pilgrim (born 1977), Welsh professional golfer
- Eleanor Bellows Pillsbury (1913–1971), American activist
- Eleanor Platt, American sculptor
- Eleanor Anne Porden (1795–1825), English poet
- Eleanor H. Porter (1868–1920), American novelist
- Eleanor Porter (1868–1920), American novelist
- Eleanor Powell (1912–1982), American tap dancer and actress
- Eleanor C. Pressly (1918–2003), American mathematician and aeronautical engineer
- Eleanor Prosser, American theater historian
- Eleanor Race (born 1970), American field hockey player
- Eleanor Ragsdale (1926–1998), American civil rights activist
- Eleanor Raskin (born 1946), American lawyer
- Eleanor Rathbone (1872–1946), British politician
- Eleanor Ray, American artist
- Eleanor Raymond (1887–1989), American architect
- Eleanor Rees (born 1978), British poet
- Eleanor Reeves (born 1980), British politician
- Eleanor Mary Reid (1860–1953), British paleobotanist
- Eleanor Reissa, American dramatist
- Eleanor Richardson (born 1986), Scottish cyclist
- Eleanor Rieffel, American mathematician
- Eleanor Riese (1943–1991), American patient
- Eleanor Riley, Scottish academic
- Eleanor Robinson (born 1947), British former ultramarathon runner
- Eleanor Robson, British academic
- Eleanor Butler Roosevelt (1888–1960), American philanthropist
- Eleanor Roosevelt (1884–1962), First Lady of U.S., wife of President Franklin Roosevelt
- Eleanor Rosch (born 1938), American psychologist
- Eleanor L. Ross (born 1967), American judge
- Eleanor Rudall (1881–1960), English composer and pianist
- Eleanor Ruggles (1916–2008), American biographer
- Eleanor Ryan-Doyle (born 1998), Irish professional footballer
- Eleanor Saffran (1938–2002), American psychologist
- Eleanor Seely Salmon (1910–1984), American geologist
- Eleanor Sanderson, English Anglican bishop
- Eleanor Sato, American politician
- Eleanor Saukerson (1922–2005), American politician
- Eleanor Sayre (1916–2001), American curator and art historian
- Eleanor Schano (1932–2020), American journalist
- Eleanor Schill (1904–2005), English medical doctor
- Eleanor Schofield (born 1980), English chemist and consultant
- Eleanor Scoones (1981–2023), English television director and producer
- Eleanor Scott (born 1951), Scottish politician and medical doctor
- Eleanor Scott (archaeologist) (born 1960), British archaeologist
- Eleanor Roosevelt Seagraves (born 1927), American librarian, educator, historian, and editor
- Eleanor Searle (1908–2002), American independent woman
- Eleanor Mary Dennistoun Sellar (1829–1918), Scottish memoirist
- Eleanor Shanley, Irish Roots musician
- Eleanor Sharpston (born 1955), British lawyer
- Eleanor Shawcross, Baroness Shawcross-Wolfson (born 1983), British political advisor
- Eleanor Bernert Sheldon (1920–2021), American sociologist
- Eleanor Shelley-Rolls (1872–1961), British engineer
- Eleanor P. Sheppard (1907–1991), American civic activist and democratic politician
- Eleanor Mildred Sidgwick (1845–1936), British psychic researcher
- Eleanor Singer (1930–2017), Austrian-born American mathematician
- Eleanor Simmonds (born 1994), British former Paralympian swimmer
- Eleanor Clarke Slagle (1871–1942), American occupational therapist
- Eleanor Sleath (1770–1847), English novelist
- Eleanor Smart (born 1995), American high diver
- Eleanor Smeal (born 1939), American women's rights activist
- Eleanor Smith, several people
- Eleanor Sobel (born 1946), American politician
- Eleanor Sokoloff (1914–2020), American pianist and academic
- Eleanor Soltau (1877–1962), English doctor
- Eleanor Souray (1880–1931), English actress
- Eleanor Spence (1928–2008), Australian author
- Eleanor Spencer (1890–1973), American musician
- Eleanor Patterson Spencer (1895–1992), American art historian
- Eleanor Washington Spicer (1903–1974), American clubwoman and philanthropist
- Eleanor Spiess-Ferris (born 1941), American painter
- Eleanor Steber (1914–1990), American operatic soprano
- Eleanor Sterling (1960–2023), American biologist
- Eleanor Stewart (1913–2007), American film actress
- Eleanor Strevens (born 2006), British athlete
- Eleanor Stride, professor of biomaterials
- Eleanor Painter Strong (1885–1947), American opera singer
- Eleanor Summerfield (1921–2001), British actress
- Eleanor Tatlock (1769–1833), English poet
- Eleanor Taylor (born 1983), British comedian, television personality, actress, and writer
- Eleanor Ross Taylor (1920–2011), American poet
- Eleanor Tennant (1895–1974), tennis player and coach from the U.S.
- Eleanor Sherman Thackara, American philanthropist
- Eleanor Thom (born 1979), British writer
- Eleanor Thornton (1880–1915), British actress and model
- Eleanor Threlkeld (born 1998), English cricketer
- Eleanor Tiernan, Irish stand-up comedian, writer and actress
- Eleanor Tinsley (1926–2009), American city council and school board member
- Eleanor Joy Toll (1869–1926), American educator and clubwoman
- Eleanor Tomlinson (born 1992), English actress
- Eleanor Townsley, Australian-American academic, sociologist, and professor of sociology
- Eleanor Tufts (1927–1991), American art historian
- Eleanor Ty, Filipino-Canadian literary writer
- Eleanor Uhl (1902–1981), American swimmer
- Eleanor Updale (born 1953), British author
- Eleanor Vachell (1879–1948), Welsh botanist
- Eleanor Vadala (1923–2023), American chemist, materials engineer and balloonist
- Eleanor V. Valentin, American Navy admiral
- Eleanor Ardel Vietti (born 1927), American physician and missionary
- Eleanor Wachtel, Canadian writer and broadcaster
- Eleanor Wadsworth (1917–2020), English pilot and architect
- Eleanor Ward (1912–1984), American art dealer and gallery owner
- Eleanor Warren, multiple people
- Eleanor Weinstock (1929–2023), American politician
- Eleanor Torrey West (1913–2021), American historian
- Eleanor Whitney (1917–1983), American actress
- Eleanor Whittemore (1926–2022), American politician
- Eleanor Elkins Widener (c. 1862–1937), American heiress and philanthropist
- Eleanor Wigram (1767–1841), British philanthropist
- Eleanor Williams (born 2000), English criminal
- Eleanor Wilner (born 1937), American poet and editor
- Eleanor D. Wilson (1908–2002), American actress
- Eleanor Witcombe (1923–2018), Australian screenwriter
- Eleanor Wong, multiple people
- Eleanor Woodruff (1891–1980), American stage and silent screen actress
- Eleanor Worthington Cox (born 2001), English actress
- Eleanor Youmans (1876–1968), American women's children's novels, short stories and poetry
- Eleanor Young, multiple people
- Eleanor Yule, Scottish film director
- Eleanor Zaimis (1915–1982), British pharmacologist
- Eleanor Zelliot (1926–2016), American historian and author

=== People with the given name Eleanour ===
- Eleanour Sinclair Rohde (1881–1950), British garden designer

=== People with the given name Elenore ===
- Elenore Abbott (1875–1935), American painter and book illustrator
- Elenore Freedman (1926–2022), American educator
- Elenore Pepper (1924–2006), American field hockey player
- Elenore Sturko, Canadian politician

=== People with the given name Eleonore ===
- Eleonore of Austria, Queen of Poland (1653–1697), wife of firstly Michał Korybut Wiśniowiecki and secondly Charles V, Duke of Lorraine
- Fredrique Eleonore Baptiste (died 1827), Swedish stage actress and playwright
- Eleonore Batthyány-Strattmann (1672–1741), Viennese court lady
- Eleonore Baur (1885–1981), early member of the Nazi Party
- Catherine Éléonore Bénard (1740–1769), French lady-in-waiting
- Eléonore Bez (born 1976), French politician
- Eleonore Bjartveit (1924–2002), Norwegian politician
- Eleonore Büning (born 1952), German music journalist and writer
- Eleonore Caburet (born 2004), French rhythmic gymnast
- Eleonore Carboniers, Dutch poet
- Éléonore Caroit (born 1985), French politician
- Eleonore Cellard, French scholar
- Eleonore Dailly, American filmmaker
- Eleonore de Ahna (1838–1865), German operatic soprano/mezzo-soprano
- Éléonore Tenaille de Vaulabelle (1801–1859), French writer and playwright
- Éléonore-Aglaé-Marie Despierres (1843–1895), French historian
- Éléonore Duplay (1768–1832), French revolutionary
- Éléonore Faucher (1973–2023), French film director and screenwriter
- Éléonore Goldberg, French-Canadian writer and artist
- Ulrikke Eleonore Sigwardt Greve (1868–1951), Norwegian textile artist
- Eleonore Heerwart (1835–1911), German kindergarten teacher, educator and writer
- Eleonore Hendricks (born 1983), American actress, photographer and casting director
- Eleonore Hodys (1903–c. 1964), Austrian Auschwitz survivor
- Eleonore Hutzel (1884–1978), nurse and social worker in Detroit, Michigan
- Hyacinthe Eléonore Klosé (1808–1880), French clarinet player, professor, composer
- Eleonore Koch (1926–2018), German-born Brazilian painter and sculptor
- Éléonore Yayi Ladekan, Beninese politician
- Eléonore Denuelle de La Plaigne (1787–1868), French mistress of Emperor Napoleon I of France
- Éléonore Yayi Ladekan, Beninese politician and educator
- Éléonore Loiselle (born 2001), Canadian actress
- Eleonore Lundkvist (born 1988), Swedish politician
- Eleonore Marguerre (born 1978), German opera singer (coloratura soprano) with Belgic-French ancestors
- Eleonore Merza, anthropologist who studies Adygean diaspora communities in Israel and beyond
- Eleonore Noll-Hasenclever (1880–1925), German alpinist who mainly climbed in the Swiss Alps
- Eleonore Pameijer (born 1960), Dutch flute player
- Eleonore Pecanka (born 1956), Austrian field hockey player
- Eleonore Poelsleitner (1920–?), female guard at the Mauthausen concentration camp in Austria
- Eleonore Prochaska (1785–1813), German female soldier in the Prussian army against Napoleon
- Eleanor Ragsdale (1926–1998), American educator, entrepreneur, and activist
- Eleonore Schikaneder (1751–1821), Austrian stage actress and theatre manager
- Eleonore Schoenfeld (1925–2007), American musician
- Eleonore Schönborn (1920–2022), Austrian politician
- Eleonore Schönmaier, Canadian poet and fiction writer
- Eleonore Schwarz (born 1936), Austrian singer
- Éléonore Sioui (1920–2006), Wendat educator and activist in Canada
- Eleonore Staimer (1906–1998), German Communist Party activist and official
- Eleonore Stump (born 1947), American philosopher
- Eleonore Trefftz (1920–2017), German physicist
- Eléonore Vergeot (1820–1886), French mistress of Napoleon III
- Eleonore von Grothaus (1734–1794), German noblewoman, a writer and poet, and a lay musician
- Eleonore von Habsburg (born 1994), Austrian model
- Eleonore von Raab, Austrian collector of minerals
- Eleonore Weisgerber (born 1947), German television actress
- Luise Eleonore Wreech (1708–1784), Prussian noblewoman
- Eleanore Wurtzel (b.1954), American biologist

=== People with the given name Elinor ===
- Elinor Proby Adams (1885–1945), British oil painter, book illustrator and mural painter
- Elinor W. Ames, Canadian psychologist
- Elinor Armer (born 1939), American pianist, music educator and composer
- Elinor Barker (born 1994), Welsh road and track racing cyclist
- Elinor Bellingham-Smith (1906–1988), British painter of landscapes and still life
- Elinor Bennett (born 1943), Welsh harpist
- Elinor Black (1905–1982), Canadian obstetrician and gynaecologist
- Elinor Langton-Boyle, Hawaiian businesswoman and journalist
- Elinor Brent-Dyer (1894–1969), English writer of children's literature
- Elinor Burkett (born 1946), American journalist, author, film producer, and documentary director
- Elinor Burns (1887–1978), British communist, co-operative activist and suffragist
- Elinor Busby (born 1924), American science fiction writer and fanzine editor
- Elinor Byrns (c. 1876–1957), American lawyer
- Elinor Cahn (1925–2020), American photographer
- Elinor Caplan (born 1944), Canadian politician
- Elinor Carbone (born 1957), American politician
- Elinor Carucci (born 1971), Israeli-American photographer and educator
- Evelyn May Clowes, known by the pseudonym Elinor Mordaunt (1872–1942), English author, writer and traveller
- Elinor G. Constable (1934–2022), American diplomat
- Elinor Crawley (born 1991), Welsh actress
- Elinor Darwin (1879–1954), Irish-born illustrator, engraver and portrait painter
- Elinor DeWire (born 1953), American author, freelance writer, editor, public speaker, educator, and blogger based in Connecticut
- Elinor Donahue (born 1937), American actress
- Elinor Ewbank, English chemist and archaeologist
- Elinor Virginia Martin, known as Elinor Fair (1903–1957), American actress
- Elinor Ferry (1915–1993), American journalist
- Elinor Fettiplace, English cookery book writer
- Elinor Field (1902–1998), American film actress
- Elinor Freer, American pianist
- Elinor Frey (born 1979), Canadian-American cellist
- Elinor Fuchs (1933–2024), American theater scholar, critic and playwright
- Elinor Gadon (1925–2018), American cultural historian, Indologist, art historian and author
- Elinor Wight Gardner (1892–1980), geology lecturer at Bedford College, London and research fellow at Lady Margaret Hall
- Elinor S. Gimbel (1896–1983), American women's rights activist
- Elinor Glyn (1864–1943), British novelist
- Elinor Goldschmied (1910–2009), English educationalist
- Elinor Goodman (born 1946), UK journalist
- Elinor Miller Greenberg (1932–2021), American educationalist
- Elinor D. Gregg (1886–1970), American public nurse
- Elinor Guggenheimer (1912–2008), American civic leader, author and philanthropist
- Elinor Gwynn, Welsh poet and environmentalist
- Elinor Hallé (1856–1926), British sculptor and inventor
- Elinor Hammarskjöld (born 1967), Swedish lawyer and diplomat
- Elinor Hancock (1898–1942), American actress
- Elinor Harriot (1910–2000), American actress
- Elinor Rice Hays (1901–1994), American writer
- Elinor Raas Heller (1904–1987), American academic administrator
- Elinor Lander Horwitz (1929–2022), American author of young adult and adult books
- Elinor Mead Howells (1837–1910), American artist, architect and aristocrat
- Elinor Mullett Husselman (1900–1996), American Coptic scholar and papyrologist
- Elinor Jackson (1825–1854), first wife of Thomas J. "Stonewall" Jackson
- Elinor James (1644–1719), English writer
- Elinor Jenkins (1893–1920), British poet
- Elinor Joseph (born 1991), Israeli soldier
- Elinor Kershaw (1884–1971), American stage and motion-picture actress
- Elinor Macartney Lane (1864–1909), American novelist
- Elinor Langton-Boyle (1865–1946), American businesswoman
- Elinor Lawless (born 1983), Northern Irish actress
- Elinor Leigh, British stage actor of the seventeenth century
- Elinor Levin (born 1987), American politician
- Elinor Lipman (born 1950), American novelist, short story writer, and essayist
- Elinor Lyon (1921–2008), English children's author from a Scottish family background
- Elinor Mavor, editor of Amazing Stories and Fantastic from early 1979 until late 1981
- Elinor Middlemiss (born 1967), Scottish badminton player
- Elinor Mordaunt (1872–1942), English author and traveler
- Elinor Ochs, American linguistic anthropologist, and Distinguished Professor of Anthropology at University of California, Los Angeles
- Elinor Ostrom (1933–2012), American political scientist and Nobel prize winner
- Elinor Otto (1919–2023), American factory worker
- Elinor Philipps (1872–1965), English science educator and missionary
- Elinor Portnoy, Israeli-born glass artist based in London, England
- Elinor Powell, African-American nurse in World War II
- Elinor Ross (1926–2020), American opera singer
- Elinor Sauerwein (1914–2010), American philanthropist
- Elinor Schroeder, American lawyer
- Elinor Shaffer (born 1935), professor at the School of Advanced Study, University of London
- Elinor Sisulu (born 1958), South African writer and activist
- Elinor Smith (1911–2010), American aviator
- Elinor Sneshell, English barber-surgeon active during the reign of Elizabeth I of England
- Elinor Snowsill (born 1989), Welsh rugby union player
- Elinor Sullivan, American physiologist specializing in behavioural neuroscience
- Elinor Sweetman, Irish poet and author
- Elinor Tatum, American publisher
- Elinor Z. Taylor (1921–2010), American politician
- Elinor P. Thompson, British microbial and plant scientist
- Elinor Meissner Traeger (1906–1983), American composer, pianist, and writer
- Elinor Frances Vallentin (1873–1924), British botanist, author and botanical illustrator
- Elinor Remick Warren (1900–1991), American composer of contemporary classical music and pianist
- Elinor Whitney Field (1889–1980), American writer of children's books
- Elinor Wilson, president of Assisted Human Reproduction Canada between February 14, 2007, and September 30, 2012
- Elinor Wray (1899–1992), Australian speech therapist
- Elinor Wylie (1885–1928), American writer

=== People with the given name Elinore ===
- Elinore Blaisdell (1900–1994), American illustrator
- Elinore Denniston (1900–1978), American writer of more than 40 mystery novels under the pseudonym Rae Foley
- Elinore Johansson (born 1996), Swedish handball player
- Elinore Pruitt Stewart (1876–1933), American homesteader in Wyoming and memoirist
- Elinore Schöpp, former German curler

=== People with the given name Elleanor ===
- Elleanor Eldridge (c.1784-c.1845), African American/Native American entrepreneur

=== People with the given name Eleonora ===
- Eleonora Ernestina von Daun, Marquise of Pombal (1721–1789), second wife of Portuguese statesman Sebastião José de Carvalho e Melo, 1st Marquis of Pombal
- Eleonora Abbagnato (born 1978), Italian ballet dancer, model, and actress
- Eleonora Aguiari (born 1973), Italian installation artist and author
- Eleonora Alverà (born 1982), Italian curler
- Eleonora Alvisi (born 2003), Italian tennis player
- Eleonora Archaia (born 1967), Georgian politician
- Eleonora Armitage (1865–1961), British botanist and writer
- Eleonora Bargili, Italian pastellist active during the eighteenth century
- Eleonora Bechis (born 1974), Italian politician
- Eleonora Bentivoglio (1470–1540), Italian ruler, Lady of Sassuolo by marriage to Giberto III Pio di Savoia
- Eleonora Bergman (born 1947), Polish architectural historian who has worked on the preservation of Jewish heritage in Poland
- Eleonora Berlanda (born 1976), former Italian female middle-distance runner
- Eleonora Bilotta, Italian researcher into complex systems and human–computer interaction
- Eleonora Brigliadori (born 1960), Italian model, actress and television personality
- Eleonora Brown (born 1948), Italian film actress
- Eleonora Bruzual, Venezuelan writer and journalist
- Eleonora Buratto (born 1982), Italian soprano opera singer
- Eleonora Carrillo, Salvadoran model and beauty pageant titleholder
- Eleonora Cassano (born 1965), Argentine ballet dancer and teacher
- Eleonora Catsigeras (born 1956), Uruguayan mathematician
- Eleonora Cecchini (born 2003), Sammarinese footballer
- Eleonora Chiavarelli (1915–2010), Italian women and wife of Aldo Moro
- Eleonora Ciabocco (born 2004), Italian cyclist
- Eleonora de Cisneros (1878–1934), American opera singer
- Eleonora Cortini (born 1992), Italian Soubrette, model, actress and television presenter
- Eleonora Czartoryska (1710–1795), Polish princess, born Countess von Waldstein-Wartenberg
- Eleonora Charlotta d'Albedyhll (1770–1835), Swedish countess, poet and salon holder
- Eleonora Daniele (born 1976), Italian television presenter and former actress
- Eleonora Davtyan (born 1992), Armenian professional footballer
- Eleonora De Angelis (born 1967), Italian voice actress
- Eleonora De Paolis (born 1986), Italian paracanoeist
- Eleonora Di Nezza, Italian mathematician
- Eleonora Dimakos, Greek-Canadian model, actress, journalist, makeup artist, esthetician, and spa manager
- Eleonora Dominici (born 1996), Italian racewalker
- Eleonora Duse (1858–1924), Italian actress
- Eleonora Dziękiewicz (born 1978), Polish volleyball player
- Eleonora Ehrenbergová (1832–1912), Czech operatic soprano
- Eleonora Eksanishvili (1919–2003), Georgian pianist, music educator and composer
- Eleonora Evi (born 1983), Italian politician
- Eleonora Fersino (born 2000), Italian volleyball player
- Eleonora Forenza (born 1976), Italian politician
- Eleonora Gabrielian (born 1929), Armenian botanist
- Eleonora Gaggero (born 2001), Italian actress
- Eleonora Gasparrini (born 2002), Italian professional track and road cyclist
- Eleonora Giorgi (1953–2025), Italian actress
- Eleonora Giorgi (racewalker) (born 1989), Italian race walker
- Eleonora Goldoni (born 1996), Italian professional footballer
- Eleonora Jenko Groyer (1879–1959), Slovenian physician
- Eleonora Hiltl (1905–1979), Austrian politician
- Eleonora Hostasch (born 1944), Austrian politician and trade union leader
- Eleonora Kaminskaitė (1951–1986), Lithuanian rower
- Eleonora Kezhova (born 1985), retired Bulgarian rhythmic gymnast
- Eleonora Kodele (born 1998), Slovenian handball player
- Eleonora Lo Bianco (born 1979), Italian volleyball player
- Eleonora Luthander (1954–2021), Swedish and Serbian poet, columnist and translator
- Eleonora Marchiando (born 1997), Italian athlete
- Eleonora Masalab (born 1988), Ukrainian model and beauty pageant titleholder
- Eleonora Meleti (born 1978), Greek journalist
- Eleonora de Mendonça (born 1948), Brazilian long-distance runner
- Eleonora Mihalca (born 1945), former international table tennis player from Romania
- Eleonora Milusheva (born 1973), Bulgarian athlete
- Eleonora Mitrofanova (born 1953), Russian politician and diplomat
- Eléonora Molinaro (born 2000), Luxembourgish tennis player
- Eleonora Ramirez di Montalvo (1602–1659), Italian educator, author, and poet
- Eleonora Monti, 18th-century Italian artist best known as a portraitist
- Eleonora Oliva (born 1998), Italian professional footballer
- Eleonora Patacchini, economist
- Eleonora Patuzzo (born 1989), road cyclist from Italy
- Eleonora Pedron (born 1982), Italian model and actress who was crowned Miss Italia 2002
- Eleonora Piacezzi (born 1995), Italian professional footballer
- Eleonora Requena (born 1968), Venezuelan poet
- Eleonora Romanova (born 1998), Ukrainian-Russian rhythmic gymnast
- Eleonora Rossi Drago (1925–2007), Italian film actress
- Eleonora Säfström (1770–1857), Swedish opera singer
- Eleonora Schmitt (born 1931), former Olympic freestyle swimmer from Brazil
- Eleonora Sears (1881–1968), American tennis champion of the 1910s
- Eleonora Soldo (born 1984), Italian road and track racing cyclist
- Eleonora Trivella (born 1990), Italian lightweight rower
- Eleonora Troja, Italian astrophysicist
- Eleonora Tscherning (1817–1890), Danish painter
- Eleonora Vallone (born 1955), Italian actress, model and TV-personality
- Eleonora "Ellen" van Dijk (born 1987), Dutch road and track cyclist
- Eleonora Vandi (born 1996), Italian middle-distance runner
- Eleonora Vargas, Italian film actress
- Eleonora Vegliante (born 1973), Venezuelan former professional tennis player
- Eleonora Vild (born 1969) is a Serbian former basketball player
- Eleonora Vindau (born 1986), Ukrainian soprano opera singer
- Eleonora Vinnichenko (born 1993), Ukrainian former competitive figure skater
- Eleonora Vinogradova (1931–2003), Ukrainian choir director, educator, and professor
- Eleonora von Essen (born 1978), Swedish food writer and cookbook author
- Eleonora Wexler (born 1974), Argentine actress
- Eleonóra Zichy (1867–1945), Hungarian noblewoman
- Eleonora Ziemięcka (1819–1869), Polish philosopher and publicist
- Eleonora Zouganeli (born 1983), Greek singer
- Eleonora Zrza (1797–1862), Danish opera soprano

=== People with the given name Ellinor ===
- Ellinor Davenport Adams, British journalist and writer
- Ellinor Aiki (1893–1969), Estonian painter
- Mary Ellinor Lucy Archer MBE (1893–1979), Australian scientist and librarian
- Ellinor Eriksson (born 1988), Swedish Social Democratic politician
- Ellinor Flor (born 1946), Norwegian textile artist
- Ellinor Franzén (born 1978), Swedish singer
- Ellinor Hinks (1912–2004), Principal of Nonington College of Physical Education in Kent, UK
- Ellinor Huusko (born 1996), Swedish professional racing cyclist
- Ellinor Jåma (born 1979), Norwegian Sami politician in the Sami Parliament of Norway
- Ellinor Ljungros (born 1953), former female long-distance runner from Sweden
- Ellinor Olovsdotter (born 1985), known as Elliphant, Swedish singer, rapper and songwriter
- Ellinor Peerschke (1954–2023), American scientist
- Ellinor Catherine Cunningham van Someren OBE (1915–1998), Ugandan-born British medical entomologist
- Ellinor Südow (born 1998), Swedish professional golfer
- Ellinor Vanderveer (1886–1976), American actress
- Ellinor Wachsmuth, known as Ellinor Tordis (1895–1973), Austrian dancer and dance educator in Vienna in the 1920s
- Ellinor Walker (1893–1990), Australian kindergarten teacher

=== People with the given name Ellinore ===
- Ellinore Lightbody (born 1959), British tennis coach and former professional player

== Fictional characters ==
- Eleanor Rigby, main character in the Beatles song of the same name
- Eleanor, a car in the 1974 film Gone in 60 Seconds, and another in the 2000 remake
- Elenore Baker, supporting character in the anime Madlax
- Ellie Bishop, in the television series NCIS
- Eleanor Butterbean, in the television series The Grim Adventures of Billy and Mandy
- Elinor Dashwood, in the 1811 novel Sense and Sensibility by Jane Austen
- Eleanor Miller, one of the members of the female chipmunk music artist band The Chipettes
- Ellie Nash, in Degrassi: The Next Generation
- Eleanor Shellstrop, the protagonist of American fantasy sitcom The Good Place
- Eleanor "Miss Ellie" Southworth Ewing Farlow, the matriarch of the Ewing family in the CBS soap opera Dallas
- Eleanor of Tristain, in the novels and anime The Familiar of Zero
- Eleanor Waldorf, mother of a protagonist, Blair Waldorf, in TV series Gossip Girl
- Ellie Woodcomb, in the television series Chuck
- Ellie William, in the Naughty Dog/Sony Interactive video game The Last of Us

== See also ==
- Eleanora (disambiguation)
