= Hannelore =

- Pronunciation: [ˈhanəˌloːʁə]
- Gender: Female

Origin
- Origin: Germanic
- Meaning: Feminine version of "God is gracious" and unknown
- Region of origin: German

Other names
- Related names: Hanna

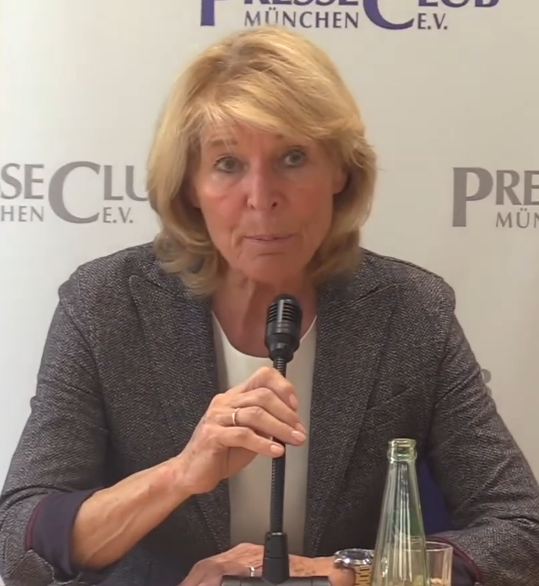
Hannelore Kiethe, Chairwoman of the Board of Münchner Tafel

Hannelore [ˈhanəˌloːʁə] is a German female given name, which is a combination of two names:

- Hanne, a German and Dutch diminutive or short form of Johanna, itself a feminized form of Iohannes (i.e. John), which means God is gracious.
- Lore, the German short form or diminutive of Eleanor, (i.e. Eleonore), a likely variant of the Latin Aenor, which is an old Germanic name of unknown meaning. There is an Occitan phrase "alia Aenor" meaning the other Aenor and used to distinguish a daughter with the same name of her mother. This became "Eleanore" in Old English.

There is also a variant of the name "Hannalora."

== People ==
=== Athletes ===
- Hannelore Anke (born 1957), German swimmer
- Hannelore Brenner (born 1963), German Paralympian dressage equestrian
- Hannelore Burosch (born 1947), German handball player
- Hannelore Glaser (born 1933), German alpine skier
- Hannelore Göttlich (born 19??), German rower
- Hannelore Hradez (1940–2022), German fencer
- Hannelore Plattner (born 19??), Austrian luger
- Hannelore Possmoser (born 19??), Austrian luger
- Hannelore Raepke (born 1935), German sprinter
- Hannelore Weygand (1924–2017), German equestrian
- Hannelore Zober (1946–2026), German handball player

=== Performers ===
- Hannelore Auer (1942–2023), Austrian Schlager singer
- Hannelore Bey (born 1941), German prima ballerina
- Hannelore Bode (born 1941), German operatic soprano
- Hannelore Bollmann (1925–2023), German actress
- Hannelore Elsner (1942–2019), German actress
- Hannelore Hoger (1942–2024), German actress and director
- Hannelore Knuts (born 1977), Belgian model
- Hannelore Schroth (1922–1987), German actress

=== Politicians ===
- Hannelore Kohl (1933–2001), former German first lady
- Hannelore Kraft (born 1961), German politician
- Hannelore Mensch (born 1937), East German politician
- Hannelore Roedel (born 1957), German politician
- Hannelore Rönsch (born 1942), German politician

=== Others ===
- Hannelore Baron (1926–1987), German-American abstract artist
- Hannelore Gadatsch (1941–2024), German television journalist and presenter
- Hannelore Jörger-Weichert (born 1942), German chessplayer
- Hannelore Schmatz (1940–1979), German mountaineer
- Hannelore "Loki" Schmidt (1919-2010), German environmentalist and former first lady
- Hannelore Valencak (1929–2004), Austrian physicist, novelist, poet, and children's author
