= Veilleux =

Veilleux is a surname. Notable people with the surname include:

- André Veilleux, Canadian ice hockey player
- David Veilleux (born 1987), Canadian cyclist
- Elinor Langton-Boyle (1865–1946) née Elinor Alice Veilleux, businesswoman and journalist
- Éric Veilleux (born 1972), Canadian ice hockey player
- Gérard Veilleux (born 1942), Canadian civil servant
- Stéphane Veilleux (ice hockey) (born 1981), Canadian ice hockey player
