= Tatlock =

Tatlock may refer to:

- Tatlock, Ontario, community in township of Lanark Highlands, Ontario

== People ==
- Alison Tatlock, executive producer and writer of US TV series Better Call Saul
- Eleanor Tatlock (1769–18330, English poet
- Jean Tatlock (1914-1944), American psychiatrist, daughter of J.S.P. Tatlock
- J. S. P. Tatlock (1876-1948), American literary scholar and medievalist, full name John Strong Perry Tatlock
- Robert Rattray Tatlock (1889–1954), Scottish writer and art critic
- Shannon Tatlock (born 1984), Canadian curler

=== Fictional characters ===
- In television series Coronation Street:
  - Albert Tatlock
  - Valerie Tatlock, a.k.a. Valerie Barlow
- Tatlock, any of several in film Miss Tatlock's Millions
- Tatlock, in two series-14 episodes of ChuckleVision television series
- Tatlock, a minor character in the novel Invisible Man

== See also ==
- TATLOCK strain, bacterium
