= Ellen Carlson =

American journalist (1929–2022)

- Born: Ellen Therese Holl; 1929; Saint Paul, Minnesota, U.S.
- Died: July 15, 2022 (aged 93); Roseville, Minnesota, U.S.
- Education: St. Catherine University
- Occupation: Columnist
- Spouse: Warren Benhardt Carlson (m. 1953)
- Children: 5
- Awards: James Beard Foundation Award (1994)

Ellen Carlson (1929 – July 15, 2022) was a columnist for the St. Paul Pioneer Press and with colleague Eleanor Ostman, won the 1994 James Beard Foundation Journalism Award.

== Biography ==
Carlson was born Ellen Therese Holl in Saint Paul, Minnesota, grew up with eight siblings in Forest Lake, Minnesota. She graduated from St. Catherine University and then taught science and home economics in a high school. In 1953, she married Warren Benhardt Carlson. Together they had five children. She wrote her column "Household Forum" for 24 years, starting after her youngest child started school.

She died on July 15, 2022, in Roseville, Minnesota.
