= Elanor (given name) =

Elanor is a feminine given name variant of Eleanor.

== People with the given name ==
- Elanor Allerton (born 1639), English colonist
- Elanor Chapin, American politician from Vermont
- Elanor Colburn (1866–1939), American painter
- Elanor Huntington, Australian computer scientist

== See also ==
- Elanor, fictional plant
