= Eleanor Holroyd =

New Zealand nursing academic

Eleanor Anne Holroyd
- Education: University of Hong Kong
- Scientific career
- Fields: sociology, nursing
- Workplaces: Chinese University of Hong Kong, Auckland University of Technology
- Thesis: Chinese family caregivers: dilemmas at the extremity of public and private obligations (1998)

Eleanor Anne Holroyd is a New Zealand nursing academic. She is currently a full professor at the Auckland University of Technology.

== Academic career ==
After a 1998 PhD at titled 'Chinese family caregivers : dilemmas at the extremity of public and private obligations' at the University of Hong Kong, she returned to New Zealand and the Auckland University of Technology (where she completed her initial nursing training), as full professor.

== Selected works ==
- Chang, Anne M., Janita PC Chau, and Eleanor Holroyd. "Translation of questionnaires and issues of equivalence." Journal of Advanced Nursing 29, no. 2 (1999): 316–322.
- Choi, Susanne YP, and Eleanor Holroyd. "The influence of power, poverty and agency in the negotiation of condom use for female sex workers in mainland China." Culture, Health & Sexuality 9, no. 5 (2007): 489–503.
- Holroyd, Eleanor, Cheung Yue‐kuen, Cheung Sau‐wai, Luk Fung‐shan, and Wong Wai‐wan. "A Chinese cultural perspective of nursing care behaviours in an acute setting." Journal of Advanced Nursing 28, no. 6 (1998): 1289–1294.
- Holroyd, Eleanor E. "Chinese cultural influences on parental caregiving obligations toward children with disabilities." Qualitative Health Research 13, no. 1 (2003): 4–19.
- Holroyd, Eleanor, Sheila Twinn, and Peymané Adab. "Socio‐cultural influences on chinese women's attendance for cervical screening." Journal of Advanced Nursing 46, no. 1 (2004): 42–52.
- Holroyd, Eleanor, Fung Kim Lai Katie, Lam Siu Chun, and Sin Wai Ha. ""Doing the month": an exploration of postpartum practices in Chinese women." Health Care for Women International 18, no. 3 (1997): 301–313.
