= Eleanor Parke Custis =

Eleanor Parke Custis may refer to:

- Eleanor Parke Custis Lewis (1779–1854), known as Nelly, step-granddaughter of George Washington
- Eleanor Parke Custis (artist) (1897–1983), American painter and photographer
