= Eleonora Bargili =

Italian artist

Eleonora Bargili was an Italian pastellist active during the eighteenth century. A nun at the convent of Santa Maria della Neve in Pistoia, she created an altarpiece of Francis de Sales for that institution. It is undated, but may have been done in conjunction with the establishment in 1739, of an Istituto di S. Francesco di Sales at the convent.
