= Eleanor Campbell =

Eleanor Campbell may refer to:

- Eleanor Campbell (physician) (1878–1959), American physician
- Eleanor Campbell (scientist) (born 1960), Scottish chemist
- Eleanor Campbell (illustrator) (1894–1986), illustrator of children's books and portrait artist
- Eleanor Campbell, Duchess of Argyll, British noblewoman
