= Eleanor Hilowitz =

American painter

Eleanor Hilowitz (1913–2007) was an abstract expressionist painter and sculptor who was active in New York City and Rome. She earned a master's degree in psychotherapy from Columbia University in 1938. She studied with Hans Hoffman, Bernard Gussow, and Yasuo Kuniyoshi. While in Rome, she had a brief correspondence with poet and critic Herbert Read. During this time her works were also exhibited at the Galleria Appunto.
