= Aenor =

Aénor (also Aenora, Ainora; the spelling Aénor suggests an original trisyllabic pronunciation) is a historical feminine given name in medieval France. It is likely the origin of, and by the later Middle Ages was replaced by, the name Eleanor (Alienor).

It arose as a latinization of an earlier Germanic name, via the form Adenordis (Aanordis, Anordis, Anor). Use of the name seems to be mostly confined to the 12th century; before that, it would have retained its original form (Anordis or similar), and after 1200 it had been mostly ousted by its replacement Eleanor. The form Adenordis is recorded in the 1090s. It may itself be a corruption of Adamardis, apparently a feminine form of Ademar.

== List ==
People with the name include:

- Adenordis, a sister of Hugo of Chaumont (fl. 1090s)
- Ainora (1102–1147) daughter of Stephen, Count of Blois and Adela of Normandy, also known as Eleanor of Champagne, the first wife of Ralph I, Count of Vermandois who was displaced by Eleanor of Aquitaine's sister Petronilla of Aquitaine, leading to a two years' war (1142–44) in Champagne.
- Aenor de Châtellerault (c. 1103–1130), also Adenordis, Adamardis, duchess of Aquitaine, wife of William X, Duke of Aquitaine and mother of Eleanor of Aquitaine.
- Aenora (Eleonore) de Vermandois (b. c. 1151, d. between 1204 and 1214), a daughter of Raoul de Vermandois.
- Aenora de Maubanc, also known as Eleanor Malbank, born c. 1172 in Norman England (Cheshire)
- Aénor de Saint-Valery (1192–1250), wife of Robert III of Dreux.
