= Elinor Meissner Traeger =

Elinor Meissner Traeger (July 10, 1906 – December 26, 1983) was an American composer, pianist, and writer.

Traeger was born in Chicago. After studying music with Len Cleary, Edna Hansen, Antoinnette Lauer, and Bess Ressiguie, she married Fred W. Traeger and they had two children, David and Lois.

Traeger composed, reviewed books and music, and taught piano, mostly in Illinois. Her music was published by Pro Art Publications and Willis Music Company, and included the following pieces for piano:

- Carousel
- Cradle Song
- Sleepytime
