= Éléonore Yayi Ladekan =

Beninese politician

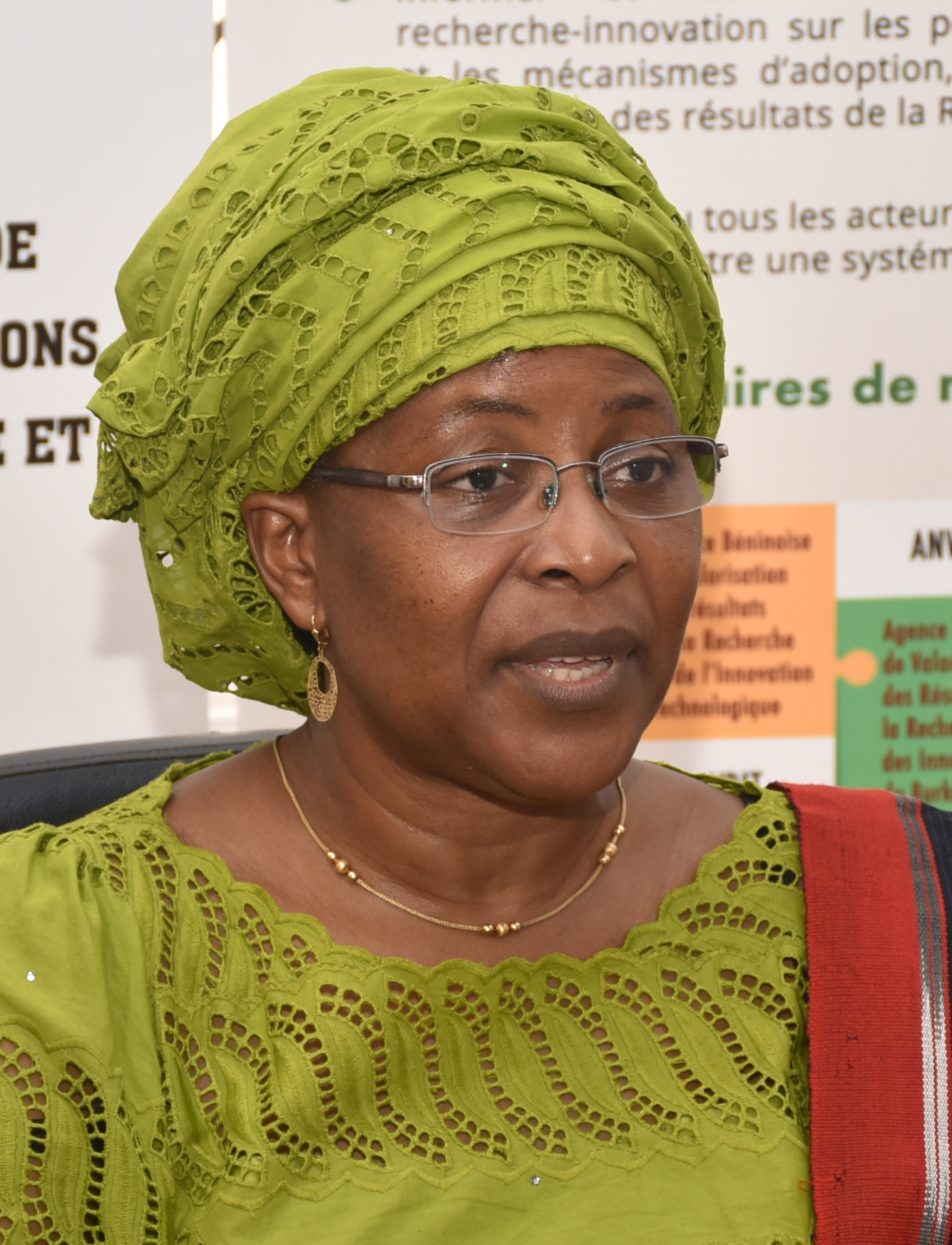

Minister of Higher Education and Scientific Research of Benin
- Incumbent
- Assumed office 25 May 2021
- President: Patrice Talon

Personal details
- Born: Benin
- Party: Independent

Éléonore Yayi Ladekan is a Beninese politician and educator. She is the current Minister of Higher Education and Scientific Research in Benin, having been appointed to the position in early 2021 by the current president of Benin, Patrice Talon. Her term began on 25 May 2021.

Awards and achievements
Preceded by	Minister of Higher Education and Scientific Research of Benin	Succeeded by
