= Elinor Sauerwein =

US teacher and benefactor

Mary Elinor Baumgart Sauerwein (January 10, 1914 - October 30, 2010) was an American philanthropist who was known for living a frugal life yet was able to leave a check for $1,731,533.91 from her estate to a California branch of the Salvation Army after her death. Taught by her mother to avoid wasting anything, she never purchased a dryer, painted her own home, mowed her own lawn, refused to go to restaurants or movies, grew her own fruits and vegetables in her meager backyard, and refused to pay for cable TV until the age of 95.

She previously worked as a teacher. After graduating from college, she taught in a one-room schoolhouse in Crookston, Nebraska, traveling to work on horseback. In 1945, she married her husband Harold and settling in Modesto, California, where she cooked for ranch hands and later worked at LM Morris business machines. Harold Sauerwein was a building contractor and built their two-bedroom home. He died in 1994.
