= Elinor Powell =

African-American nurse in World War II (1921–2005)

- Born: 1921 Milton, Massachusetts, U.S.
- Died: 2005 (aged 83–84)
- Allegiance: United States
- Branch: United States Army
- Rank: Second lieutenant

Elinor Powell (1921–2005) was an African-American nurse in World War II who married a German prisoner of war.

== Background ==
Powell was raised in Milton, Massachusetts, where her grandmother moved after she escaped slavery as a teen, travelling north via the Underground Railroad. Powell's father served in World War I, which later inspired her to also join the United States Army as a nurse.

== Career and relationship ==
In 1944, Powell joined the army and completed her basic training at Fort Huachuca, Arizona, the largest military installation for black soldiers and nurses. Powell was one of only 300 nurses allowed to join the Army Nurse Corps under strict quotas. Powell worked as a second lieutenant in the U.S. Army Nurse Corps based at POW Camp Florence, Arizona, where she was required to help German soldiers, including Nazis captured in Europe and Northern Africa, as black nurses were prohibited from treating white GIs until the last years of the war. Originally, Camp Florence employed white nurses, but they were replaced with black nurses to discourage fraternisation, and many of the camps enforced strict segregation policies.

Despite this, Powell fell in love with a German prisoner, Frederick (German: Friedrich) Albert, who was a Luftwaffe medic from Vienna who had been captured in Italy. This was incredibly risky, as such a relationship could get her court-martialled. Powell met Albert in the mess hall, where he was assigned to work as a cook. Just before Albert was released and deported in April 1946, they conceived a son, enabling Albert to obtain a visa and return the following year to marry in New York. They moved to Boston but experienced discrimination due to being in an interracial marriage, and so moved to Germany. This was no better, so they returned to settle in Connecticut. Frederick died in 2001, followed by Elinor in 2005. They had two sons, Steven and Chris. Chris became a trumpeter with the Duke Ellington Orchestra.

In 2018, the book titled Enemies in Love by Alexis Clark was written about the relationship between Elinor Powell and Frederick Albert.
