= Eleanor Annie Lamson =

Astronomer

- Born: 19 April 1875
- Died: 27 July 1932 (aged 57)
- Education: George Washington University
- Scientific career
- Workplaces: United States Naval Observatory

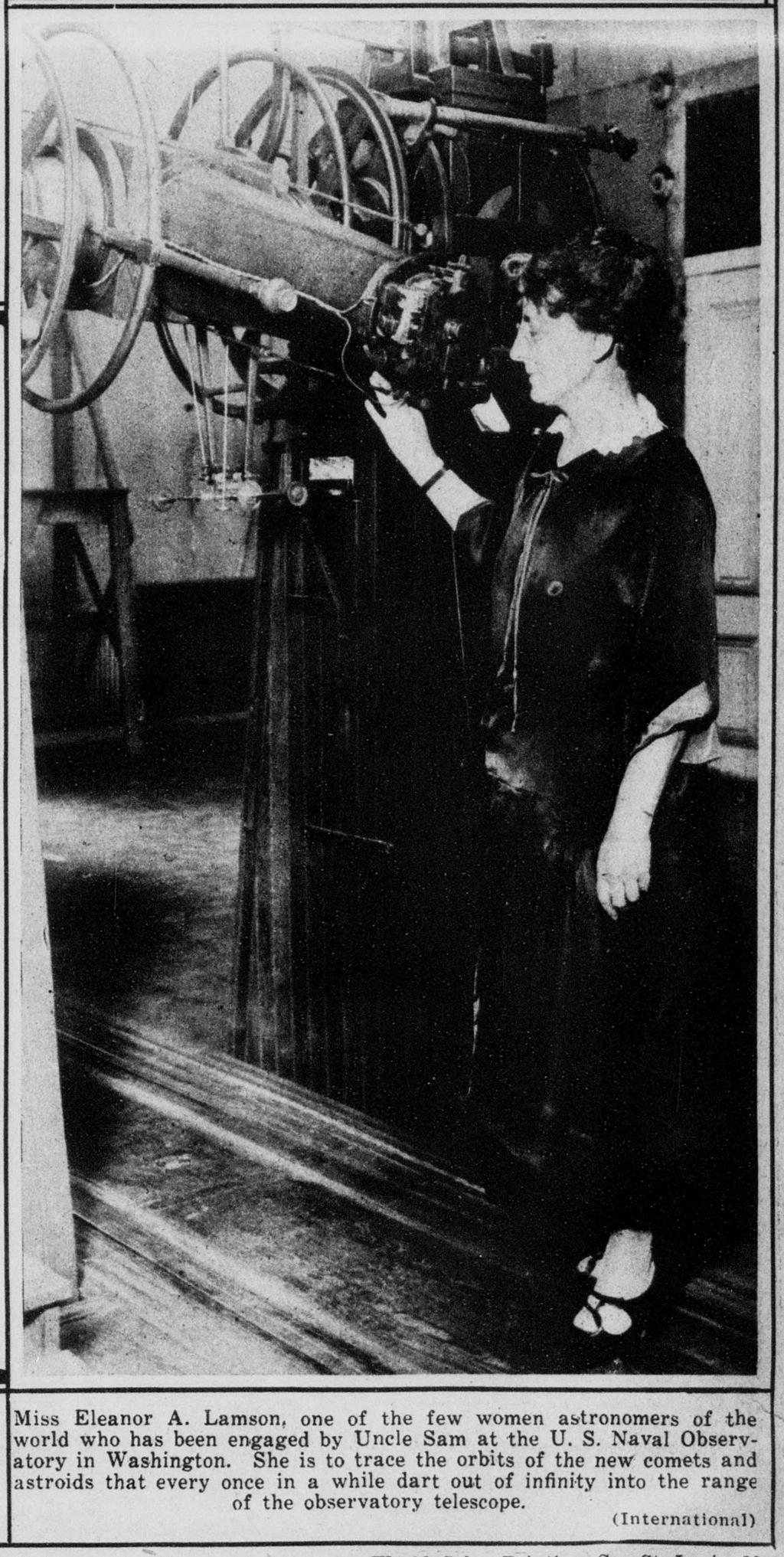
Beverly Banner (Beverly, N.J.), April 9, 1926.

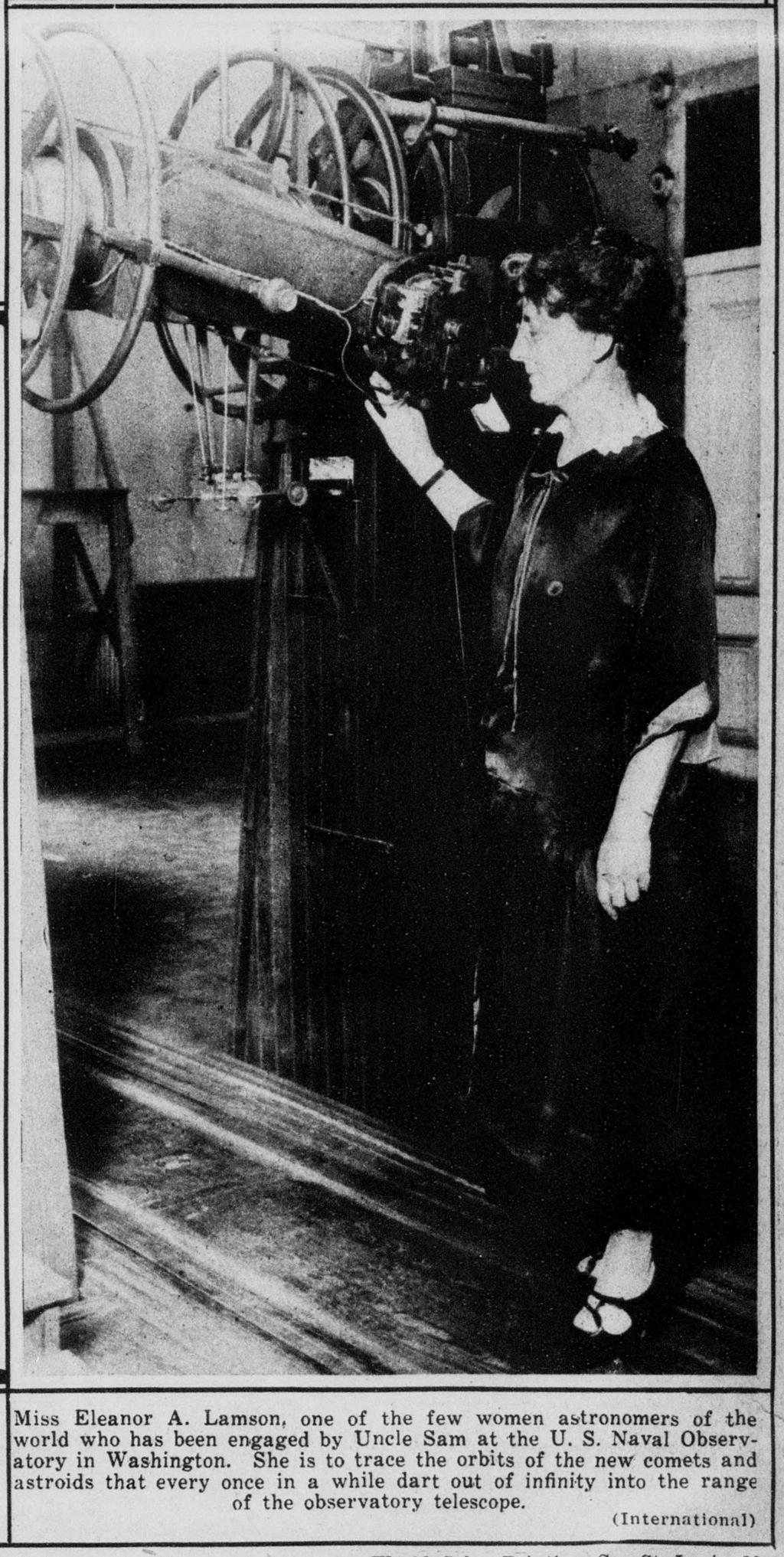

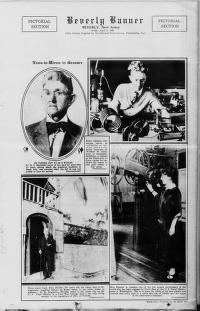
Photograph of Elanor A. Lamson (bottom right) at the U.S. Naval Observatory in Washington, D.C, and others, published in the Beverly Banner (newspaper). April 9, 1926.

Eleanor Annie Lamson (19 April 1875 – 27 July 1932) was an astronomer and the first woman scientist at the US Naval Observatory.

== Early life and education ==
Eleanor Annie Lamson was born in Washington, D.C, to Franklin Silas Lamson and Anne Frances Lamson. In 1887, she obtained her B.S in mathematics from George Washington University and her M.S in astronomy two years later in 1889.

== Research and career ==
After her degree, Lamson got a job as a "piece-work" computer at the US Naval Observatory. She started as a full time computer in 1903 and was promoted to assistant scientist in 1907, a position she maintained for sixteen years. During this time, she received a number of promotions including becoming the head of the Computing Section at the observatory. In 1925, Lamson became a National Research Council Delegate for the International Astronomical Union and was promoted to associate scientist at the US Naval Observatory, the first time a woman held this title.

Her contribution to the USS S-21 expedition, one of the first submarine missions to understand Earth's gravity in oceanic regions, is detailed in the appendix of the paper published about this experiment. In 1929, she wrote the technical summary of the submarine cruise for the United States Coast and Geodetic Survey's Annual Report on Operations.

There are many scientific papers bearing her name describing her work on orbits for numerous different comets and for bodies that orbit Mars.

== Selected publications ==
- E. A. Lamson; A. Hall Jr.; E. C. Bower. (November 1926). "Corrections to the elements of the satellites of Mars". The Astronomical Journal. 37:69. doi:10.1086/104749
