= Eleanor Harper Caldwell =

American film editor

Eleanor Harper Caldwell (1910–1976) was an American film editor.

== Biography ==
Born in Leavenworth, Kansas, she moved to New York during her elementary school years and later graduated from Columbia University. She worked as the social director of the American Woman's Club, which supported women relocating to New York City, and was married to poet John Caldwell.

Caldwell worked as an editor for Educational Directions of Westport, where she produced educational film strips for schools. Although she battled cancer for two years, she continued her work until her death. In New Canaan, Connecticut, Caldwell organized tours of homes of architectural interest, including the glass house designed by Philip Johnson.
