= Elinor Portnoy =

Elinor Portnoy (Hebrew: אלינור פורטנוי) is an Israeli-born glass artist based in London, England.

== Biography ==
Portnoy was born in Israel and completed a Bachelor of Arts in design at Holon Institute of Technology in Israel in 2010. She then worked as head designer at Ototo, a design studio in Tel Aviv. She moved to London and completed a Master of Arts in ceramics and glass at the Royal College of Art.

In 2017 she was invited to a residency at Corning Museum of Glass.
