= Eleanor Cunningham Bannister =

American portrait painter

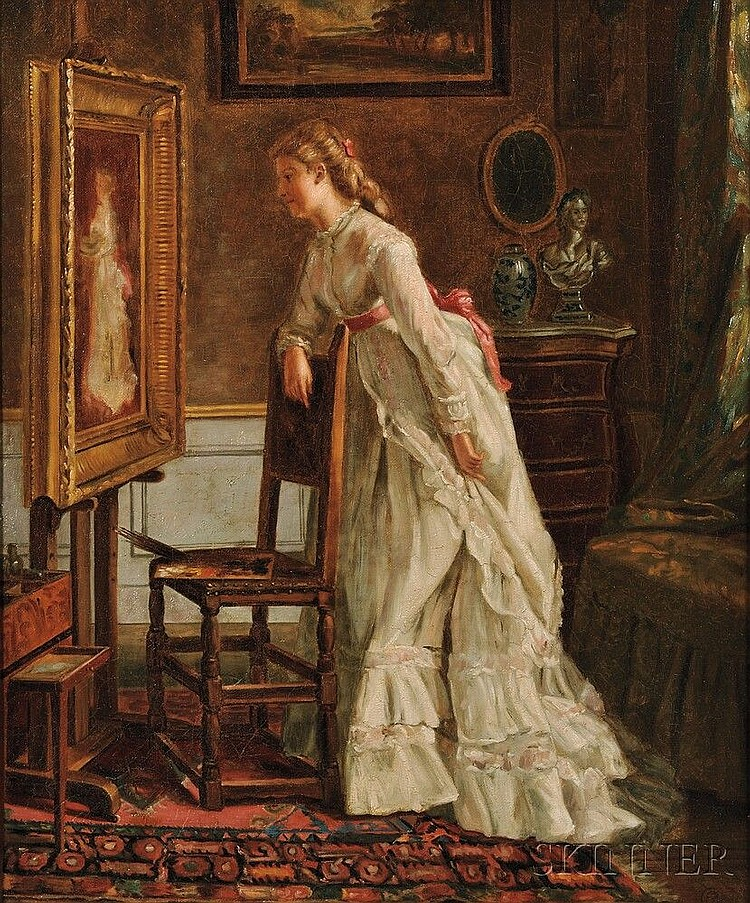
- Admiring Her Own Portrait (self-portrait)
- Born: October 3, 1858; Manhattan
- Died: January 20, 1939 (aged 80); Brooklyn
- Parent(s): James Bannister
- Relatives: William P. Bannister

Eleanor Cunningham Bannister (October 3, 1858 – January 20, 1939) was an American portrait painter.

Eleanor Cunningham Bannister was born on October 3, 1858 in Manhattan, the daughter of engraver James Bannister and Ellen Hogg. Her brother was the architect William Bannister. She was educated at Public School 15 and the Packer Collegiate Institute.

She studied art at the Adelphi Academy under painter John Barnard Whittaker. Bannister began exhibiting with the Brooklyn Art Association and the Brooklyn Art Club in the 1880s. She became a portrait painter and her subjects included a number of notable Brooklyn residents.

In 1890 she studied at the Académie Julian in Paris, where she was a student of Benjamin Constant and Jules-Joseph Lefebvre. She returned to the US the next year.

Her students included Elisabeth Luther Cary.

Eleanor Cunningham Bannister died on 20 January 1939 in Brooklyn.
