= Eleanor Legasto Nishiumi =

Filipino television presenter

Eleanor Legasto Nishiumi, popularly known as Ellen Nishiumi (born February 22, 1966), is a Filipino television personality best known for her role as the host of Oh Tokyo, an informative program on the Japanese-Filipino WINS (World Interactive Network System) cable channel.

== Background ==
Nishiumi was born on February 23, 1966, in the Philippines, to Edgardo V. Legasto, a renowned short story writer, and Elsa Diaz. At 18, she began training with a Filipino dance troupe that performed in Japan. During her time there, she met Toshiya Nishiumi, and the two married in Tokyo in 1993.

In 1995, a Filipino friend who hosted the small online news program WINS Japan encouraged Nishiumi to audition as a reporter. Despite her limited proficiency in Japanese, she decided to give it a try and ultimately landed the position.

She later became a host reporter for the Oh Tokyo information program on the Filipino-Japanese cable channel WINS. The show had Nishiumi visiting various Tokyo landmarks, interviewing locals in Japanese while presenting the program in Tagalog. It ran for eight successful years, from 2000 to 2008, until the channel's closure.

On October 7, 2006, ABS-CBN's show Nagmamahal, Kapamilya aired an episode inspired by Nishiumi's life, with actress Toni Gonzaga portraying her.
