= El Hardwick =

British artist, photographer and curator

Eleanor Hardwick
- Born: 1993 (age 32–33); Oxford, England
- Known for: Photography; music
- Website: elhardwick.com

El Hardwick (born 1993) is a British photographer, director, curator, musician and multidisciplinary artist who performs under the moniker Moonbow. They identify as non-binary. Hardwick, their sister Rachel, and Chrissie White collaborated in 2016 on a self-published photography book, Celestial bodies. Hardwick has been interviewed by and featured in such publications as The Independent, The Guardian, and British Vogue, and has exhibited at such galleries as the Victoria and Albert Museum, the Southbank Centre, and The Cob Gallery.
