= Eleonora Eksanishvili =

Eleonora Grigor'yevna Eksanishvili (Yeksanishvili) (February 11, 1919 – January 5, 2003) was a Georgian pianist, music educator and composer. Her compositions include two children's operas, a concerto for piano and orchestra, and a Piano Quintet. She has published an article which is featured in the book Sergei Rachmaninoff: a bio-bibliography on Rachmaninoff's visit to Tbilisi, the capital of Georgia. Eksanishvili died in January 2003 at the age of 83.
