= Eleonora Requena =

Venezuelan poet

- Born: 1968 (age 57–58); Caracas, Venezuela
- Education: Universidad Católica Andrés Bello
- Occupation: Poet

Eleonora Requena (born 1968) is a Venezuelan poet.

== Education and career ==
Requena studied literature at the Universidad Católica Andrés Bello in Caracas.

She has published the poetry collections Sed (Eclepsidra, 1998), mandados (La Liebre Libre, 2000), Es de día (El Pez Soluble, 2004), La Noche y sus agüeros (El Pez Soluble, 2007), Ética del aire (bid & co. editor, 2008), Nido de tordo (Kalathos, 2015), and Textos por fuera (El Taller Blanco, 2020).

Requena also participated in the literary workshops of the Rómulo Gallegos Center for the Latin American Studies (Celarg), where she published her collection Voces Nuevas (1995-1997). Requena's work has been published in several critical studies and anthologies both in Venezuela and abroad.

== Awards ==
With her poem mandados, Requena won the award at the Fifth José Rafael Pocaterra Latin American Poetry Biennial in 2000. She later received the 2007 Italy Poetry Award for La Noche y sus agüeros in the «Mediterranean and Caribbean» competition, organized by the Italian Institute of Culture of Venezuela and the University of Bologna 's Center for Contemporary Poetry.

== Works ==
- Sed (Eclepsidra, 1998)
- mandados (La Liebre Libre, 2000)
- Es de día (El Pez Soluble, 2004)
- La Noche y sus agüeros (El Pez Soluble, 2007)
- Ética del aire (bid & co. editor, 2008)
- Nido de tordo (Kalathos, 2015)
- Textos por fuera (El taller blanco, 2020)
