= Eleonora Patacchini =

American economist

Eleonora Patacchini is an economist specializing in applied economics and applied statistics who grew up in Italy with her mother who was also a professor. She is a professor and associate department chair at Cornell University in the Department of Economics. Her research focuses on the empirical analysis of behavioral models of strategic interactions for decision making. Patacchini is an associate editor at Journal of Urban Economics and Statistical Methods & Applications. She is a columnist at the VOX CEPR Policy Portal where research-based policy analysis and commentary from leading economists are published frequently. She is also a co-editor of E-journal Economics and associate editor of the Journal of Urban Economics.

== Education ==
Patacchini studied at the Sapienza University of Rome, where she graduated summa cum laude with a bachelor's degree in the field of sciences. She went on to pursue a Master of Science in economics at the University Pompeu Fabra in Spain, after which point she returned to Italy to complete her Ph.D. in statistics in 2003 at the Sapienza University of Rome. Patacchini then pursued her second Ph.D. in the field of economics at the University of Southampton.

== Selected journal publications ==
"Mothers, Peers, and Gender-Role Identity" in the Journal of the European Economic Association and "Social Networks in Policy Making" in the Annual Review of Economics.

Patacchini's research primarily focuses on behavioral economics where an individual's behavior is influenced by the immediate social contacts or circle, particularly the role of women in economy. Her work also explores the labor market impacts through the dimensions within families and social circles such as friendships and other relationships. Her work has also focused on the cultural norms that shapes decision making in the context of women in the workforce and the role of social connections and/or relationships in legislatures, especially the US Congress and how it influences policy making.

"Self-control and peer groups: An empirical analysis" in the Journal of Economic Behavior & Organization

Patacchini has conducted an empirical analysis with Marco Battaglini and Carlos Díaz on self-control and peer groups, where they found evidence consistent with the two key predictions of this theory regarding the relationship between an agent's expected level of self-control and the size and composition of his or her social circles: (i) students embedded in social circles have more self-control than those who are alone and their self-control is increasing in the size of their social group; (ii) students’ self-control is, however, a non-monotonic hump-shaped function of the average self-control of their friends.

"Treatment Effects With Heterogeneous Externalities" in the Journal of Business & Economic Statistics

In this article, Tiziano Arduini, Eleonora Patacchini and Edoardo Rainone propose a new method for estimating heterogeneous externalities in policy analysis when social interactions take the linear-in-means form. They establish that the parameters of interest can be identified and consistently estimated using specific functions of the share of the eligible population. Conditional cash transfers, or similar welfare programs, generate indirect effects on untreated subjects in the presence of social interactions. The analysis of heterogeneous indirect effects is complicated because of simultaneity issues arising from social interactions.

== Research interests ==
Patacchini has described her research interests as "My strategy is to develop sound econometrics techniques, together with a theoretical model that can guide the interpretation of the results. My papers acquire different connotations according to the definition of space considered, i.e., according to the sources of interdependence between economic agents. In my research I use three main qualifications of the spatial dimension: (i) social networks; (ii) residential location; (iii) culture."

== Bibliography ==
=== Chapters ===
- "Lavorare in una grande città italiana paga, ma poco", p. 135-146, with S. Di Addario, in G. Brunello, D. Checchi, C. Lucifera, A. Ichino (eds), Per un’analisi critica del mercato del lavoro, Il Mulino, Bologna, 2005
- "Wages and the City", with S. Di Addario, in Agglomeration Effects on the Labour Market: The Italian Case, S. Di Addario, VDM Verlag, Germany, 2009
- "Intuizione e previsione dell’espansione urbana. Considerazione economiche e statistiche", in Gemmiti R., Salvati L. (eds), C’era una volta la città. Una lettura multidisciplinare del mutamento urbano. Fattori e rischi, Bonanno, Roma, 2011
- "Cultural Integration in Italy", with A. Bisin, Cultural Integration in Europe, Y. Algan, A. Bisin, A. Manning, T. Verdier (eds), Oxford University Press, 2012
- "Strategic Interactions on Financial Networks for the Analysis of Systemic Risk", with E. Cohen-Cole and A. Kirilenko, in the Handbook on Systemic Risk, J.-P. Fouque, J.A., Langsam (eds), Cambridge University Press, 2013
- "Spatial Methods", with H. Overman and S. Gibbons in the Handbook of Regional and Urban Economics, volume 5 2015, G. Duranton, V. Henderson and W. Strange (eds)

=== Books ===
- Active Labor Market Policies in Europe. Performance and Perspective”, with D. Card, M. Fertig, M. Góra, R. Leetmaa, J. Kluve, C. Schmidt, P. Jensen, B. Van der Klaauw, A. Weber, Springer Berlin Heidelberg New York, 2007
- Latent Variables in Panel Data Models: Theoretical Contributions and Empirical Applications, VDM Verlag, Germany, 2009
- Unexplored Dimensions of Discrimination, with T. Boeri and G. Peri, Oxford University Press, 2015: Using data and econometric approaches, the book analyzes the issue of wage and employment differences between genders and along less explored dimensions such as religion, sexual orientation, and physical appearance. Homosexuals seem to have lower chances of employment than their heterosexual counterparts in Europe. The experiment in Italy confirms this tendency, with male homosexuals being the most penalized group.

== Conferences and organizations ==
She is a program committee member at the European Economic Association (EEA) annual congress, European Winter Meeting of the Econometric Society, and Econometric Society European Meeting. She has also been on the panel for conferences of The Economics of Coordination and Communication: Theory and Empirics, Economics of Interactions and Culture, and International Trade and Finance.

== Honors and awards ==
Year	Award	Institution
2014	Geoffrey J.D. Hewings Award for distinguished contributions to Regional Science research	North American Regional Science Council
2011	Excellence Award in Global Economic Affairs	Kiel Institute for the World Economy
2011	Oliver E. Williamson Prize	Journal of Economics, Law & Organization
2010	Research Excellence Award in Economics	Sapienza University of Rome
2011	Birke Hospitality Fellowship	Kiel Institute for the World Economy
2010	Visiting Fellowship	Collegio Carlo Alberto
2012	Fernand Braudel Senior Fellowship	European University Institute
2014	Visiting Scholar	Federal Reserve Bank of Philadelphia

== Affiliations ==
Research Affiliate at EIEF, Einaudi Institute for Economics and Finance

Research Fellow at the Kiel Institute for the World Economy

Research Fellow at CEPR, Centre for Economic Policy Research, Public Policy programme

Research Affiliates at CEPR, International Trade and Regional Economics programme

Research Fellow at IZA, Institute for the Study of Labor

Research Fellow at CeLEG, Center for Labor and Economic Growth, and at Luiss Lab of European Economics, L.U.I.S.S. Guido Carli University
