= Elinor Black =

Canadian obstetrician and gynaecologist

- Born: September 9, 1905; Nelson, British Columbia
- Died: January 30, 1982 (aged 76)
- Education: University of Manitoba

Elinor Black (1905–1982) was a Canadian obstetrician and gynaecologist. In 1949, Black was the first Canadian woman to become a fellow of Royal College of Obstetricians and Gynaecologists. In 1951, she was named chair of the department of obstetrics and gynaecology at the University of Manitoba.

== Early life and education ==
Black was born September 9, 1905, in Nelson, British Columbia. Her father, Francis (Frank) Black immigrated to Canada from Scotland in 1891. Before being elected to the Manitoba Legislature, he worked as a businessman with a meatpacking company and a farming organsition, which led to the family relocating often throughout her childhood and living for periods of time spent in Calgary, Alberta and Winnipeg, Manitoba. In 1912, Black, along with her siblings and their mother, Margaret, spent time in Edinburgh learning about their Scottish heritage.

In 1926, Black enrolled in medical school against the wishes of her family, including her brother Donald, himself a medical student, who viewed the prospect of women in the program as a "nuisance". Black earned her medical degree from the University of Manitoba in 1930.

== Professional career ==
After graduation, Black spent a year doing post-graduate work in London, England before returning to Winnipeg to set up a practice. She struggled to gain patients due to the financial challenges of operating during the Great Depression.

In 1934, Black joined the University of Manitoba as a demonstrator and, in 1937, became the only women lecturer at a Canadian medical school. The same year she served a six-month appointment as house surgeon at the South London Hospital for Women.

In 1938, Black became the first Canadian woman to become a member of Royal College of Obstetricians and Gynaecologists. In 1949, she became the first Canadian woman to become a member of Royal College.

In 1951, Black was named chair of the department of obstetrics and gynaecology at the University of Manitoba.

She also served as 16th president of the Society of Obstetricians and Gynaecologists of Canada. Appointed to the role in 1961, she was the first woman to be named president of the society. In 1970, Black was given an honorary doctorate by the University of Manitoba.
