= Eleanor Joan Ellis =

British artist

- Born: Putney, London, England
- Died: 1989 (aged 84–85)
- Education: Brook Green School
- Known for: Painting, engraving

Eleanor Joan Ellis (1904–1989) was a British artist known for her paintings and wood engravings.

== Biography ==
Ellis was born in Putney in London and attended school in Malvern Wells before, from 1923 to 1925, studying at Brook Green, the art school set up and run by Leon Underwood. Throughout her career, Ellis created wood engravings and painted in both oils and watercolour. She exhibited regularly with the English Wood Engraving Society, with the New English Art Club, the Royal Society of British Artists and, in 1927, with the Royal Hibernian Academy. She also had solo exhibitions at both the Redfern Gallery and the Gieves Art Gallery. During the 1930s Ellis spent some time in St Ives and was elected a member of the St Ives Society of Artists. Several of her woodcut designs were reproduced in The Studio magazine.
