= Eleanor Knowles =

American author and editor

Eleanor Knowles Laney (February 28, 1932 – July 17, 2010) was a vice president of Deseret Book and an author and editor who wrote many Mormon-related books. She was a key figure in the publication of the LDS edition of the Bible and the other standard works in 1979–81.

== Biography ==
Knowles was born and raised in Ogden, Utah. She graduated from Ogden High School and then attended the University of Utah where she boarded with John A. Widtsoe and his wife Leah. After one year, she transferred to Utah State University where she eventually became the campus newspaper editor.

From 1954 to 1959, Knowles worked for the Deseret News. She then moved to New York City where she edited Supervisory Management and then worked for Cornell University Medical School. She was president of the Young Women's Mutual Improvement Association (YWMIA) of the New York New York Stake.

Knowles returned to Utah in 1965 to serve as an editor with the Improvement Era. In 1969, she joined Deseret Book as the first full-time editor. She later became a vice president of that company. During these years, Knowles served as a member of the general board of the YWMIA.

Knowles wrote biographies of Howard W. Hunter and William J. Critchlow, Jr. She also wrote many articles for the Ensign and edited books by several general authorities. Knowles retired from Deseret Book in 1994. (Note: Knowles also contributed two articles to the Encyclopedia of Mormonism in 1992, one on "Deseret Book Company" and the second under "Doctrine - Treatises on Doctrine.")

In February 2007, Knowles married Richard B. Laney, a former editorial editor of the Deseret News, in the Bountiful Utah Temple.

== Sources ==
- Church News, July 24, 2010, p. 13
- Lynn Arave, "Eleanor Knowles Laney, first female vice president of Deseret Book, dies", Deseret News, August 3, 2010
- Ogden Standard-Examiner, July 19, 2010

"Encyclopedia of Mormonism" Eleanor Knowles - article - "Deseret Book Company" Volume 1, p. 374; article - "Doctrine-Treatises on Doctrine", volume 1, pages 403-404.
