= Eleanor Ostman =

American food writer

- Born: Hibbing, Minnesota, U.S.
- Education: Macalester College
- Occupations: Newspaper columnist and author
- Employer: St. Paul Pioneer Press
- Writing career
- Subject: Food
- Notable awards: James Beard Foundation Journalism Award (1994)

Eleanor Ostman is the former food columnist for the St. Paul Pioneer Press and author of Always on Sunday Revisited and Minnesota Eats Out.

With colleague Ellen Carlson, Ostman won the 1994 James Beard Foundation Journalism Award.

== Biography ==
She is a native of Hibbing, Minnesota, and a graduate of Macalester College, where she studied journalism.

== Career ==
Ostman's weekly newspaper column was written from 1968 until 1998 and was called "Tested Recipes" and it was "the longest running personal food column in U.S. history".

== Selected publications ==
- Celebrations to Remember co-written with Soile Anderson
