= Elinor P. Thompson =

British microbial and plant scientist

- Education: University College, London
- Scientific career
- Fields: microbiology
- Workplaces: University of Greenwich
- Thesis: Proteins involved in the maintenance of the photosynthetic apparatus in cyanobacteria and plants (2003)
- Doctoral advisors: Conrad Mullineaux and Saul Purton

Elinor P. Thompson is Reader in microbiology and plant science at the University of Greenwich, UK. Her research focuses on the FtsH family of membrane proteins that act as proteases and the use of Dictyostelium discoideum as a model organism. She is also involved with science communication.

She has been a member of faculty at the University of Greenwich since 2010. After doctoral and post-doctoral research into membrane proteins in plants and bacteria at University College, London and University of Cambridge, her own research now concentrates on membrane proteases in the eukaryote social amoeba Dictyostelium discoideum and supports the application of this model organism to many research areas, especially signalling, development and translational research. Her research group uses technologies of molecular biology, imaging, spectroscopy and mathematical modelling to explore the detailed roles of these proteins where these proteins are essential in signalling and regulation. FtsH protein family members are involved in removing damaged proteins such as photodamaged proteins from the photosynthetic apparatus in cyanobacteria and plants and mis-assembled proteins. Her research on photodamage has also led her into collaborations about agrovoltaics, the simultaneous use of land for agriculture and solar energy.

Following graduating in microbiology, she worked for the scientific journal Journal of General Virology before returning to academic study at University College London. She was a guest on the BBC Radio 4 discussion programme In our Time about slime moulds in January 2025, presented by Melvyn Bragg. She chairs the Eukaryotic Division of the Microbiology Society.

== Publications ==
She is the author or co-author of over 20 scientific publications and conference contributions. They include:

- Robin S. B. Williams, Jonathan R. Chubb, Robert Insall, Jason S. King, Catherine J. Pears, Elinor Thompson, and Cornelis J. Weijer. (2021) Moving the Research Forward: The Best of British Biology Using the Tractable Model System Dictyostelium discoideum. Cells, 10 (11), 3036.
- Elinor P. Thompson, Emilio L. Bombelli, Simon Shubham, Hamish Watson, Aldous Everard, Vincenzo D'Ardes, Andrea Schievano, Stefano Bocchi, Nazanin Zand, Christopher J. Howe, Paolo Bombelli. (2020) Semi-Transparent Solar Panels Allow Concurrent Production of Crops and Electricity on the Same Cropland. Advanced Energy materials, 10, 200118.
- Elinor P. Thompson, Christopher Wilkins, Vadim Demidchik, Julia M. Davies, Beverley J. Glover. (2009) An Arabidopsis flavonoid transporter is required for anther dehiscence and pollen development. Journal of Experimental Botany, Volume 61, (2), pages 439–451.
- Paulo Silva, Elinor Thompson, Shaun Bailey, Olaf Kruse, Conrad W Mullineaux, Colin Robinson, Nicholas H Mann, Peter J Nixon. (2003) FtsH Is Involved in the Early Stages of Repair of Photosystem II in Synechocystis sp PCC 6803. The Plant Cell, 15, (9), pages 2152–2164.
