= Eleanor Morton =

Eleanor Morton may refer to:

- Eleanor Morton (comedian), Scottish comedian and writer
- Eleanor Morton (model), Australian model
