= Elinor Sullivan =

American physiologist

Elinor L. Sullivan is an American physiologist, specializing in behavioural neuroscience. Her research focuses primarily on the early influence of environmental and maternal factors on early child development, specifically emphasizing the mental disorders associated with these factors.

== Education and employment ==
Sullivan received her Bachelor of Arts in Biology in 2000 from Willamette University in Salem, Oregon. Sullivan's physiology doctorate was awarded to her in 2006 from Oregon Health and Science University (OHSU), with post-doctorate training occurring at the University of California San Francisco and OHSU.

Sullivan's career began in August 2011 when she was simultaneously at the Oregon National Primate Research Centre, where she was an assistant professor, and at the University of Portland, where she was also an assistant professor until March 2017. As of 2023, Sullivan is still at the University of Portland in the Department of Biology. In August 2017, Sullivan joined the Department of Human Physiology at the University of Oregon, as well as the Department of Psychiatry, where she is an associate professor.

== Research interests ==
Sullivan has specific interests in researching the influence of maternal metabolism and diet on their offspring behaviour regulation, particularly focusing on mental health and behavioural disorders. Her expertise is especially noted in fields such as brain development, developmental programming, maternal nutrition, neurodevelopmental disorders, and behavioural neuroscience.

== Controversies ==
On a few different occasions, there have been disputes with PETA regarding the research done at OHSU, specifically regarding their use of animals within their research, as well as the transparency of the research. Concerning Sullivan, in 2019, she and the Oregon Health and Science University had an experience with PETA. PETA demanded the University to share footage of their research on macaque monkeys, in which they were breeding the female monkeys and putting the infants in a stressful situation to see the influence that stress may have on the offspring. In April 2020, it was announced that PETA won the case.
