= Eleanor Parker (historian) =

British historian

Academic background
- Education: University of Oxford
- Thesis: Anglo-Scandinavian literature in post-Conquest England (2013)

Academic work
- Notable works: Winters in the World
- Website: aclerkofoxford.blogspot.com

Eleanor Catherine Parker is a British historian and medievalist. As of 2022 she is lecturer in Medieval English Literature at Brasenose College, Oxford, and was previously a Mellon Postdoctoral Fellow at The Oxford Research Centre in the Humanities (TORCH). She is a columnist at History Today.

== Career ==
Parker studied Old and Middle English and Old Norse Literature at the University of Oxford. She started her blog, "A Clerk of Oxford", in 2008, whilst an undergraduate student at Oxford. The blog won the 2015 Longman-History Today award for Digital History. It was described as "unrivalled in bringing in outsiders to understand the reality of everything from the Dwarves' treasure to God's Darling" and "an orchard of golden apples" by Christopher Howse in The Daily Telegraph. In 2019, Parker read from the Knútsdrápur, and interpreted its meaning, in a programme for BBC World Service.

== Books ==
In May 2018, she published her first book, Dragon Lords: The History and Legends of Viking England. Her second book, Conquered: The Last Children of Anglo-Saxon England, was published in 2022, and was selected by The Times as one of the best books of 2022.

Her third book, Winters in the World: A Journey through the Anglo-Saxon Year, was described by Kathryn Hughes as a "magical exploration of the weather literature left behind by the poets, scientists and historians of Anglo-Saxon Britain", by Christopher Howse as "fascinating and authoritative", and by Charlie Connelly as a "beautifully written account [which] transports us through each season in a deeply sensual manner". It was selected by Dominic Sandbrook writing in The Times as one of the 25 best history books of 2022 and by Michael Wood as one of the 21 best books for history lovers in BBC History Magazine. In a review for First Things Francis Young described the book as "a beguiling and compelling vision of sacred time" which "faithfully and richly portrays the distinctiveness of early Christian England".

Her fourth book, Hoarded Gold: A Book of Old English Wisdom, was published by Uppsala Books during November 2026.
