= Eleanor Garrison =

Activist and organizer

- Born: 1880
- Died: 1974 (aged 93–94)

Eleanor Garrison was an activist and organizer and a member of the Garrison family, a family of generational activists. She was best known for carrying on the family fight for women's rights as a paid organizer for the National American Woman's Suffrage Association.

== Life and career ==
Garrison was the daughter of Ellen Wright Garrison, an advocate of women's rights, especially women's suffrage, and William Lloyd Garrison, a reformer involved in abolition, women's rights and suffrage, immigration reform, Armenian and Russian relief, Irish home rule, anti-imperialism, pacifism, temperance, and free trade.

Garrison graduated from Smith College in 1904 and received a Master of Arts degree from Radcliffe in 1906. After graduating, the suffrage movement was at its peak and she worked for the vote until 1919. In 1912, she became an organizer for the Empire State suffrage campaign under Carrie Chapman Catt who headed the New York State campaign for women's suffrage headquartered in New York City. That same year she attended the national convention of the Progressive party in Chicago as a delegate from Massachusetts. The convention attracted widespread attention that year given the unusually high number of women delegates, the number ranging from 30 to 40.

When the campaign for suffrage ended, Garrison became interested in photography which she took up for 10 years. In the 1940s she moved to California to take care of her sister Agnes, remaining there with her brother Frank after Agnes' death.
