= Peymané Adab =

British physician

- Born: Shiraz, Iran
- Education: University of Birmingham; University of Liverpool
- Known for: Public health
- Scientific career
- Workplaces: University of Birmingham; University of Hong Kong
- Thesis: Cervical cancer screening : public health implications for Hong Kong (2002)

Peymané Adab is a British physician who is a Professor of Public Health at the University of Birmingham. She leads the Institute of Applied Health Research Chronic Disease Management Team. Adab investigates the epidemiology and management of obesity and chronic obstructive pulmonary disease.

== Early life and education ==
Adab was born in Shiraz, Iran and moved to the UK aged 9. She grew up in Macclesfield. She studied medicine at the University of Liverpool, before moving to the University of Birmingham to specialise in public health. In 1996 she was appointed clinical lecturer at the University of Hong Kong. Adab returned to the United Kingdom in 1999, where she embarked on her doctoral research at the University of Birmingham. As part of her doctorate Adab studied the public health implications of cervical cancer screening in Hong Kong. Her research resulted in the development and deployment of a systematic screening programme.

== Research and career ==
In 2004 Adab was appointed a lecturer at the University of Birmingham, where she was promoted to professor in 2013. Her early research considered the impact cervical cancer screening and passive smoking on public health. Smoking and passive smoking are the leading cause of chronic obstructive pulmonary disease. In 2007 she estimated that 2 million people living in China at the time will die from passive smoking.

Adab has investigated the epidemiology of COPD in the United Kingdom. She has studied the impact of diagnosing chronic obstructive pulmonary disease (COPD) in primary care. Whilst COPD is common, it is frequently undiagnosed, and Adab has argued that both clinicians and patients need access to more information.

The World Health Organization have recognised that obesity is one of the most serious but preventable public health challenges. Adab has worked on obesity prevention programmes since the early 2000s. She has said that childhood obesity is particularly difficult to manage as parents often do not "think children can be overweight,". In 2016 Adab investigated the diets of primary school students, and found that they were consuming four times the daily recommended sugar levels; and that 40% of their sugar intake came from sugary drinks.

Adab studied the effectiveness of public health interventions to prevent childhood obesity in China, where the prevalence of childhood obesity has increased rapidly, from 1% for boys and girls in 1985 to 28.2% for boys and 16.4% for girls in 2015. She used Medical Research Council guidelines to conduct the Chinese Primary School Children Physical Activity and Dietary Behaviour Changes Intervention (CHIRPY DRAGON) study, which found that the body mass index was lower and the proportion of children who consumed 5 A Day was significantly greater in the cohorts who underwent an evidence-based prevention programme. The year-long, multi-component CHIRPY DRAGON intervention made use of behavioural-change approaches and family engagement, with a focus on improving grandparents' knowledge of childcare. Adab showed that Chinese children who get less sleep are more likely to have high body mass indexes.

In 2020 Adab was one of a team of researchers who studied the impact of The Daily Mile, a physical education intervention for school children, on childhood obesity. The Daily Mile encourages school students to do 15 minutes of exercise during the school day, and despite there being no evidence of its benefits, has been adopted by 10,500 schools and nurseries around the United Kingdom. The body mass index of participating students was measured at the start, after 4 and then again after 12 months. She found that The Daily Mile had a small positive impact on the body mass index of children who took part, and was particularly cost-effective for girls.

Adab analysed the demographics of people infected by SARS-CoV-2, looking to better understand who becomes most ill with coronavirus disease. She combined two large studies; one looking at the first people in the United Kingdom who tested positive, and another of seventeen million patients in UK primary care. Both studies found that women, white people and normal-weight people were less likely to become infected by coronavirus disease. Adab called for more exploration into how coronavirus disease exacerbated socioeconomic inequalities in the United Kingdom.

== Selected publications ==
- Jolly, Kate; Lewis, Amanda; Beach, Jane; Denley, John; Adab, Peymane; Deeks, Jonathan J.; Daley, Amanda; Aveyard, Paul (3 November 2011). "Comparison of range of commercial or primary care led weight reduction programmes with minimal intervention control for weight loss in obesity: Lighten Up randomised controlled trial". BMJ. 343 d6500. doi:10.1136/bmj.d6500. ISSN 0959-8138. PMC 3208022. PMID 22053315.
- Yin, P; Jiang, CQ; Cheng, KK; Lam, TH; Lam, KH; Miller, MR; Zhang, WS; Thomas, GN; Adab, P (1 September 2007). "Passive smoking exposure and risk of COPD among adults in China: the Guangzhou Biobank Cohort Study". The Lancet. 370 (9589): 751–757. doi:10.1016/S0140-6736(07)61378-6. ISSN 0140-6736. PMID 17765524. S2CID 56491.
- Adab, Peymané; Rouse, Andrew M.; Mohammed, Mohammed A.; Marshall, Tom (12 January 2002). "Performance league tables: the NHS deserves better". BMJ. 324 (7329): 95–98. doi:10.1136/bmj.324.7329.95. ISSN 0959-8138. PMC 64507. PMID 11786455.
- Aveyard, Paul; Lewis, Amanda; Tearne, Sarah; Hood, Kathryn; Christian-Brown, Anna; Adab, Peymane; Begh, Rachna; Jolly, Kate; Daley, Amanda; Farley, Amanda; Lycett, Deborah (19 November 2016). "Screening and brief intervention for obesity in primary care: a parallel, two-arm, randomised trial". The Lancet. 388 (10059): 2492–2500. doi:10.1016/S0140-6736(16)31893-1. ISSN 0140-6736. PMC 5121130. PMID 27789061.
