= Eleanor Humes Haney =

American feminist theologian

Eleanor "Elly" Humes Haney (December 30, 1931 – July 10, 1999) was an American feminist theologian and community activist.

== Personal ==
Haney was born in Milford, Delaware, on December 30, 1931. She died on July 10, 1999, in Phippsburg, Maine.

== Education ==
Haney attended The College of William & Mary, where she received a B.A. in English. She attended Wellesley College, where she received an M.A. in English. She obtained a master's degree in Religious Education (MRE) from the Presbyterian School of Christian Education. She then went to Yale University where she obtained a Ph.D. in Christian Ethics.

== Career ==
Haney held a number of teaching positions at different schools in the New England area: Virginia Union, Concordia College, the University of New England, Westbrook College, MECA (at the time, Portland School of Art), Bangor Theological Seminary and the University of Southern Maine.

== Publications ==
She wrote six books on feminist theology, ecological ethics, economic justice, anti-racism and alliance-building, the most important being A Feminist Legacy: The Ethics of Wilma Scott Heide and Company (1985). Heide was the third national President of the National Organization for Women (NOW).

Haney also wrote The Great Commandment: A Theology of Resistance and Transformation (Pilgrim Press, 1998).

== Awards and recognition ==
Haney was a member of Phi Beta Kappa Society.

She received the Hartman Award from the University of Maine in 1998.

The Bangor Daily News described her as a "theology pioneer" and said she had "a major impact on Maine."

== Legacy ==
The Eleanor Humes Haney Fund (or foundation) is a charitable foundation funded by a grant from Haney. The aims of the fund is to give grants to charitable organisations in the New England Area that strive to:

■ Improve collaboration across a range of groups and constituencies to address major oppressions such as racism, sexism, classism and/or anthropocentrism.

■ Build alliances to challenge more effectively the status quo at any or all levels: local, state, national, and/or international.

■ Create effective ways to achieve social and economic justice.

■ Involve ethical principles that can be transferred to other contexts.

The fund has supported initiatives like :

■ Add Verb Productions (a non-profit organization headquartered in Portland, Mainly that provides health and wellness education through provocative theatre performances)

■ Organizations focussing on LGBT issues like: Charlie Howard Remembered

■ Organizations encouraging civic activism and sponsoring documentaries like "There ought to be a Law"
