= Eleanor Wong =

Eleanor Wong may refer to:

- Eleanor Wong (musician), pianist and keyboardist from Hong Kong
- Eleanor Wong (playwright) (born 1962), writer and lawyer from Singapore
