= Eleonore Schönmaier =

Canadian poet and fiction writer

Eleonore Schönmaier is a Canadian poet, lyricist, and fiction writer.

== Career ==
Eleonore Schönmaier's most recent collection is Rush of Wingspan (McGill-Queen's University Press, 2026). She is also the author of the critically acclaimed poetry collections Field Guide to the Lost Flower of Crete (MQUP, 2021), Dust Blown Side of the Journey (MQUP, 2017), Wavelengths of Your Song (MQUP, 2013), and Treading Fast Rivers (MQUP, 1999).

Treading Fast Rivers was a finalist for the Gerald Lampert Memorial Award, Wavelengths of Your Song was also published in German translation as Wellenlängen deines Liedes (2020), Dust Blown Side of the Journey was a finalist for the Eyelands Book Awards (Greece). The music-theater production Field Guide [to the Lost Flower] in collaboration with the Greek composer Michalis Paraskakis was based on text from Field Guide to the Lost Flower, and was premiered at the Athens Epidaurus Festival, 2025.

Schönmaier's award-winning poems have been published widely in literary magazines in Canada, Germany, the Netherlands, New Zealand, Bangladesh, the United Kingdom, and the United States, including Grain, Arc Poetry Magazine, Prairie Fire, The New Quarterly, Event, Prairie Schooner, Stand and Magma.

Her poetry was chosen for the Academy of American Poets Poem in Your Pocket Day booklet in 2018 and 2020 and for the League of Canadian Poets Poem in Your Pocket Day brochures in 2018, 2019, 2021, and 2023, and for Poetry in Motion 2019 (Nova Scotia). Her work is widely anthologized internationally, and her poem "Weightless" was published in Best Canadian Poetry.

Schönmaier has taught advanced fiction writing at St. Mary's University, creative writing at Mount St. Vincent University, and has worked as a writing mentor for the Writers' Federation of Nova Scotia.

She has won numerous awards, including the Alfred G. Bailey Prize, the Earle Birney Prize, the National Broadsheet contest, the CBC Poetry Prize (finalist) and the Sheldon Currie Fiction Award.

American, Canadian, Scottish, Dutch and Greek composers have all written music based on Schönmaier's poetry including Dorothy Chang, Michalis Paraskakis, Carmen Braden and Emily Doolittle.

Sound of Dragon Ensemble, the New European Ensemble, and the St. Andrews New Music Ensemble have performed her poetry in concert.

== Awards ==
- CBC (Canadian Broadcasting Corporation) Poetry Prize, Finalist, 2024.
- Dave Williamson National Short Story Contest, honourable mention, Manitoba Writers’ Guild, 2023.
- Poem in Your Pocket day contest winner, League of Canadian Poets, 2023.
- Eyelands Book Awards, Poetry, Published Book Category, Finalist, 2020.
- The Antigonish Review's Great Blue Heron Poetry Contest, Honourable Mention, 2020.
- National Broadsheet Contest Winner 2019.
- The Antigonish Review's Great Blue Heron Poetry Contest, Third Prize, 2009.
- Alfred G. Bailey Award 2009.
- Earle Birney Prize 2008.
- Sheldon Currie Fiction Award, Second Prize, 2005.
- Gerald Lampert Memorial Award, Finalist Best First Book of Poetry, Canada, 2000.

== Works ==
- Treading Fast Rivers McGill-Queen's University Press (1999) ISBN 0-88629-361-8
- Wavelengths of Your Song McGill-Queen's University Press (2013) ISBN 9780886293611
- Dust Blown Side of the Journey McGill-Queen's University Press (2017) ISBN 9780773550131
- Wellenlängen deines Liedes parasitenpresse (2020) German translation of Wavelengths of Your Song Translator Knut Birkholz ISBN 9783947676637
- Field Guide to the Lost Flower of Crete McGill-Queen's University Press (2021) ISBN 9780228005810
- Rush of Wingspan McGill-Queen's University Press (2026) ISBN 978-0228027164

== Reviews ==
[In Rush of Wingspan] There is something distinctly musical in Schönmaier's pacing and lineation: a languid, patient attentiveness that allows her slender lines to echo and reverberate. These are precise, generous poems that trust small moments to carry immense emotional and psychological weight.

Dust Blown Side of the Journey is the work of a poet who has mastered her craft...featuring a beautifully elaborate intertwining of images...connections continue from poem to poem...akin to recurring melodies or riffs across distinct movements of a composition...poems both captivating and moving.

The fluidity within the poems [in Wavelengths of Your Song] is matched by the subtle flow between them. The effect is like that of a symphony with interwoven and subtly varied musical statements, and, as in a symphony, the effect is cumulative.

Wellenlängen deines Liedes ist ein großartiges Buch einer ebensolchen Autorin, die es kennenzulernen gilt.
