= Eleonore Poelsleitner =

Concentration camp guard

Eleonore Poelsleitner (born 2 October 1920) was a female guard at the Mauthausen concentration camp in Austria. Born in Unterach, Austria, Poelsleitner became a female overseer at the Mauthausen-Gusen concentration camp on 1 November 1944. She trained under Jane Bernigau and has never been prosecuted for war crimes.
