= Eleanor Prosser =

American theater historian

Eleanor Alice Prosser (1922–1991) was an American theater historian, literary critic, professor, and actress.

== Early life and education ==
She studied for two years at Pasadena City College until 1941, interrupting her studies to work in a wartime plant for several years. She then returned to college and received a Bachelor of Arts in Speech and Drama from Occidental College in 1950. She went on to get the master's degree in English at Stanford University in 1957. That year, she started teaching as assistant professor at San Jose State College. In 1960, she completed her doctorate in English at Stanford. Her mentor was Virgil K. Whitaker. One year later, she published her first book, devoted to Drama and Religion in the English Mystery Plays; it was reviewed in many important journals. Her second book, on Hamlet and revenge, "moved her into the first rank of Shakespeare scholars." D.J. Palmer wrote that it was "an important contribution to our understanding of the play."

== University posts ==
- Acting instructor speech, Occidental College, Los Angeles, 1950.
- Teaching assistant in English and Drama, Stanford University, 1953–1956.
- Assistant professor, San Jose State College, 1956–1966.
- Associate Professor Drama, Stanford University, 1966–1981, full professor in 1968.
- Margery Bailey Professor of Dramatic Literature, Stanford University, 1981–1984.

== Monographs ==
- Drama and Religion in the English Mystery Plays, A Re-Evaluation. Stanford University Press, 1961.
- Hamlet and Revenge, Stanford University Press, first published 1967, a revised second edition followed in 1971.
- Shakespeare's Anonymous Editors: Scribe and Compositor in the Folio Text of 2 Henry IV, Stanford University Press, 1981.

== Articles ==
- The Riverside Textual Notes: A Word of Caution. Shakespeare Quarterly, Vol. 27, No. 2 (Spring, 1976), pp. 193–199.
- Hamlet Brainwashed, Letter to The New York Review of Books (reply by Frank Kermode).

== Acting ==
She acted with the Ashland Shakespeare Festival from 1952 to 1954, playing Beatrice in Much Ado about Nothing, Portia in Julius Caesar, and Hermione in The Winter's Tale. She had the leading role in Molière's The Learned Ladies in a 1961 staging at Stanford Drama. She appeared often in Stanford Drama productions. At the time of her death she was working on a book to help actors perform Shakespeare roles.

== Influence ==
The English literary scholar Geoffrey Bullough (King's College London) called Hamlet and Revenge "a fascinating, brilliantly argued, and provocative book." She examined Hamlet in the context of plays between 1562 and 1607, in which revenge is a topic.

Her 1961 book on the English mystery plays was still being cited more than 40 years later as standard literature.

The 1981 book on the discrepancies in two versions of Henry IV Part Two was more controversial because of unconventional arguments, but critics received it thankfully nonetheless. Lester Beaurline (University of Virginia) called it "a well-focused, vigorous, and mostly persuasive work, full of zest from beginning to end."

The Eleanor Prosser Studio, a stage at the Stanford University Department of Theater and Performance Studies, is named after her.

== Awards and distinctions ==
- Walter J. Gores award for teaching, Stanford University, 1981.
