= Eleanor Lyon Duke =

American biologist

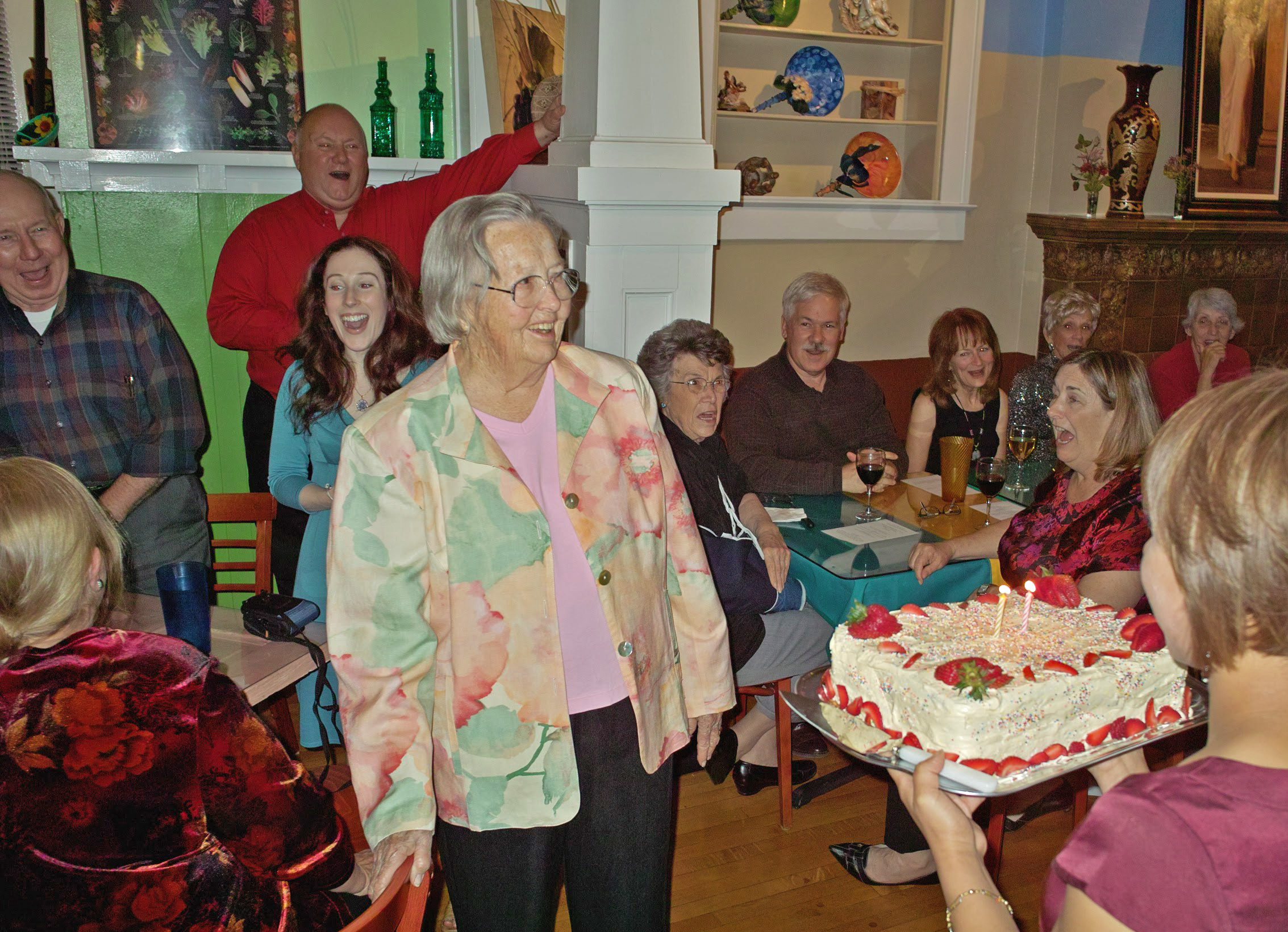
Dr. Eleanor Duke celebrates her 90th birthday with family and friends in 2008, in El Paso, Texas.

Eleanor Lyon Duke (April 12, 1918 – November 1, 2013) was a professor of biology at the University of Texas at El Paso (UTEP), known for her 78-year association with the school and for her sex-discrimination lawsuit against the university. In 1974 she was named UTEP's "Outstanding Ex".

== Family ==
Mary Eleanor Lyon was born in Marfa, Texas, to William L. Lyon Sr. (1890–1977) and Eleanor Ida McCamant Lyon (1895–1991). She was the great-granddaughter of Georgia Supreme Court jurist Richard F. Lyon. The family moved to El Paso, Texas, when she was a young child, where her grandmother Lucinda Nelson McCamant (1876–1968) was one of the first Realtors. Her father and mother had met when Lyon Sr. was in West Texas as part of Pershing's Pancho Villa Expedition.

Eleanor Lyon married Jack Duke in 1939, the year she graduated from Texas College of Mines (which later became Texas Western College and then UTEP), and lived with him in Louisiana where he worked as a revenuer for ATF before he joined the Army and served in China as a military police during World War II. After the war they lived in El Paso, where he worked as a border agent and she went to work for the college in 1948.

With no children of her own, Duke was close to her seven nephews and three nieces – 9 children of her brother William L. Lyon Jr., plus Jack Duke's sister Louise Duke Cross's daughter, all raised in El Paso.

== Professional ==
Duke was known by multiple generations of biology students at UTEP, before, during, and after her Ph.D. research and degree which was awarded by UT Austin in 1967 for her dissertation "Production Study of a Thermal Spring".

Among her works was a 1973 study showing that toxic effects of marijuana injection, observed in more than a few servicemen, was due to contaminants, not to THC toxicity.

In 1979 Duke filed a sex discrimination lawsuit against UTEP "as a class representative of all female faculty members, alleging that UTEP… discriminated against her and other female faculty members in pay, promotion, and teaching opportunities", which she ultimately won, compelling the system to change their policies and procedures.

She retired in 1985, and died in 2013 at the age of 95.
