= Eleonora Hiltl =

Austrian politician (1905–1979)

Eleonora "Nora" Hiltl (21 June 1905 in Vienna – 2 January 1979 in Vienna) was a Viennese Austrian People's Party politician. Before that she had been an educator imprisoned during the Nazi period. After the war she was active on women's issues and received the Benemerenti medal for her Catholic work. Her sister Herta Pammer headed a Catholic women's organization in Austria.
