= Eleanore Wurtzel =

American biologist

Eleanore T. Wurtzel (born 1954) is an American biologist currently at Lehman College and the Graduate Center of the City University of New York. She was an elected fellow of the American Association for the Advancement of Science. Her research interests include studying plant biochemical pathways to provide knowledge and tools for developing sustainable solutions to worldwide Vitamin A deficiency and malnutrition.
