= Elinor Cahn =

American photographer (1925–2020)

- Born: Elinor Bonwit; 1924; Baltimore, Maryland, U.S.
- Died: March 20, 2020 (aged 95–96); Baltimore, Maryland, U.S.

Elinor B. Cahn (1925–March 20, 2020) was an American photographer. Cahn, who became a photographer later in life, was known for her photographs of street and neighborhood life in East Baltimore, Maryland.

== Early life and education ==
Cahn was born in Baltimore to parents Ralph Bonwit and Leona Frank. She married Charles M. Cahn Jr. at the age of 19. During World War II, she volunteered as an ambulance and truck driver for the Red Cross.

It was not until after the war that Cahn began her art career. As a student at the Maryland Institute College of Art, she took a class on social documentary. She began to document her neighbors as part of the class, in a project that would eventually become the East Baltimore Documentary Photography Project. Numerous photographs from the project would be acquired by the Smithsonian Museum and the University of Maryland, Baltimore.

== Career ==
Her work is included in the collections of the Smithsonian American Art Museum, the University of Maryland, Baltimore County and the Jewish Museum of Maryland. She was often invited into the homes of her subjects, where she would photograph them.
