= Eleanor Krawitz Kolchin =

American mathematician, computer programmer, and author (1927–2019)

- Born: 1927
- Died: January 25, 2019 (aged 92)
- Education: Samuel J. Tilden High School, 1943; B.A. Mathematics, Brooklyn College, 1947
- Occupation(s): Teacher, Computer, Computer Programmer, Web Developer

Eleanor Krawitz Kolchin (1927 - January 25, 2019) was an American mathematician, computer programmer, author, and teacher. She worked at Watson Scientific Computing Laboratory at Columbia University to calculate the orbit of planets, phases of the moon, and trajectories of asteroids using IBM tabulating machines. Her calculations were used in the Apollo program.

== Education ==
Eleanor attended Samuel J. Tilden High School where she took an interest in Euclidean geometry and graduated in 1943. She earned her B.A. in mathematics at Brooklyn College in January 1947. While there, she served as treasurer for Pi Mu Epsilon, the national mathematics honor society. After graduating, she applied and was accepted to Columbia University, where she took classes towards her master's degree in mathematics.

== Professional work ==
After high school, Eleanor took a job as a substitute teacher at the high school level at Midwood High School and later at her alma mater, Tilden High.

In 1947, Kolchin was hired to work at IBM’s Thomas J. Watson Computing Laboratory at Columbia University. She was hired along with one woman and three men to take on a project at the Watson Laboratory operating tabulating machines for astrophysics. She simultaneously pursued a master's degree in Mathematics at Columbia while working in the laboratory.

Kolchin was tabulating supervisor in the laboratory and taught in Columbia's astronomy department.

She was the first woman to contribute to Columbia Engineering Quarterly.

In 1949, she published an article describing the Watson Lab’s work. It has since been translated into over 20 languages.

== Publications ==
- Krawitz, Eleanor, "Punched Card Mathematical Tables on Standard IBM Equipment", Proceedings, Industrial Computation Seminar, IBM, New York (Sep 1950), pp.52-56.
- Krawitz, Eleanor, "Matrix by Vector Multiplication on the IBM Type 602-A Calculating Punch", Proceedings, Industrial Computation Seminar, IBM, New York (Sep 1950), pp.66-70.
- Green, Louis C., Nancy E. Weber, and Eleanor Krawitz, "The Use of Calculated and Observed Energies in the Computation of Oscillator Strengths and the f-Sum Rule", Astrophysical Journal, Vol.113 No.3 (May 1951), pp.690-696.
- Green, Louis C., Marjorie M. Mulder, Paul C. Milner, Margaret N. Lewis, John W. Woll, Jr., Eleanor K. Kolchin, and David Mace, "Analysis of the Three Parameter Wave Function of Hylleraas for the He i Ground State in Terms of Central Field Wave Functions", Physical Review 96, 319, 15 October 1954.
- Green, Louis C., Satoshi Matsushima, Cynthia Stephens, Eleanor K. Kolchin, Majorie M. Kohler, Yenking Wang, Barbara B. Baldwin, and Robert J. Wisner, "Effect on the Energy of Increased Flexibility in the Separable Factor of Hylleraas-Type Atomic Wave Functions from H− to O VII", Physical Review 112, 1187, 15 November 1958.
- Green, Louis C.; Matsushima, Satoshi; Kolchin, Eleanor K., "Tables of the Continuum Wave Functions for Hydrogen", Astrophysical Journal Supplement, vol. 3, November 1958, p. 459.
- Green, Louis C., Cynthia Stephens, Eleanor K. Kolchin, et al., "He I Ground‐State Wave Function of the Form ψ=f(r1)f(r2)g(r12)", Journal of Chemical Physics 30, 1061 (1959).
- Green, Louis C., Eleanor K. Kolchin, Norma C. Johnson, "Wave Functions for the Excited States of Neutral Helium", Physical Review 139(2A):363-378, July 1965.
- Green, Louis C., Eleanor K. Kolchin, "Equi-density surfaces in synchronously rotating close binaries built on polytropic model ν=3", Astrophysics and Space Science, Issue 2, April 1973, pp. 285–288.

== Recognition ==
In 2014, she was presented The National Center for Women & Information Technology's Pioneer Award.
