= Eleanor Myers =

American archaeologist

Eleanor Emlen Myers (1925 – December 1996) was an American archaeologist.

Myers had a twenty-year career as an educator, punctuated by overseas work with the American Friends Service Committee and a period with the Michigan Department of Social Services. She became interested in archaeology in the 1970s and began collaborating with her husband, J. Wilson Myers. Photography was Myers's specialty in the field. Over the course of a two-decade career, she produced a series of exhibits, co-authored a number of papers, and co-produced The Aerial Atlas of Ancient Crete (1992).
