= Eleanor Warren =

Eleanor Warren may refer to:

- Eleanor Clark (1913–1996), American writer who married Robert Penn Warren
- Eleanor Warren (cellist) (1919–2005), British cellist and music producer

== See also ==
- Elinor Remick Warren (1900–1991), American composer and pianist
