= Eleonora Catsigeras =

Uruguayan mathematician (born 1956)

Eleonora Dolores Catsigeras García (born 1956) is a Uruguayan mathematician who specializes in dynamical systems and is a winner of the L'Oréal-UNESCO Award for Women in Science in 2014, with her project Neurodynamics. She completed the Doctorate in Sciences at the National Institute of Pure and Applied Mathematics in Rio de Janeiro since 1991, obtaining the title in 1995. She later began working as a teacher at the Institute of Mathematics and Statistics of the University of the Republic, where she became professor.

== Awards ==
- Special Mention at the Pedeciba-UNDP Caldeyro Barcia Awards (1999)
- L'Oréal-UNESCO Award for Women in Science (2014)
