= Eleanor M. Hosley =

American social worker

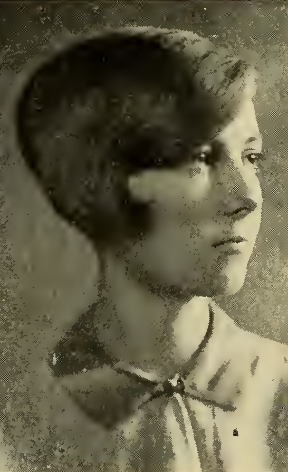
- Eleanor M. Hosley, from the 1927 yearbook of Wellesley College
- Born: February 18, 1906; Newton, Massachusetts
- Died: June 6, 1997 (aged 91); Beverly, Massachusetts
- Occupation: Social worker

Eleanor Merriam Hosley (February 18, 1906 – June 6, 1997) was an American social worker based in Cleveland, Ohio, where she was director of the Day Nursery Association from the 1940s until 1971. She worked with psychoanalyst Anny Rosenberg Katan, and was a co-founder of the Cleveland Center for Child Development in 1960.

== Early life and education ==
Hosley was born in Newton, Massachusetts, the daughter of Walter Alexis Hosley and Caroline Simmons Eddy Hosley. Her mother, a Smith College graduate, was president of the Consumers' League of Massachusetts, and her father was a Harvard-trained medical doctor. Her grandmother founded and ran the day nursery in Springfield, Massachusetts. She graduated from Newton High School in 1923, and from Wellesley College in 1927.

== Career ==
Hosley was a social worker based in Cleveland. She taught child development courses at Western Reserve University School of Medicine, and was director of the Day Nursery Association of Cleveland from the 1940s until her retirement in 1971. She published a handbook, A Manual for the Beginning Worker in a Day Nursery (1946). In 1960 she was co-founder of the Cleveland Center for Child Development, with Anny Rosenberg Katan and Robert A. Furman. She spoke at professional conferences and to community organizations on the importance of quality child care. "Inadequacy of public assistance grants and making scapegoats of people who receive them, including their children, also does severe damage to some young children of a kind that is not easily repaired," she said in 1963.

== Publications ==
In addition to her handbook for day nursery workers, Hosley published in academic and professional journals including The Family, Child Welfare, The Journal of Nursery Education, The Annals of the American Academy of Political and Social Science, and Young Children.

- "The Day Nursery's Function in Supportive Treatment" (1943, with Marcella S. Farrar)
- A Manual for the Beginning Worker in a Day Nursery (1946, 1949)
- "Case Work in Day Care Centers" (1951)
- "Individualizing the Day Nursery Program for the Child" (1954)
- "Community Responsibility for Housing Day Care Centers" (1960)
- "Part-Time Care: The Daycare Problem" (1964)
- "A Joint Approach in Working with Parents" (1964)
- "The Long Day" (1965)
- "Group Day Care a Service any Responsible Parent Might Need" (1965)
- A Century for Children – A History of the Day Nursery Association (1998, published posthumously by the Hannah Perkins Center for Child Development)

== Personal life ==
Hosley died in 1997, at the age of 91, in Beverly, Massachusetts. The Hanna Perkins Center for Child Development in Cleveland presents the Eleanor M. Hosley Memorial Award to professionals who demonstrate 'kind, effective consideration of the needs, feelings and rights of children".
