= Elinor Langton-Boyle =

American businesswoman, journalist in Hawaii (1865–1946)

- Born: Elinor Alice Veilleux; June 13, 1865; Irasburg, Vermont, United States
- Died: July 13, 1946 (aged 81); Honolulu, Territory of Hawaii
- Other name: Ma Boyle
- Education: Punahou School
- Occupations: Businesswoman, journalist
- Spouse(s): William Langton, James S. Boyle

Elinor Alice Veilleux Langton–Boyle (née Elinor Alice Veilleux; June 13, 1865 – July 13, 1946), also known as Ma Boyle, was an American-born Hawaiian businesswoman and journalist, who operated the Paradise of the Pacific magazine from 1902 to 1944.

== Life and career ==
Elinor Alice Veilleux was born on June 13, 1865, in Irasburg, Vermont. She moved to Honolulu, Hawaii, in 1900.

While the magazine Paradise of the Pacific had been founded by King Kalākaua in 1888, Boyle-Langton and her husband, William Langton, took ownership and began publishing the paper four years after arrival in 1904. Even after the death of her husband in 1910, and during her second marriage to James S. Boyle, she continued to publish the paper until health issues (sustained from a fall) required she stop in 1944. After long serving as its proprietor, she sold the magazine to fourteen of its employees.

Her husband died in 1945, and she died on 13 July 1946, in her home in Honolulu. In death, the Honolulu Sunday Advertiser described her as kamaʻāina, literally meaning a child of the land.

As the owner of the magazine, it circulated widely both inside and outside of Hawaii. Described by a contemporary of hers, Maile Kearns, as a "pioneer" in color reproductions of artwork for magazines, she routinely solicited artists to create color covers for the magazine (often reproductions) and selected them herself: For Kearns, this was a defining element of Boyle-Langton's ownership of the magazine. Under her leadership, the magazine was largely full of color, and it devoted significant attention to topics relevant to Hawaii. At one point, Paradise of the Pacific may have been among the largest printing plants owned and run by a woman in the United States.
