= Eleanor Tatlock =

English poet (1769–1833)

- Born: 26 April 1769; Alverstoke
- Died: January 1833; Nottingham
- Resting place: St Mary's Church, Nottingham
- Occupation: Poet
- Spouse: Rev. John Wilson (m. 1814; died 1832)
- Writing career
- Years active: 1794-1814

Eleanor Tatlock (1769–1833, married name Wilson) was an English poet.

== Personal life ==
Tatlock was born on 26 April 1769 in Alverstoke, Hampshire, and grew up in Sandwich, Kent. Her parents were Richard Tatlock (1720 or 1721 – 1777), a naval surgeon, and his wife Elizabeth (1735 or 1736 — 1797, née Smith). She later moved, some time before 1811, to Great Marlow in Buckinghamshire and also lived at Wooburn in that county.

She married the Reverend John Wilson (died 1832), who had been married before, on 5 December 1814 at Matlock, Derbyshire. She died in Nottingham and was buried at St Mary's Church there on 20 January 1833.

== Writing ==
Tatlock said that she started writing because she felt lonely after moving to Great Marlow away from her friends. Her earliest dated poem is "a polemic against novels" written in 1794 and included in her collection.

Tatlock published poems in several religious periodicals including The Evangelical, the Evangelical Magazine and the Theological Magazine, and in Poetical Gleanings. She sometimes published using her initials "E.T.".

She published her two-volume Poems in 1811, including many pieces previously published in magazines. The longest item is a six-book poem "Thoughts in solitude", a "meditative and digressive blank verse poem" which touches on topics including "theology, history, natural history, and social issues such as the problem of fallen women". Tatlock's writing on missionary work, with particular interest in women's work in that field "suggest[s] that like some other women dissenters of her generation, she might have been willing to explore, however tentatively, the possibility of public (if necessarily secondary) roles for women in religious movements. In her "lightly humorous" poem "A proposal" she sets out a schema for the higher education of women, in which they would receive a degree of "Sister of Arts" (SA) and be "freed from household concerns and given the further educational amenity of the Grand Tour".

After she married, in 1814, she appears not to have published further poetry. It has been suggested that she may be identified as the Eleanor Wilson who wrote Catharine and Jane: or Walks to and from a Sunday School [1796] and The Superindendant's Farewell; or, Advice to a Young Female, on her leaving the Sunday School to go to service, etc, 1827, both published in Derby.

== Selected publications ==
- Tatlock, Eleanor (1811). Poems. London: Printed for the author. OCLC 8718130. "Published by S. Burton, 156, Leadenhall Street: and may be had of Williams, Stationers' Court; Hamilton, Paternoster Row; Cocking, of Sandwich; and all other booksellers". In two volumes.
