= Jaime Villanueva =

Spanish historian and writer

Jaime Villanueva y Astengo was born in Játiva in 1765. He was a Spanish historian and writer, and a member of the Dominican Order. He died in London on 14 November 1824.

== Selected works ==
- (with his brother, Joaquín Lorenzo Villanueva), Viage literario a las iglesias de Espana, 22 vols. (Madrid‍–‍Valencia, 1803‍–‍1852)
