= Sant Feliu, Xàtiva =

Church in Xàtiva, Spain

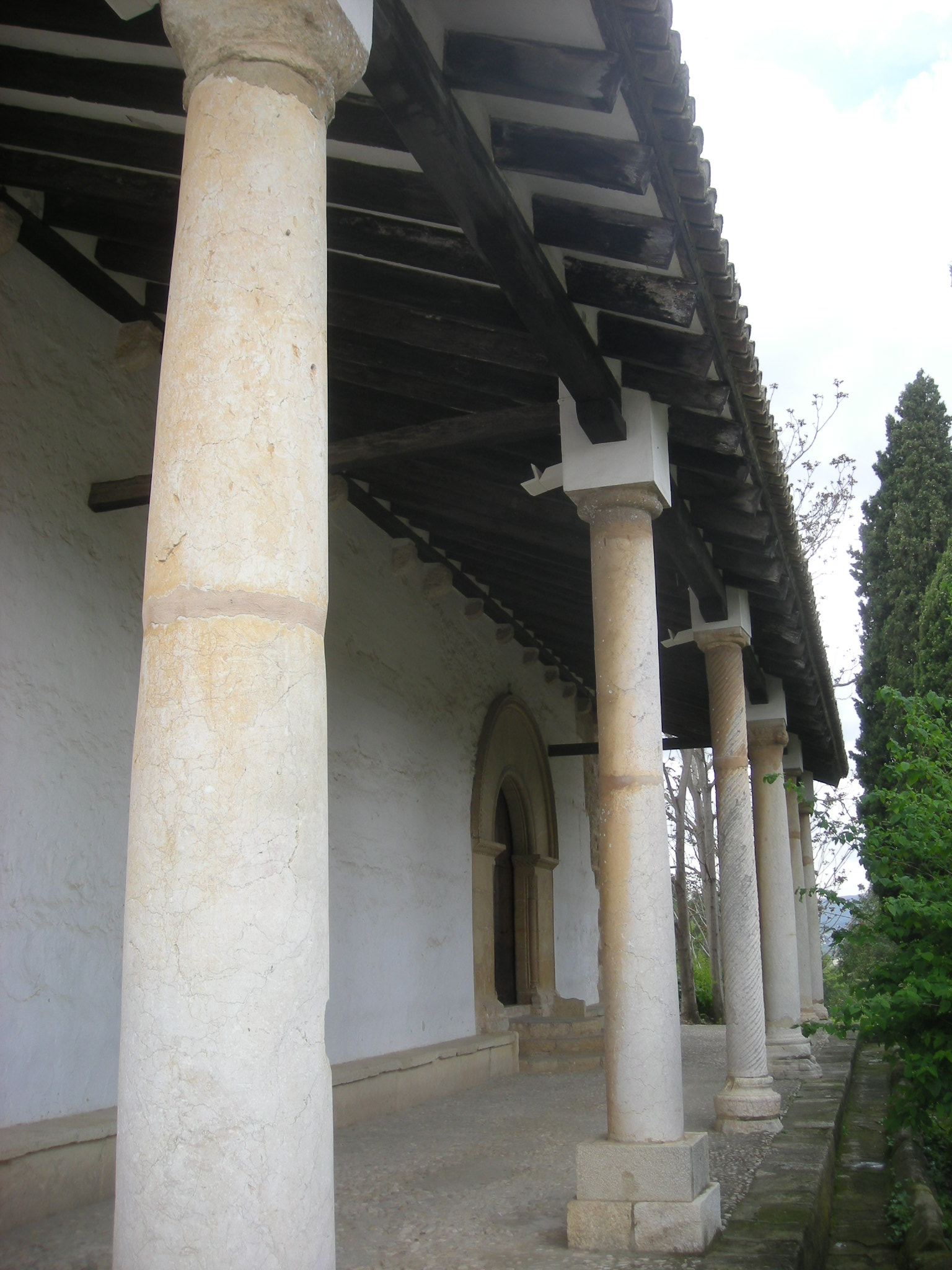
Porch of the church of Sant Feliu de Xàtiva (13th century)

Sant Feliu (St Felix) is a Romanesque and Gothic-style, Roman Catholic church located in the city of Xàtiva, Valencia, Spain.

The church was erected in 1265, after the capture of the town by King Jaume I of Aragon. It is located near Castell, near the lookout of Bellveret. It is sited on the site of an ancient cathedral.
