= Henry O'Brien (classicist) =

Irish classicist and author

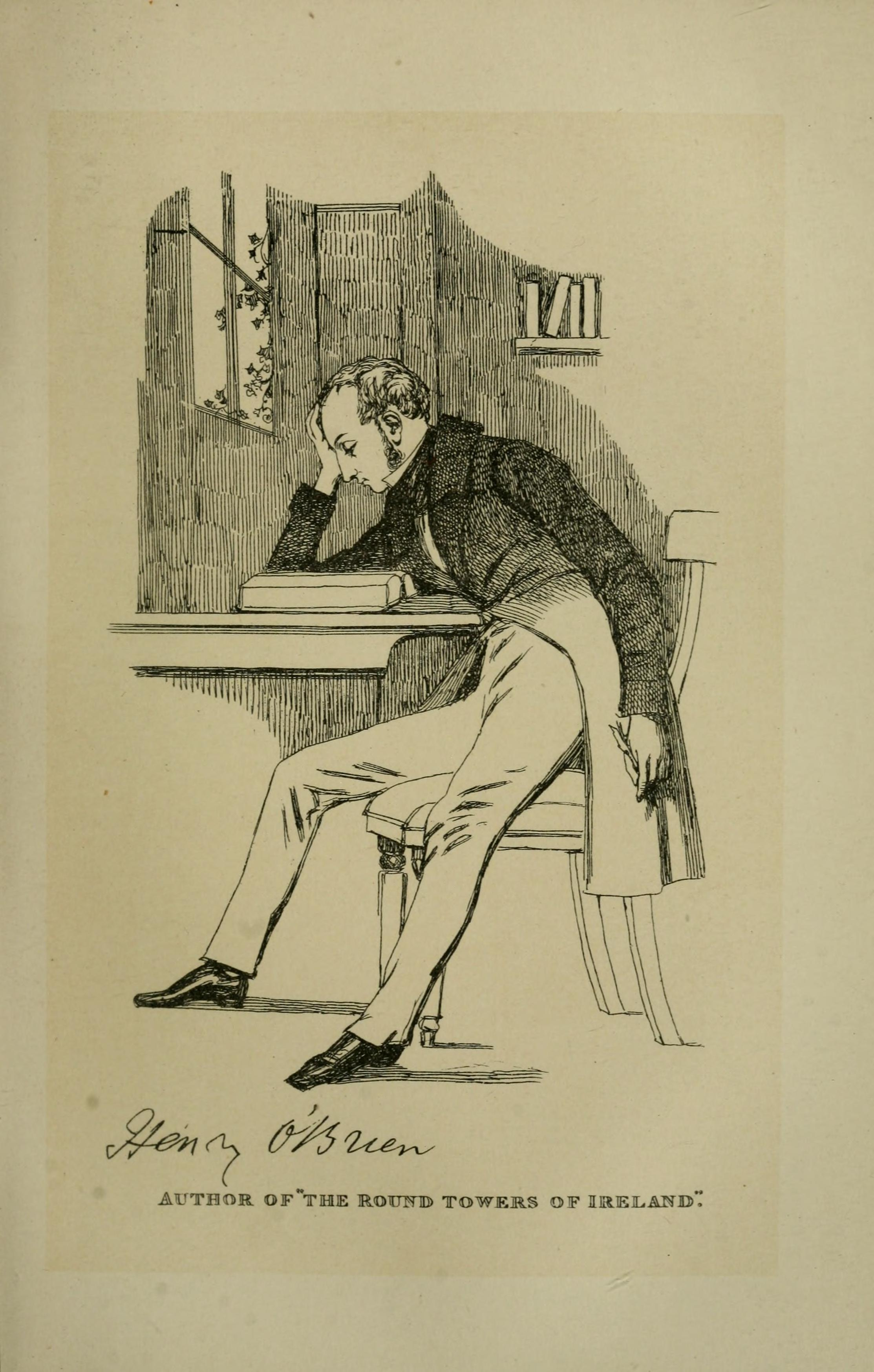
Portrait in the Maclise Portrait-Gallery

Henry O'Brien (1808–1835) was an Irish classicist and author best known for his hypothesis concerning Irish round towers.

== Life ==
Henry O'Brien was the son of an aristocratic family from the west of Ireland. At an early age he studied Latin and Greek and took an interest in ancient Greek literature. Later he obtained a degree in classics at Trinity College Dublin. In 1833 O'Brien published an essay in the Transactions of the Royal Irish Academy entitled "On the Origin and Use of the Round Towers of Ireland" which won a second place reward of £20. Henry O'Brien thought however that he should have won first place and in a lengthy preface to his published essay in book form entitled The Round Towers of Ireland, or the Mysteries of Freemasonry, of Sabaism, and of Buddhism (1834) attacked archaeologist George Petrie who won the £50 first place reward.

O'Brien later translated Joaquín Lorenzo Villanueva's Hibernia Phoenicea into English as Phœnician Ireland but soon after died, on 28 June 1835, at only 27 years of age by "bad health, aggravated by his studious habits", he was later buried in Hanwell, Oxfordshire.

== Irish Round Tower theory ==
Henry O'Brien first proposed that the Irish round towers were created by a pre-Christian phallic cult among the Tuatha Dé Danann who he connected to the daughters of Danaus. His theory when first published caused a lot of controversy at the time, as well as sparking criticism. Today, the mainstream consensus among archaeologists and historians is that the Irish round towers were created during the early medieval period, not pre-Christian period which O'Brien proposed.

== Works ==
The Round Towers of Ireland, or the Mysteries of Freemasonry, of Sabaism, and of Budhism (1834)
Phoenician Ireland (translated by Henry O'Brien, 1837)
