= Tomás Cerdán de Tallada =

Spanish jurist, humanist, writer and poet

Tomás Cerdán de Tallada (also known as Tomàs Cerdan de Tallada) (1530–1614) was a Spanish jurist, humanist, writer and poet born in the Valencian city of Xàtiva.
