= Toni Cucarella =

Toni Cucarella is the pen name of Lluís Antoni Navarro i Cucarella (born 1959), a writer from Xàtiva, València.

He began to work at fourteen years old, doing various jobs, the latest as a postman. Amongst his work are the novels: Cool: Fresc (1987), El poeta (1988), Bogart & Bogart (1993) and L'última paraula (1998), which earned him the Ciutat de Badalona and Critica dels Escriptors Valencians awards. He has also written the collection of stories La lluna vista des de la terra a través de tele (1990) and Llet agra i altres històries com sagrades (2002). Quina lenta agonia, la dels ametlers perduts won the Andromina Award 2003 as part of the 32nd October Awards for Catalan Literature.

In juvenile fiction he has written Els ponts del diable (1995), Samaruc Award for Young Fiction, and El lledoner de l'Home Mort (1996). He has written articles for Levante-El Mercantil Valenciano, El Punt, Caracters, Ciudad de Alcoi, and Vilaweb. At one point in the elections of 2007, he became a candidate for Esquerra Republicana for the Spanish Parliament but has since returned to private life and occasionally published short stories at his blog.
