= Xàtiva =

Municipality in Valencia, Spain

Xàtiva Játiva
- Town and municipality
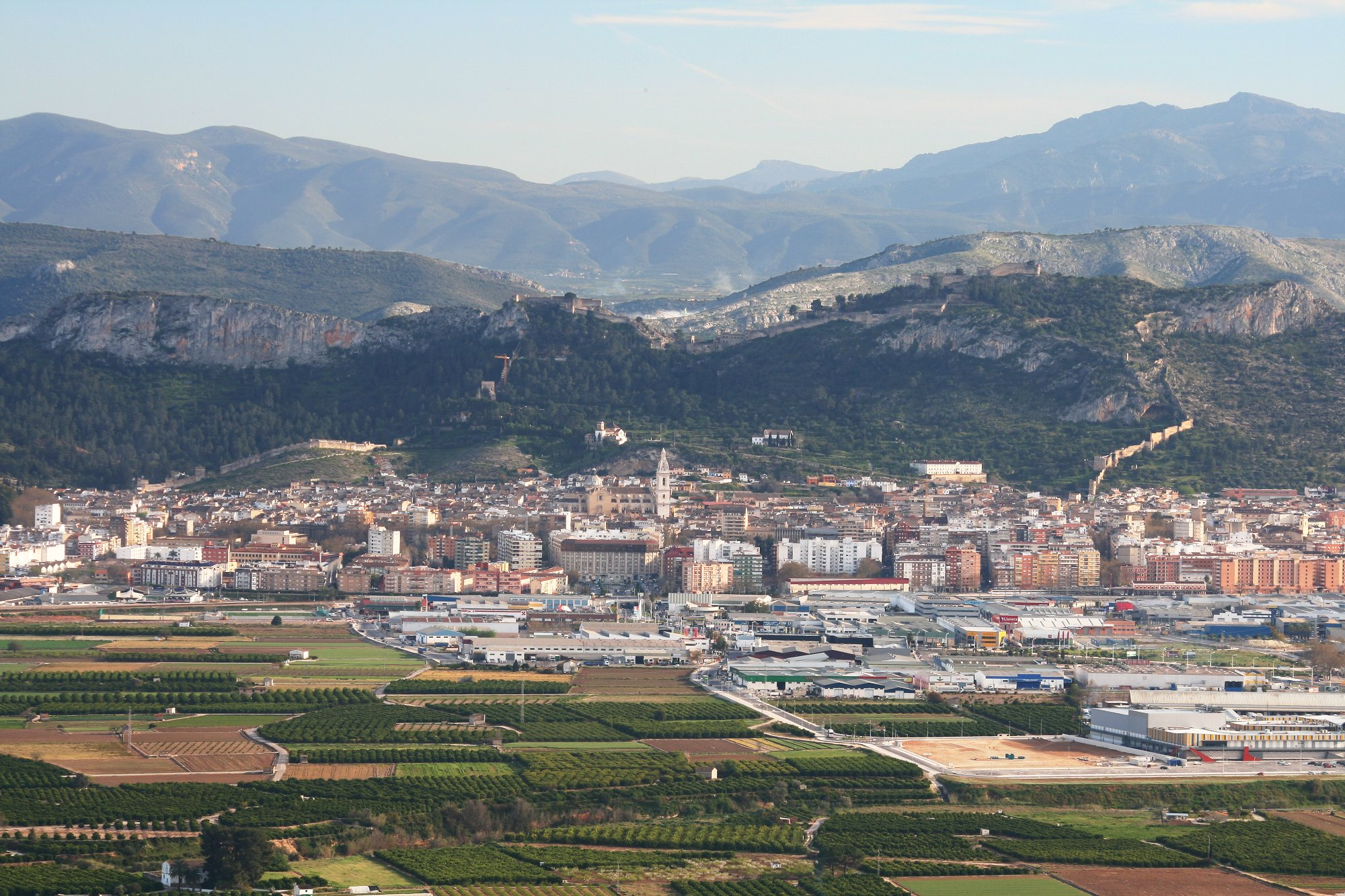
- View of Xàtiva

- Flag Coat of arms
- Location of Xàtiva
- Location within Spain
- Coordinates: 38°59′25″N 0°31′16″W
- Country: Spain
- Autonomous community: Valencian Community
- Province: Valencia / València
- Comarca: Costera
- Judicial district: Xàtiva

Government
  - Alcalde (Mayor): Roger Cerdà i Boluda (2015) (PSPV-PSOE)

Area
  - Total: 76.56 km^{2} (29.56 sq mi)
- Elevation: 115 m (377 ft)

Population (2025-01-01)
  - Total: 31,008
  - Density: 405.0/km^{2} (1,049/sq mi)
- Demonyms: Xativan • xativí, -ina (Val.) • jativés, -esa; also setabense (Sp.)
- Official language(s): Valencian; Spanish
- Linguistic area: Valencian
- Time zone: UTC+1 (CET)
  - Summer (DST): UTC+2 (CEST)
- Postal code: 46800
- Website: www.xativa.es

Xàtiva, (Note: Pronunciation of Xàtiva: Valencian: [ˈʃativa], also [ajˈʃativa] Spanish: [ˈʃatiβa], also [ˈtʃatiβa] and [ˈsatiβa]) in Valencian (known in Spanish Játiva), (Note: Pronunciation of Játiva (unofficial): Spanish: [ˈxatiβa]) is a town and municipality in eastern Spain, in the province of Valencia, on the right (western) bank of the river Albaida and at the junction of the Valencia–Murcia and Valencia Albacete railways, in the north of the Central comarques and serves as the capital of the Costera comarca. It holds the distinction of having the highest number of enclaves in Spain, totaling twenty-six. It is located 25 km west of the Mediterranean Sea. During the Al-Andalus Islamic era, Arabs brought the technology to manufacture paper to Xàtiva. In the 12th century, Xàtiva was known for its schools, education, and learning circles. Islamic scholar Abu Ishaq al-Shatibi's last name refers to Xàtiva where he lived and died. After the Reconquista by Northern Christian kingdoms and the following Christian repopulation, the city became the cradle of one of the most powerful and controversial families of the Renaissance, the House of Borgia, which produced Popes like Callixtus III (Alfonso de Borgia) and Alexander VI (Rodrigo de Borgia).

Historically, Xàtiva was a prominent town in the Kingdom of Valencia, rivaling Valencia and Orihuela during the foral period. It is the birthplace of the Borgia popes and preserves a rich artistic heritage, despite suffering significant destruction in 1707 by Bourbon troops during the War of the Spanish Succession. In 1822, it briefly served as the capital of the Province of Xàtiva, which was dissolved in 1833 following the 1833 territorial division of Spain. In the late 1970s, Xàtiva was proposed as a potential capital for the Valencian Community due to its historical and geographic significance, avoiding tensions between Alicante and Valencia. The city's population is approximately 30,378 (2024). Together with nearby municipalities, it forms an integrated urban area with around 61,000 inhabitants in 2023.

== Etymology ==
Xàtiva is one of the few Spanish cities to retain a pre-Roman toponym. The Iberians knew it as Saiti, which evolved into Saitabi or Saetabis in Latin. Under Muslim rule, it was called مَدينَة شاطِبَة (madīnat Šāṭibat), leading to the Valencian Xàtiva. In 1707, Philip V of Spain renamed it San Felipe. The Cortes of Cádiz restored the name in 1811 as the Castilianized Xátiva, which was later adapted to the academic spelling Játiva. It officially reverted to its Valencian form Xàtiva by a decree of the Valencian Council on January 7, 1980.

== History ==
Xàtiva (Saetabis in Latin) was famous in Roman times for its linen fabrics, mentioned by the Latin poets Ovid and Catullus. Xàtiva is also known as an early European centre of paper manufacture. In the 12th century, Arabs brought the technology to manufacture paper to Xàtiva (Arabic: شاطبة Shāṭiba).

It is the birthplace of two popes, Callixtus III and Alexander VI, and also the painter José Ribera (Lo Spagnoletto). It suffered a dark moment in its history at the hands of Philip V of Spain, who, after his victory at the Battle of Almansa during the War of the Spanish Succession, had the city besieged then ordered it to be burned and renamed San Felipe. In memory of the insult, the portrait of the monarch hangs upside down in the local Almodí Museum.

Xàtiva was briefly a provincial capital under the short-lived 1822 territorial division of Spain, during the Trienio Liberal. The Province of Xàtiva was revoked with the return to absolutism in 1823.

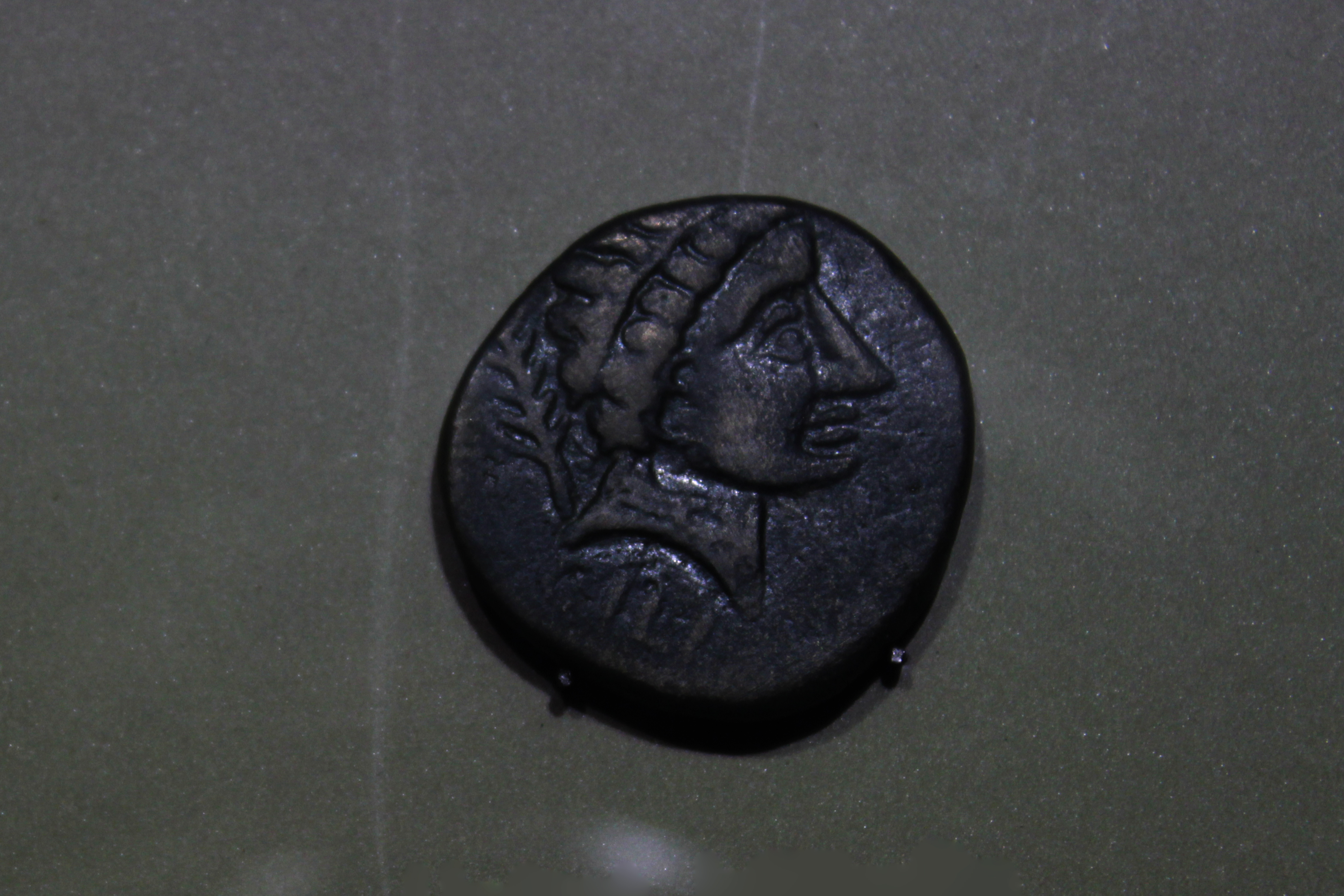
Coin from Saetabi, 1st century BC

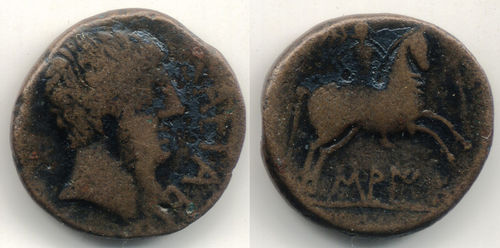
Authentic bilingual Saetabi coin

=== Prehistory and Antiquity ===
Evidence of settlement in Xàtiva dates back to the Middle Paleolithic, as shown by findings at Cova Negra. The city originates from the Iberian culture, known as Saiti (with variants Ibi or Tibi). Due to over 2,300 years of continuous settlement in the same area, ancient remains are scarce, as materials were reused repeatedly, explaining the paucity of Iberian artifacts. The original settlement is identified at the site of the current Minor Castle.

Romanization began in the 2nd century BC, with Saitabi flourishing and minting its own coins, featuring a three-pointed star at 8, 12, and 4 o'clock, resembling the modern Mercedes-Benz logo. It was elevated to a Roman municipium named Saetabis Augusta in honor of Emperor Augustus. During the Roman Empire, Xàtiva was a key commercial hub along the Via Augusta, renowned for flax production and textile manufacturing. The Roman poet Catullus mentions the lintea or sudaria Saetaba ex Hiberis, gifts from his friends Veranius and Fabullus, in his poem 12 (Catulli Veronensis 'Carmina' Henricus Bardon, ed. Bibliotheca Latina Teubneriana, 1973: p. 15.). Few Roman remains are visible, as stones were reused for later constructions, and the site saw intensive agricultural use. Over a dozen cisterns remain. In the Late Roman Empire, Saetabis became an episcopal see, with its bishops attending the Councils of Toledo during the Visigothic period (6th and 7th centuries). In Visigothic Spain, it was an episcopal see under the Archdiocese of Toledo, part of the Roman province of Carthaginensis in the Diocese of Hispania.

=== Middle Ages ===
Following the Muslim conquest of the Iberian Peninsula in 711, the city was named Medina مَدينَة شاطِبَة (madīnat Šāṭibat, generally transcribed as Medina Xàtiba). It became a fortified stronghold, praised by the 12th-century geographer Al-Idrisi for the beauty and strength of its castles. It belonged successively to the Taifa of Toledo, Taifa of Córdoba, Taifa of Almería, Taifa of Dénia, and Taifa of Murcia. In 1094, it served as a refuge for Almoravid troops defeated by El Cid in the Battle of Cuarte. This link to El Cid includes Xàtiva in the Camino del Cid. By the early 13th century, it was the capital of a small Muslim state dependent on Valencia, stretching from the Júcar River in the north to Biar in the south. Xàtiva was a pioneer in paper production in Western Europe.

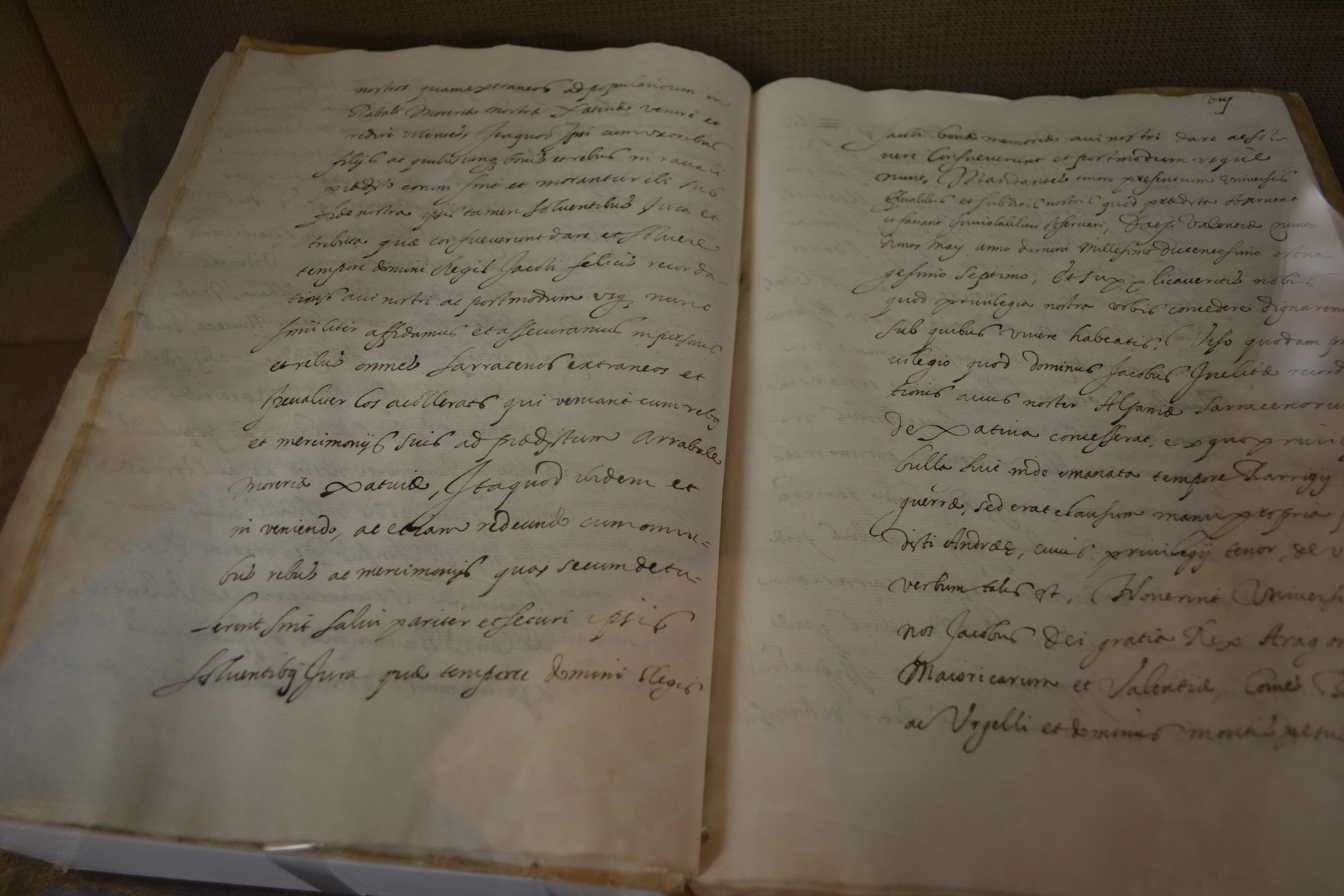
Charter of Xàtiva (1252)

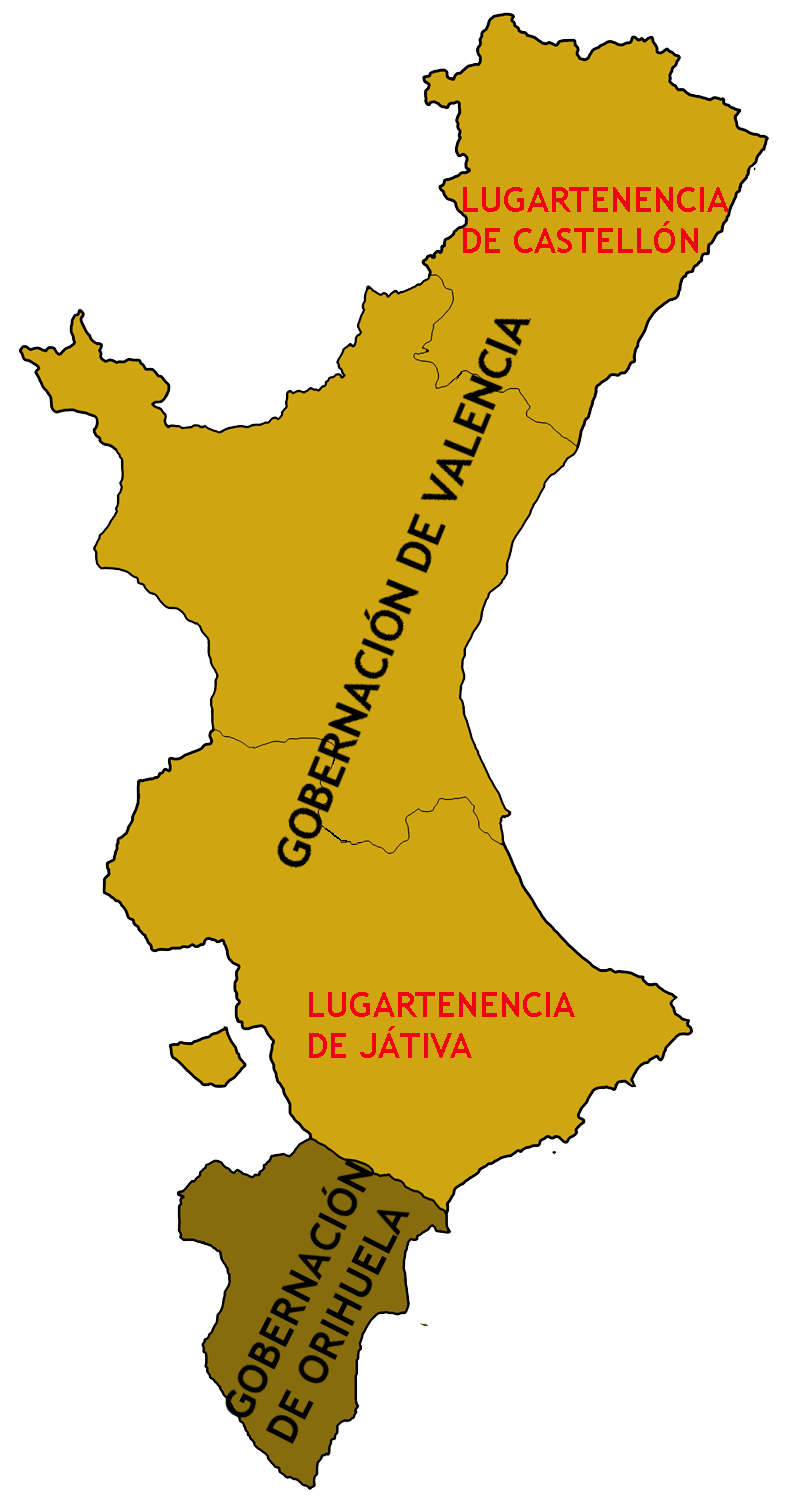
Administrative division of the Kingdom of Valencia from the 14th to 17th centuries

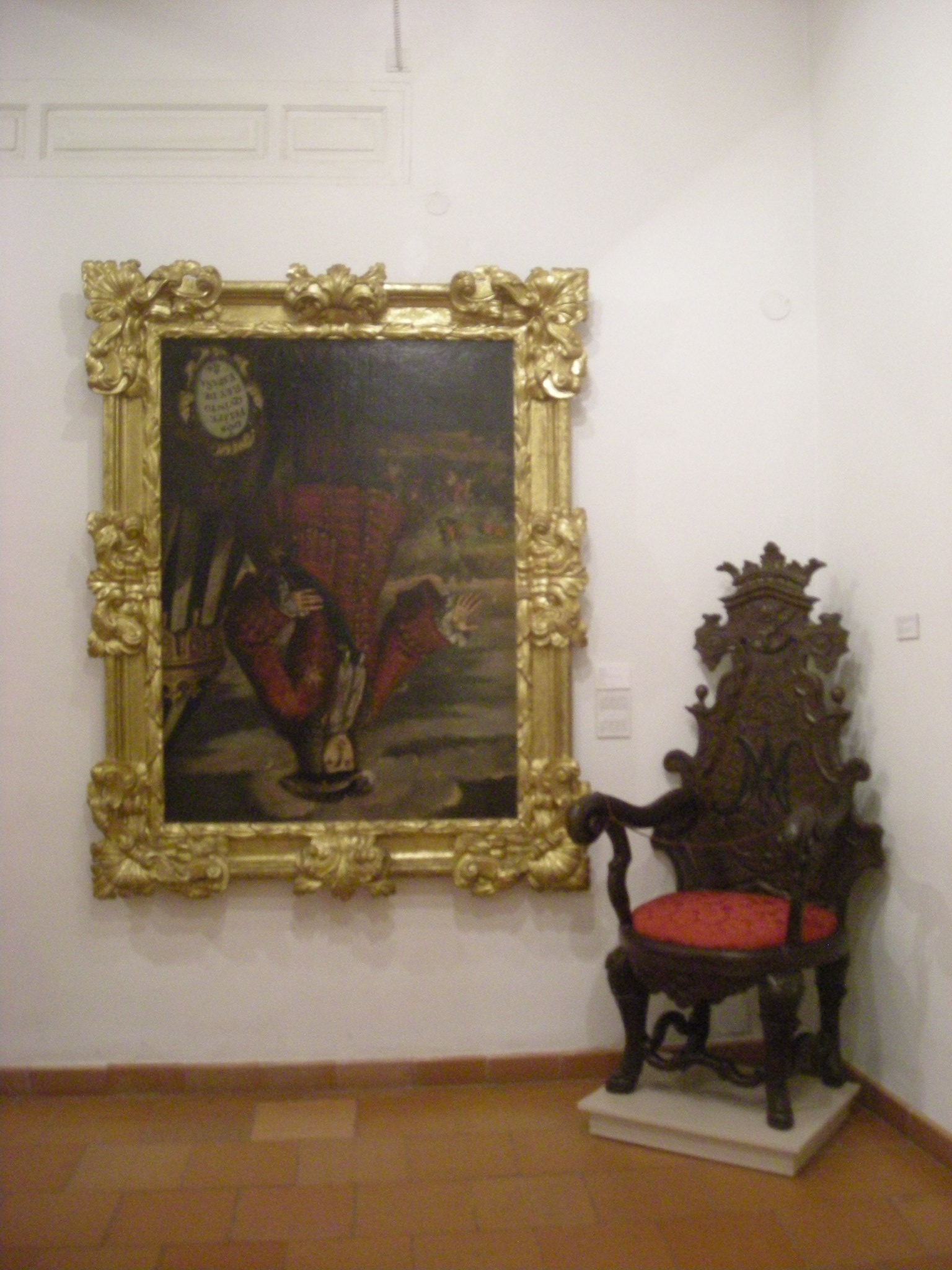
Portrait of Philip V of Spain hung upside down in the Almodí Museum.

After conquering Valencia in 1238, James I of Aragon besieged Xàtiva in 1240 but lifted the siege after a truce with the Muslim governor. Conflicts between the governor and the Castilians prompted James I to intervene again, capturing the city in 1244, shortly after signing the Treaty of Almizra with Alfonso X of Castile. Upon surrender, James I preserved the mosque, which stood until the 16th century. The expelling of the Muslim population was bitterly resented and recounted by the 13th-century historian and contemporary Ibnul Abbar in his book “Al-Hulla Siyaraa” in which he described the expulsion as a ‘blatant breach of the former agreement’. Under Christian rule, as Xàtiva, it became the second most important city in the Kingdom of Valencia, though it did not regain its episcopal status. It led a homonymous governorship. The Morisco population was expelled from the walled city and resettled in rural areas and the San Juan suburb, while the Jews retained their juderías near the Santa Tecla gate. The castle and walls were strengthened between 1287 and 1369, and water supply improved with the Bellús and Agua Santa aqueducts. In 1347, King Peter IV of Aragon granted it city status.

=== Early Modern Period ===
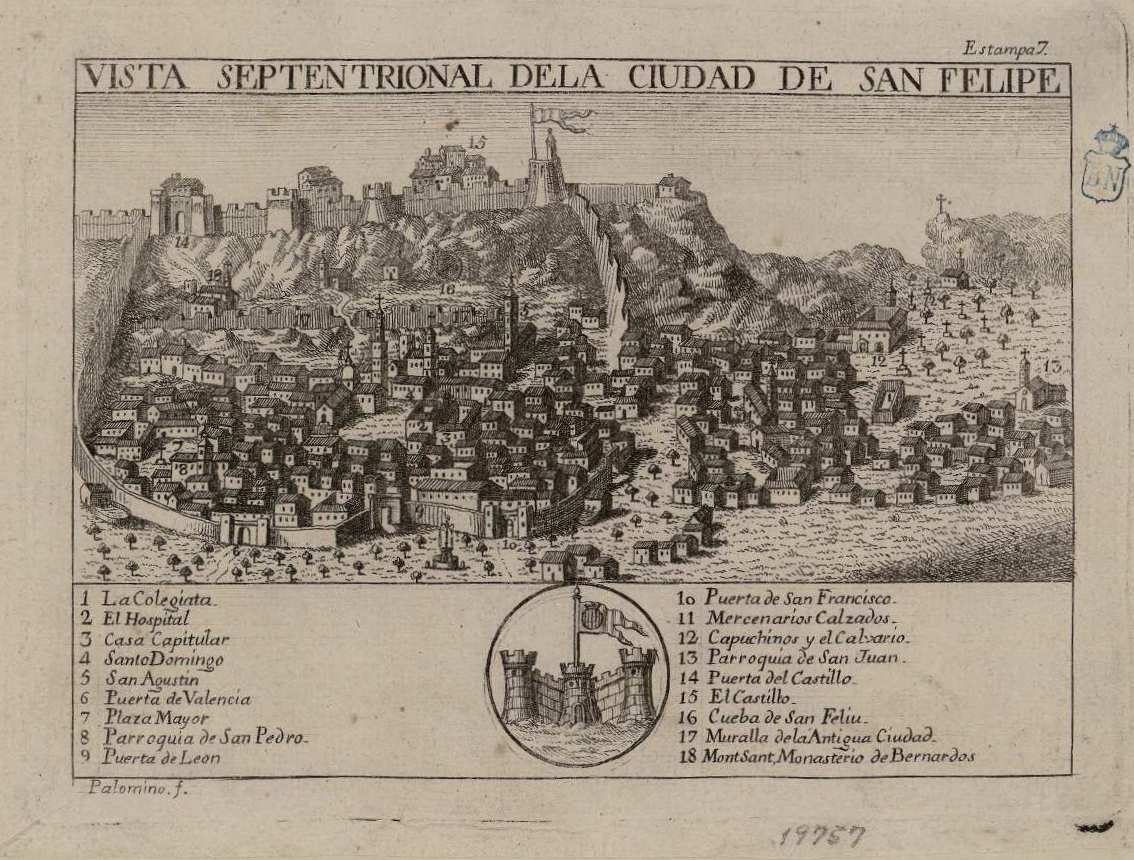
Etching by Juan Fernando Palomino titled Northern view of the city of San Felipe. National Library of Spain

By the late 15th century, Xàtiva had around 8,000 inhabitants and was at its peak. It administered a vast municipal term, now corresponding to 37 municipalities, and a governorship spanning from the Júcar River to Caudete, Biar, Castalla, Xixona, and Villajoyosa, covering 4,750 km². Beyond administrative roles, it had military significance (its castle was the strongest in the Kingdom of Valencia), and economic and commercial functions. The expulsion of the Moriscos led to the loss of nearly half the governorship's population, depopulating over 100 settlements. This demographic crisis, coupled with economic decline and 17th-century plague epidemics, further reduced the population.

During the War of the Spanish Succession, Xàtiva supported Archduke Charles, enduring harsh sieges by Bourbon troops led by Asfeld. The city was heavily damaged, looted, and much of its population massacred or exiled. Traditionally, it is said to have been burned for a year, earning its residents the nickname socarrats ("scorched ones"). A plan to demolish much of the city and rebuild was abandoned due to technical and property issues. The greatest affront was the dismemberment of its governorship, loss of civic functions, and renaming to Colonia Nueva de San Phelipe, or simply San Felipe.

=== Contemporary period ===
Throughout the 18th century, Xàtiva recovered, with 12,655 inhabitants by 1787, prompting new urban works. However, the 1748 earthquakes caused significant damage, destroying the Santa Tecla church and leaving the castle nearly abandoned. The economy declined by the late 18th century, as the new Royal Road from Madrid to Valencia bypassed the city by 4 km (roughly the current A-35 and A-7 route), begun in 1776. In 1811, the Cortes of Cádiz restored the name Xàtiva, largely due to the efforts of Joaquín Lorenzo Villanueva. Economically, the city suffered a major setback between 1810 and 1830 with the near-total collapse of its flax and silk textile industry, leaving about 1,300 people jobless. From 1822 to 1823, it served as the capital of the Province of Xàtiva, though this was not confirmed in the 1833 territorial division (Trieno Liberal), when it was included in the Province of Valencia. The railway's arrival in 1858, with the La Encina new station opened on December 20, 1854, boosted connectivity, between Valencia and La Encina. However, this did not halt demographic stagnation, exacerbated by La Encina disentailment, which emptied convents, and the abolition of seigniorial rights, prompting the exodus of about fifty noble families. The population declined until 1910, when immigration spurred growth, which continued slowly from the 1960s due to rural exodus and Xàtiva's specialization as a service city.

During the Spanish Civil War, Xàtiva remained loyal to the Second Spanish Republic until the war's end, hosting some war industries. On February 12, 1939, it suffered a bombing by Italian aircraft of the Aviazione Legionaria, targeting the railway station and surroundings. The attack killed 129 people and injured over 200, many of them women and children at the station awaiting a military convoy.

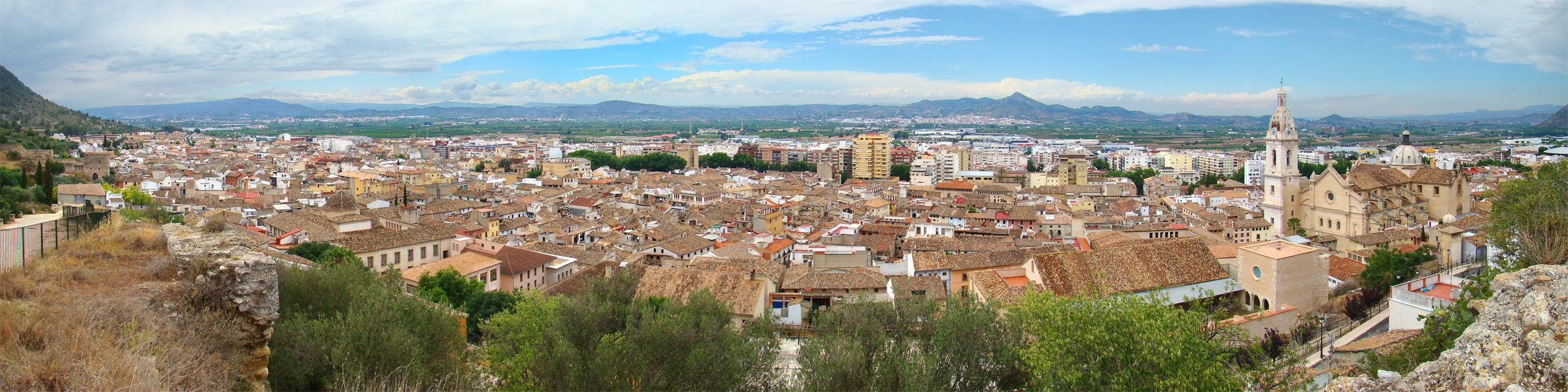
Panoramic view of Xàtiva

== Geography ==
Located in La Costera comarca, Xàtiva is 62 km from the city of Valencia. The municipality is crossed by the A-7 Mediterranean Motorway, the regional roads CV-620 (formerly N-340 between km 838 and 847) and CV-41 (Alzira–Xàtiva), and local roads connecting to Vallés, Novelé, Genovés, Barxeta, Llocnou d'En Fenollet, L'Énova, Manuel, and Llosa de Ranes.

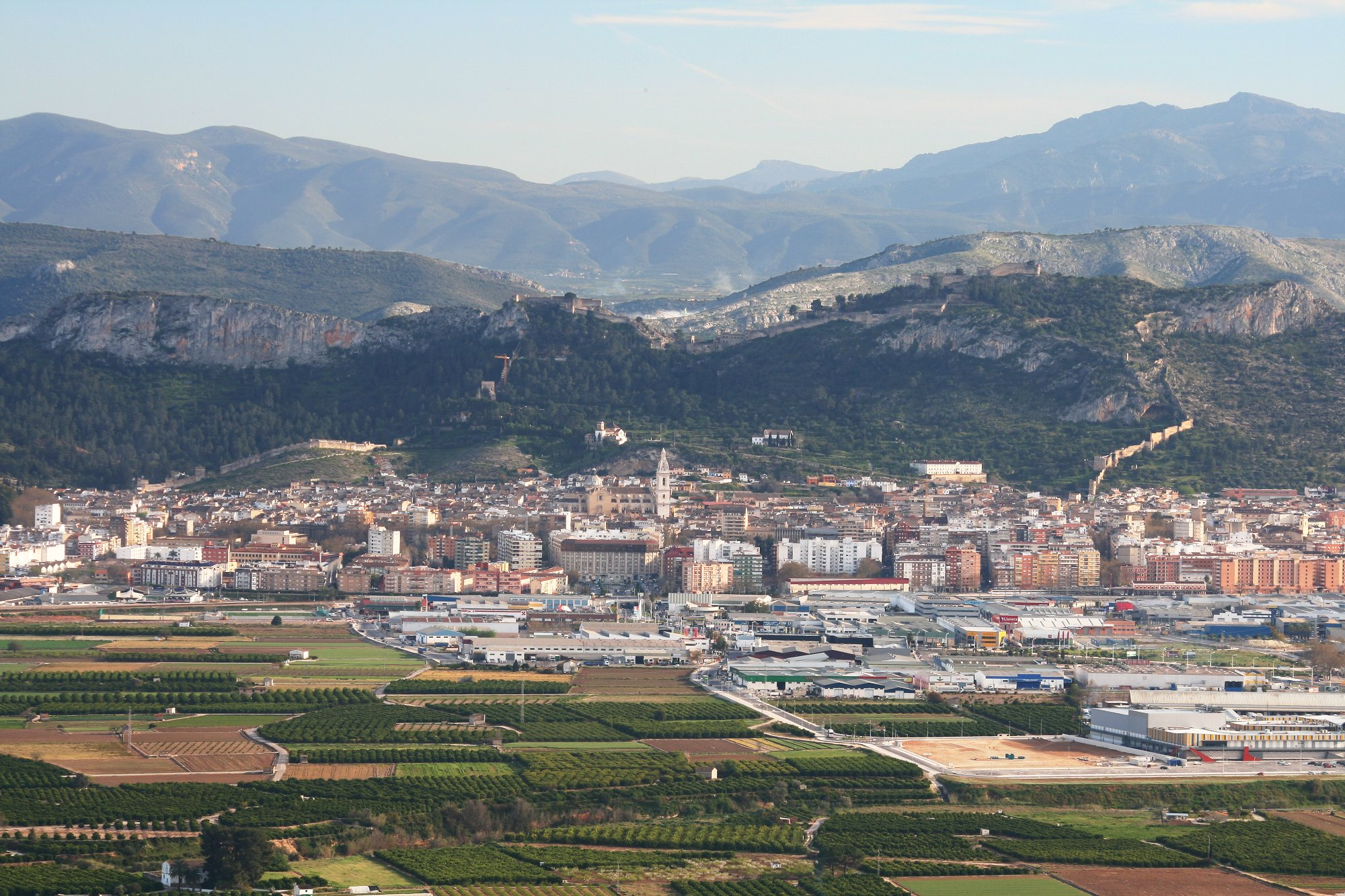
View of the city and castle

The municipality lies in the strategic Montesa corridor between the basins of the Albaida River and its tributary, the Cànyoles River. Its perimeter is highly irregular, with several territorial enclaves resulting from historical segregations of its once-larger municipal term, which included over sixty villages.

The terrain features four distinct units. In the north, the Santa Anna range, a Triassic outcrop, reaches 230 m. South of this range, between Llosa de Ranes and Xàtiva, lies a broad, nearly flat valley at 80–100 m, covered with Quaternary sediments and irrigated by the Cànyoles River, Carnissers ravine, and Albaida River, which waters Xàtiva's fertile orchards. East of the Albaida stands the Puig hill (309 m), topped by the ruins of the Our Lady of Puig hermitage. South of the orchards, the terrain becomes rugged with the Bernisa range, an anticline with near-vertical limestone walls reaching 454 m. South of this lies the Bixquert valley, colored by albariza soils, and further south, the Serra Grossa forms the boundary with the Vall d'Albaida, reaching 498 m.

Altitudes range from 498 m in the southwest (Serra Grossa) to 50 m along the Albaida River. The city itself is situated at 120 m above sea level, at the foot of the castle hill, with some houses extending up its slopes and others spreading into the flatter valley.

=== Climate ===
Xàtiva has a hot semi-arid climate (Köppen climate classification: BSh) with mild winters and hot to very hot summers. September is the wettest month of the year as a result of cold drop episodes that occur mainly in autumn. Despite being located inland, its lower altitude means that temperatures below 0 °C (32 °F) are rare, while in summer it is common for temperatures to approach or exceed 40 °C (104 °F). Summer nights are warm, often hovering around 20 °C (68 °F). Xàtiva also recorded the highest temperature ever in peninsular Spain in a month of March, on 23 March 2001 which registered 38 °C (100 °F).

Climate data for Xàtiva (1991–2020), extremes (1990-present)
Month	Jan	Feb	Mar	Apr	May	Jun	Jul	Aug	Sep	Oct	Nov	Dec	Year
Record high °C (°F)	28.0 (82.4)	30.6 (87.1)	38.0 (100.4)	36.3 (97.3)	42.9 (109.2)	43.2 (109.8)	46.0 (114.8)	45.7 (114.3)	43.6 (110.5)	35.5 (95.9)	32.7 (90.9)	28.7 (83.7)	46.0 (114.8)
Mean daily maximum °C (°F)	16.7 (62.1)	17.9 (64.2)	21.1 (70.0)	24.0 (75.2)	27.4 (81.3)	32.2 (90.0)	35.0 (95.0)	34.8 (94.6)	30.6 (87.1)	26.0 (78.8)	20.5 (68.9)	17.4 (63.3)	25.3 (77.5)
Daily mean °C (°F)	10.7 (51.3)	11.5 (52.7)	14.1 (57.4)	16.7 (62.1)	20.0 (68.0)	24.5 (76.1)	27.6 (81.7)	27.7 (81.9)	24.1 (75.4)	19.7 (67.5)	14.4 (57.9)	11.5 (52.7)	18.5 (65.4)
Mean daily minimum °C (°F)	4.7 (40.5)	5.1 (41.2)	7.0 (44.6)	9.3 (48.7)	12.5 (54.5)	16.7 (62.1)	20.1 (68.2)	20.7 (69.3)	17.6 (63.7)	13.3 (55.9)	8.2 (46.8)	5.5 (41.9)	11.7 (53.1)
Record low °C (°F)	−5.8 (21.6)	−5.6 (21.9)	−3.4 (25.9)	0.6 (33.1)	3.1 (37.6)	7.7 (45.9)	11.7 (53.1)	12.1 (53.8)	7.9 (46.2)	1.7 (35.1)	−3.4 (25.9)	−3.3 (26.1)	−5.8 (21.6)
Average precipitation mm (inches)	61.0 (2.40)	30.9 (1.22)	41.3 (1.63)	39.5 (1.56)	36.9 (1.45)	20.6 (0.81)	6.2 (0.24)	14.7 (0.58)	72.0 (2.83)	21.3 (0.84)	41.7 (1.64)	43.7 (1.72)	429.8 (16.92)
Average precipitation days (≥ 1 mm)	4.4	3.5	4.6	4.4	3.9	1.9	1.0	1.8	4.0	3.0	4.5	3.4	40.4
Source: Agencia Estatal de Meteorologia

== Demography ==
Historical population
Year	Pop.	±%
1842	13,168	—
1857	15,747	+19.6%
1860	14,530	−7.7%
1877	14,412	−0.8%
1887	14,071	−2.4%
1897	11,789	−16.2%
1900	12,602	+6.9%
1910	12,767	+1.3%
1920	14,231	+11.5%
1930	15,185	+6.7%
1940	17,951	+18.2%
1950	18,230	+1.6%
1960	20,224	+10.9%
1970	21,710	+7.3%
1981	23,920	+10.2%
1991	24,461	+2.3%
2001	25,736	+5.2%
2011	29,125	+13.2%
2021	29,655	+1.8%
Population de jure according to population censuses of the INE Population de facto according to INE censuses

Xàtiva has a population of approximately 30378 (2023). Its residents are known as setabenses or socarrats ("scorched ones"), a reference to the 1707 burning by Philip V of Spain. About 9.0% of the population is of foreign nationality.

In 1887, Xàtiva's population increased with the incorporation of the former municipality of Anahuir.

=== Urban planning ===
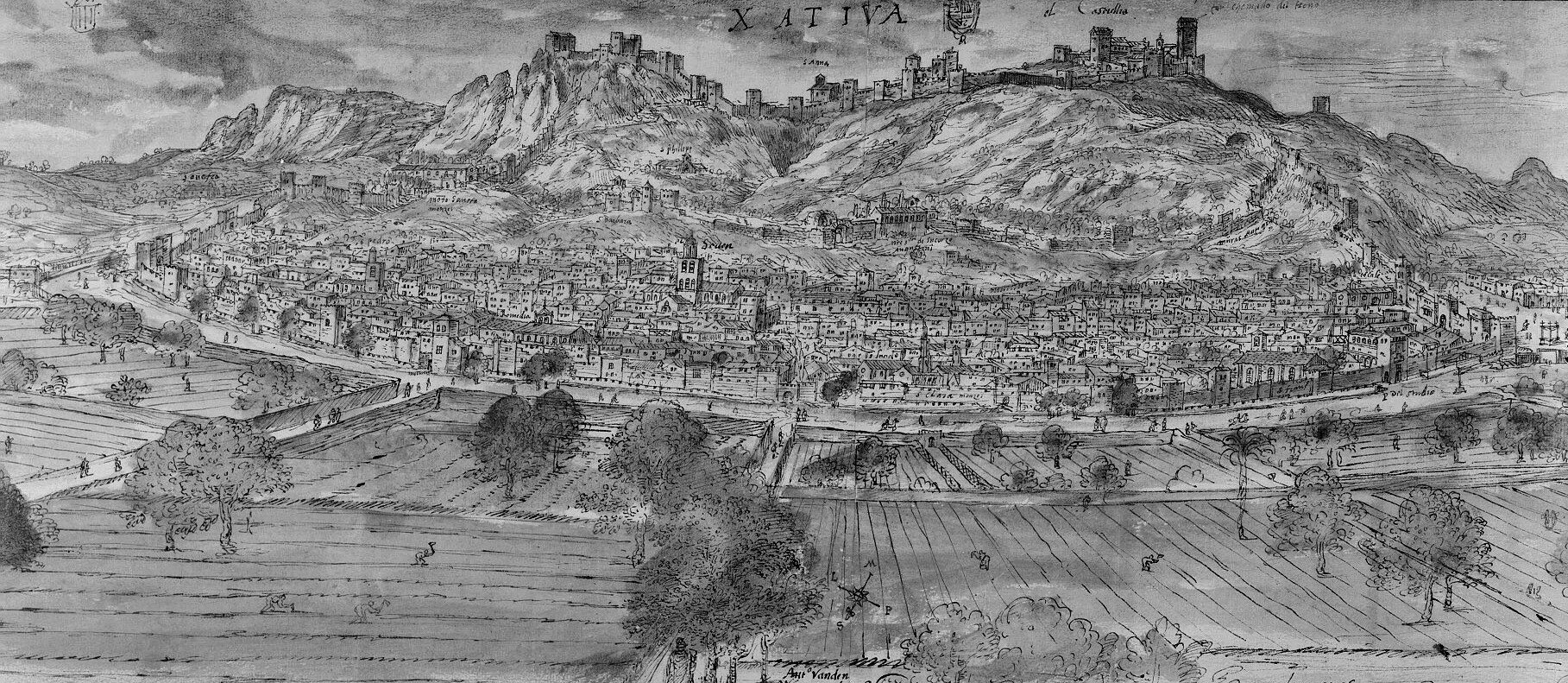
Xàtiva in 1563, from a drawing by Anton van den Wyngaerde.

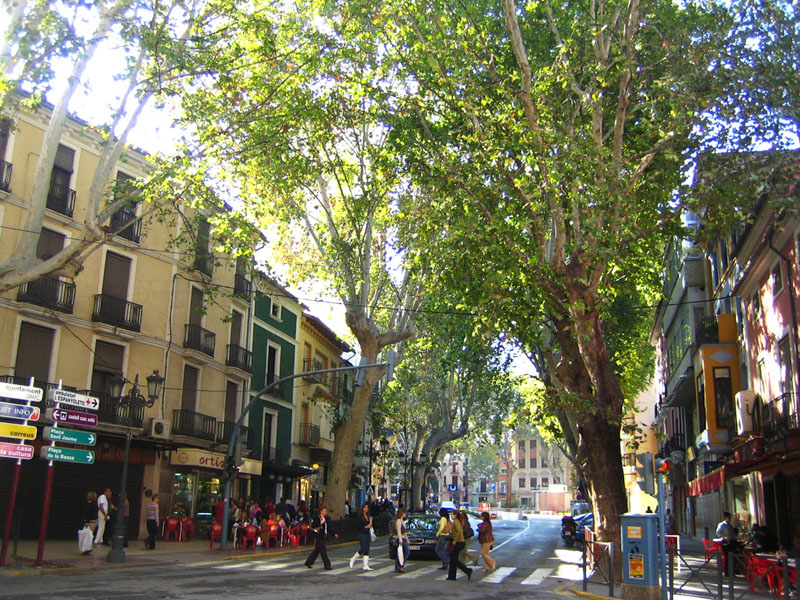
Alameda of Xàtiva

The original Iberian city was located where the Minor Castle now stands. After the Roman conquest, the center shifted to the plain, occupying the now-empty space between the current city and the castle, where the churches of San Félix and San José stand. Remains and records of Andalusian buildings indicate the city expanded beyond the Roman-Visigothic walls. The Islamic medina likely covered most of the current medieval city, with the Aljama (in Montsant) and the main mosque on the site of the current collegiate church. Water was supplied via the Villa acequia. After the Christian conquest, the city's urban layout was renewed with new buildings. From the late 13th century, residents began abandoning the upper city for more accessible areas with running water, turning the old enclosure into a large albacar (livestock pen) and later farmland. The city then remained within the walls' limits, though suburbs expanded, and numerous buildings were constructed until the economic crisis following the Morisco expulsion.

The 1707 Bourbon sieges left the city heavily damaged, but recovery began in the 18th century with the creation of the Market Square and palaces along Corretgeria and Moncada streets. In 1822, the first public lighting with oil was introduced. During the First Carlist War (1837–1847), the walls were reinforced for the last time. The 19th-century demographic stagnation limited urban expansion, but key projects included the Station descent in 1860, the parallel Carmen descent, a new route to Valencia, and the urbanization of the Alameda in 1882, after demolishing much of the walls in 1874. These axes shaped the early 20th-century expansion. Growth first filled the space between the medieval city and the railway, then extended westward along Reina street. A 1934 expansion plan, revised as an Alignment Plan in 1944, guided growth until the 1960s. The 1988 General Urban Development Plan aimed to expand beyond the railway, requiring two underpasses and one overpass. In 1995, access to the A-7 was improved with a new bridge over the Cañoles River.

== Economy ==
The service sector dominates Xàtiva's economy, particularly tourism and commerce. Industry is also a key economic driver. Commerce attracts customers from the comarca and neighboring areas. The Xàtiva Functional Area includes 38 municipalities, with a population of 113,427 in 2009 (2.2% of the regional total), due to its strategic location and excellent infrastructure connectivity.

While 40% of the population worked in agriculture in 1950, this fell to 5% by 2001. Industry employed 20% of the workforce, and construction 12%. Xàtiva has specialized as a service city, with over 63% of its active population in this sector.

== Transport ==
=== Roads ===
The following roads pass through Xàtiva's municipal term:

A-7	Connects Algeciras with Barcelona.
A-35	Connects Xàtiva with Almansa and the A-31.
CV-41	Connects Xàtiva with Alzira.
CV-58	Connects Xàtiva with the A-7 to the north.
CV-563	Connects CV-41 with Llosa de Ranes.
CV-567	Connects Xàtiva with Cerdà.
CV-573	Connects Barxeta with Manuel.
CV-597	Connects the A-7 with the A-35.
CV-600	Connects Xàtiva with the CV-50 at Tavernes de la Valldigna.
CV-610	Connects Xàtiva with the CV-60 at Almiserà.
CV-620	Connects Xàtiva with the CV-60 at Montaverner.
CV-645	Connects Xàtiva with the A-7 to the south.

=== Railway ===
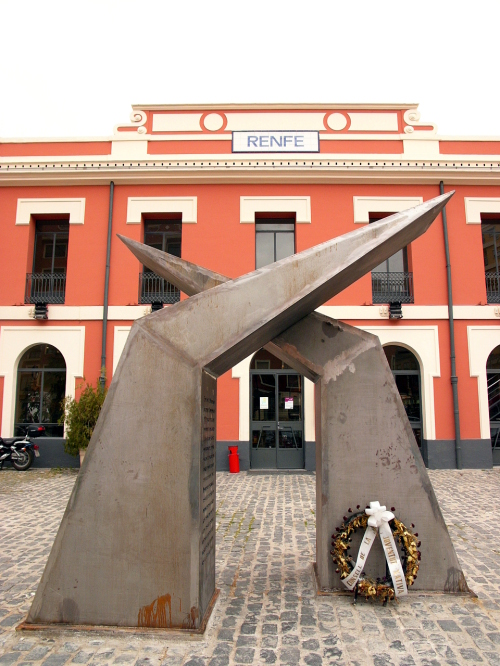
Train station

The Xàtiva railway station in the urban core offers Renfe Operadora services, including long-distance (Talgo, Trenhotel), Medium Distance (Línea 47, connecting to Alcoy), and Cercanías Valencia (Line C-2). The station is equipped for high-speed AVE Madrid–Valencia (via Albacete) trains, currently under construction.

=== Intercity bus ===
Xàtiva has a bus station with lines connecting to nearby towns and cities, operated by companies like Chambitos, La Concepción, and Travicoi. The lines include:

- Valencia – Xàtiva – Alcoy – Ibi
- Valencia – Xàtiva – Ontinyent – Bañeres de Mariola
- Xàtiva – Ontinyent
- Xàtiva – Barxeta
- Xàtiva – Pinet
- Xàtiva – Rafelguaraf
- Xàtiva – Fuente la Higuera – Carcer
- Xàtiva – La Pobla del Duc
- Xàtiva – Adzaneta de Albaida
- Xàtiva – Enguera
- Xàtiva – Bicorp – Navarrés – Enguera
- Xàtiva – Gandia

=== Urban bus ===
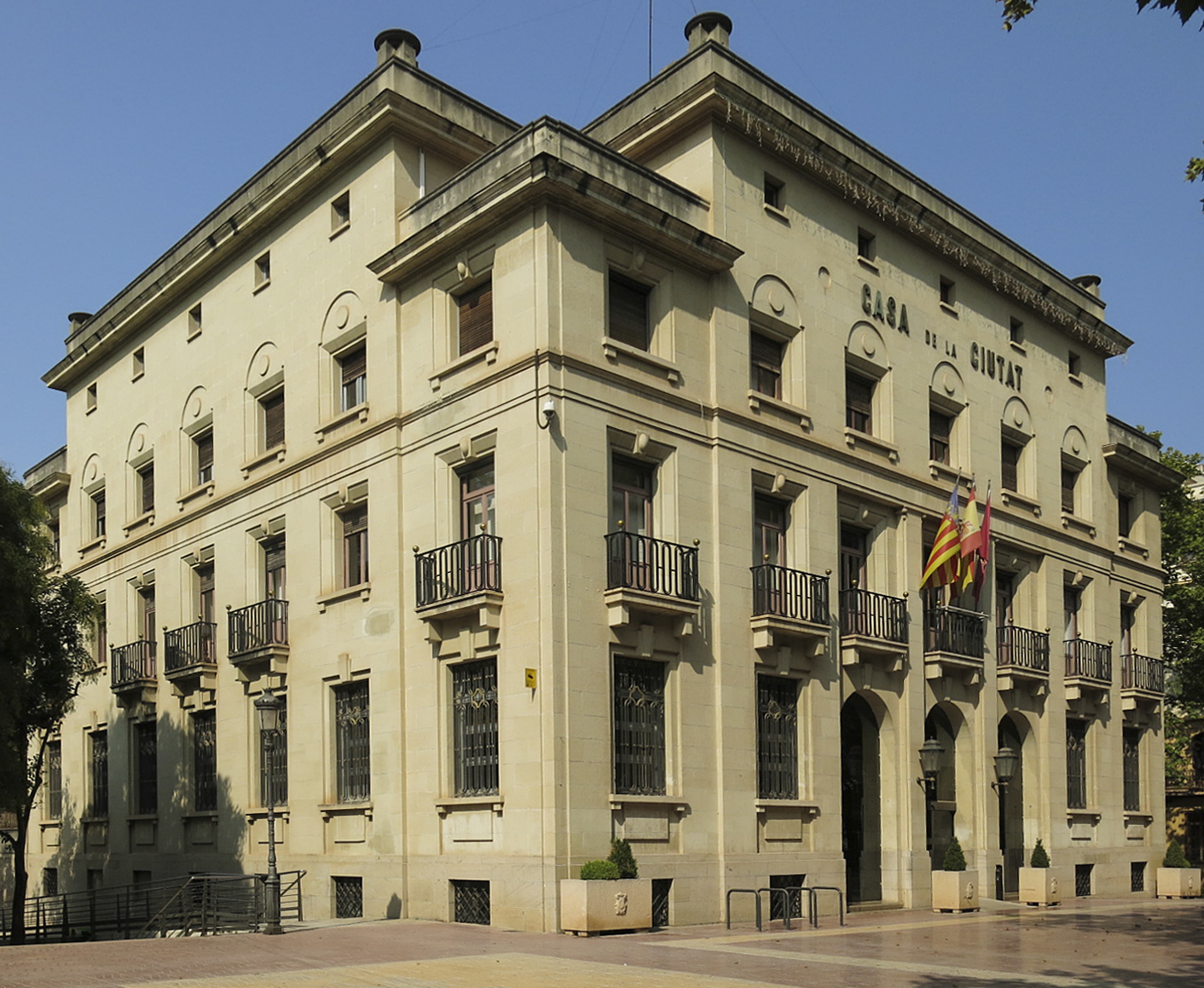
Municipality of Xàtiva

The urban bus service, managed by the municipality, connects various city points with the Lluís Alcanyís Hospital.

== Administration and politics ==
=== Municipal government ===
List of mayors since the democratic elections of 1979
Term	Mayor	Political party
1979–1983	Manuel Casesnoves Soldevila. 1979-1983	Partit Socialista del País Valencià (PSPV-PSOE)
1983–1987	Miquel Calabuig i Adrià. 1983-1995. 1983-1995	Partit Socialista del País Valencià (PSPV-PSOE)
1987–1991	Alfonso Rus Terol	Partido Popular de la Comunidad Valenciana (PP)
1991–1995	Roger Cerdà i Boluda	Partit Socialista del País Valencià (PSPV-PSOE)
1995–1999	n/d	n/d
1999–2003	n/d	n/d
2003–2007	n/d	n/d
2007–2011	n/d	n/d
2011–2015	n/d	n/d
2015–2019	n/d	n/d
2019–2023	n/d	n/d
2023–	n/d	n/d

Municipal election results in Xàtiva
Political party	2023			2019			2015			2011			2007		
Political party	%	Votes	Councilors	%	Votes	Councilors	%	Votes	Councilors	%	Votes	Councilors	%	Votes	Councilors
PSPV-PSOE	34.38	5284	8	41.50	6085	10	27.36	4426	7	27.77	4408	6	29.65	4665	7
PP	34.09	5239	8	15.51	2274	4	21.95	3550	5	46.19	7333	11	50.35	7921	12
EUPV	16.48	2533	4	22.34	3276	5	23.22	3756	5	10.38	1648	2	4.95	779	0
Vox	6.53	1004	1	4.14	608	0	—	—	—	—	—	—	—	—	—
Compromís-BNV	4.58	704	0	3.93	577	0	13.70	2216	3	11.79	1872	2	10.41	1638	2
Citizens (CS)	2.83	436	0	9.31	1366	2	7.08	1145	1	—	—	—	—	—	—

=== Territorial organization ===
==== Hamlets ====
Currently, in addition to the municipal capital, the following population units are located within the municipal term, ordered by their population in 2015:

- Torre de Lloris: 138 inhabitants
- Anahuir: 130 inhabitants
- Sorió: 23 inhabitants
- El Realengo: 3 inhabitants

==== Neighborhoods ====
The city of Xàtiva is divided into twelve neighborhoods, reflecting both its historical structure and modern growth:

- City District (neighborhood around the Santa Maria parish in the historic center)
- Les Santes (former medieval Jewish quarter in the historic center)
- San Pedro (neighborhood around the San Pedro parish in the historic center)
- San José (neighborhood in the historic center under the Bellveret)
- Alto del Raval (neighborhood in the historic center under the Calvari Baixet)
- Raval de San Juan (former medieval Morisco quarter)
- Les Barreres (former medieval neighborhood around the La Merced parish (Xátiva))
- Ensanche (neighborhood north of the city)
- Camí dels Dos Molins (northwest neighborhood)
- Carmen (northeast neighborhood)
- La Murta (neighborhood around the La Murta Stadium)
- Horts del Raval (neighborhood at the foot of the Bernisa range)

== Culture ==
=== Heritage ===
Xàtiva's historic center was declared a Historic-Artistic Site in 1982, housing most of the city's heritage. Within its municipal term lies the Cova Negra natural site, centered around a Middle Paleolithic site with Neanderthal remains.

==== Military heritage ====
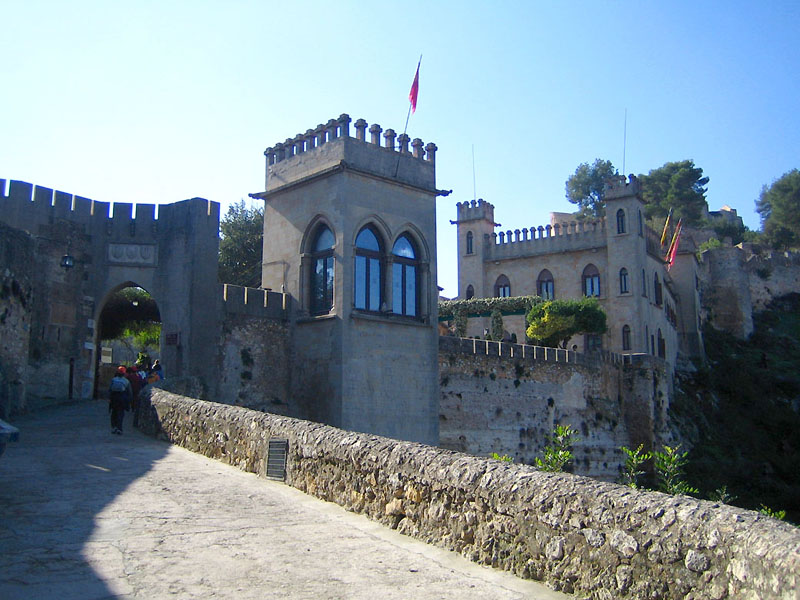
Castle of Xàtiva

- Castle of Xàtiva: Perched on the Bernisa range, it dominates the city. Its core, the Minor Castle, is of Iberian origin, later occupied by Romans, who began constructing the Major Castle. The current complex features mainly Islamic or Gothic architecture. It served as a state prison for the Crown of Aragon and was considered the strongest fortress in the Kingdom of Valencia. From its summit, one can see the city and the Júcar River plain to the north; drylands and the Grossa, Mariola, and Benicadell ranges to the south; the Castilian border to the west; and, on clear days, the Mediterranean Sea to the east. It was declared a National Monument in 1931.
- Walls of Xàtiva: Small sections of the urban walls and hilltop watchtowers remain. Built to protect the city, they date from the 11th to 16th centuries.

==== Religious heritage ====
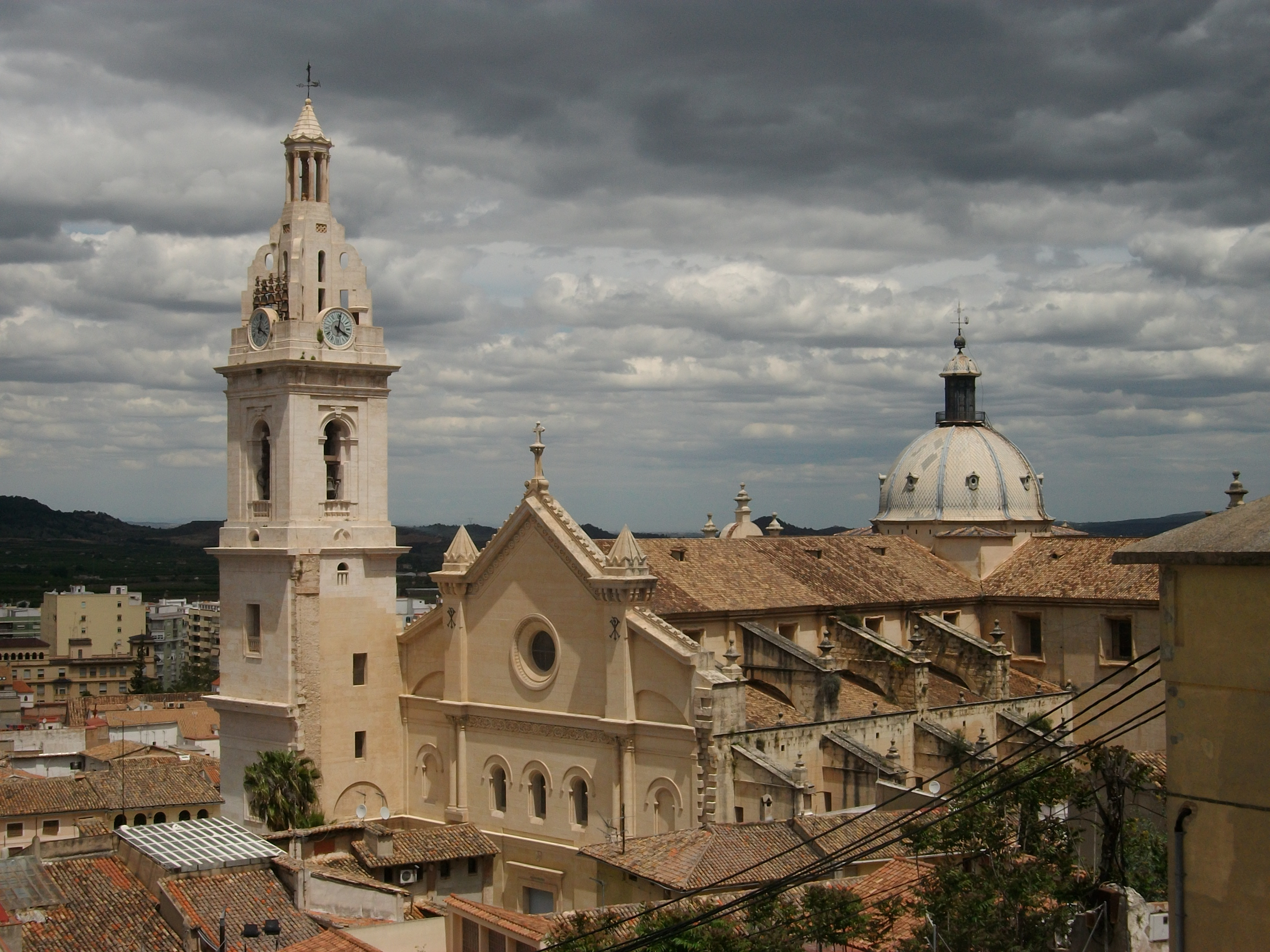
The Seo of Xàtiva

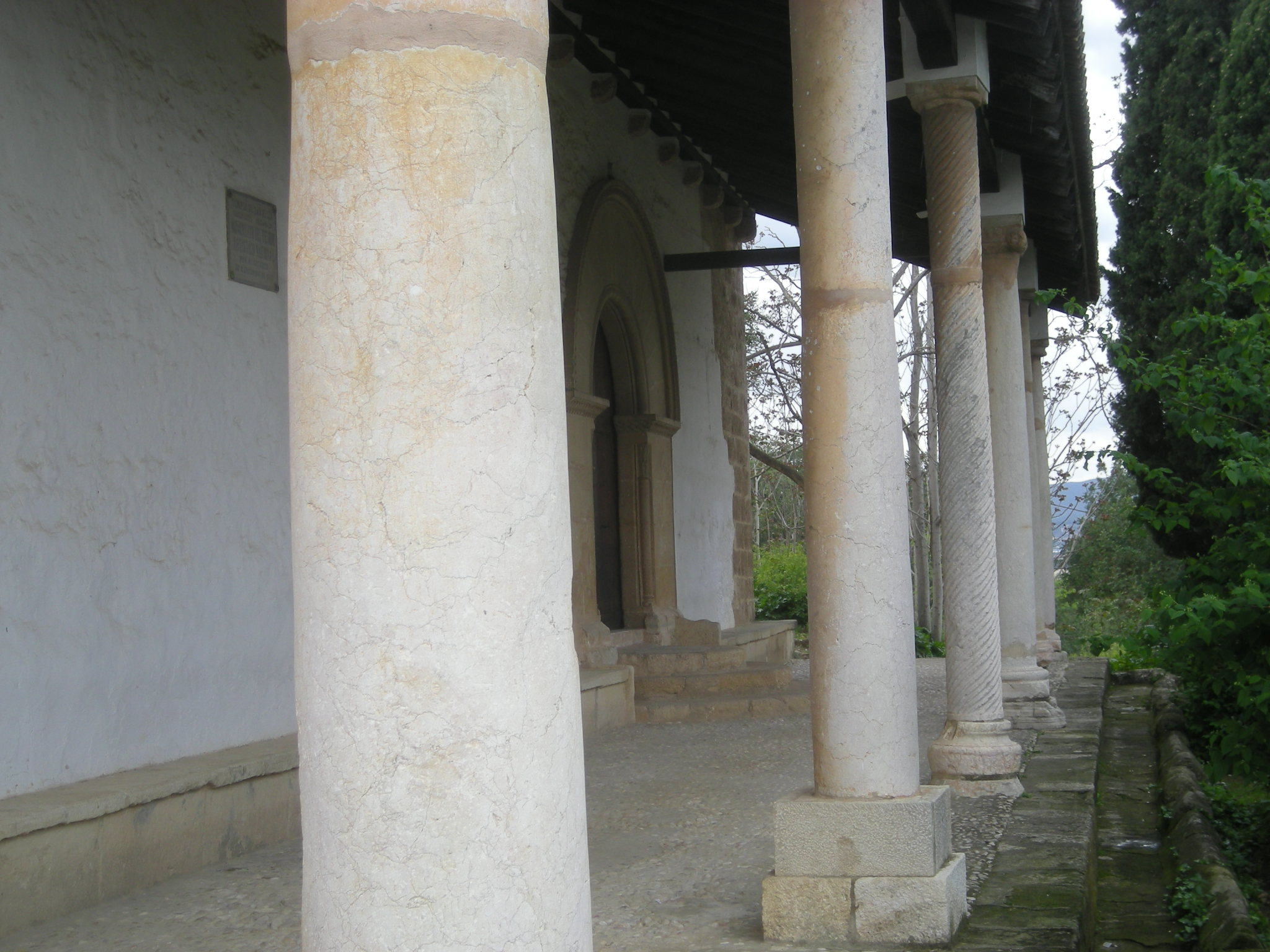
Porch and portal of the Church of San Félix

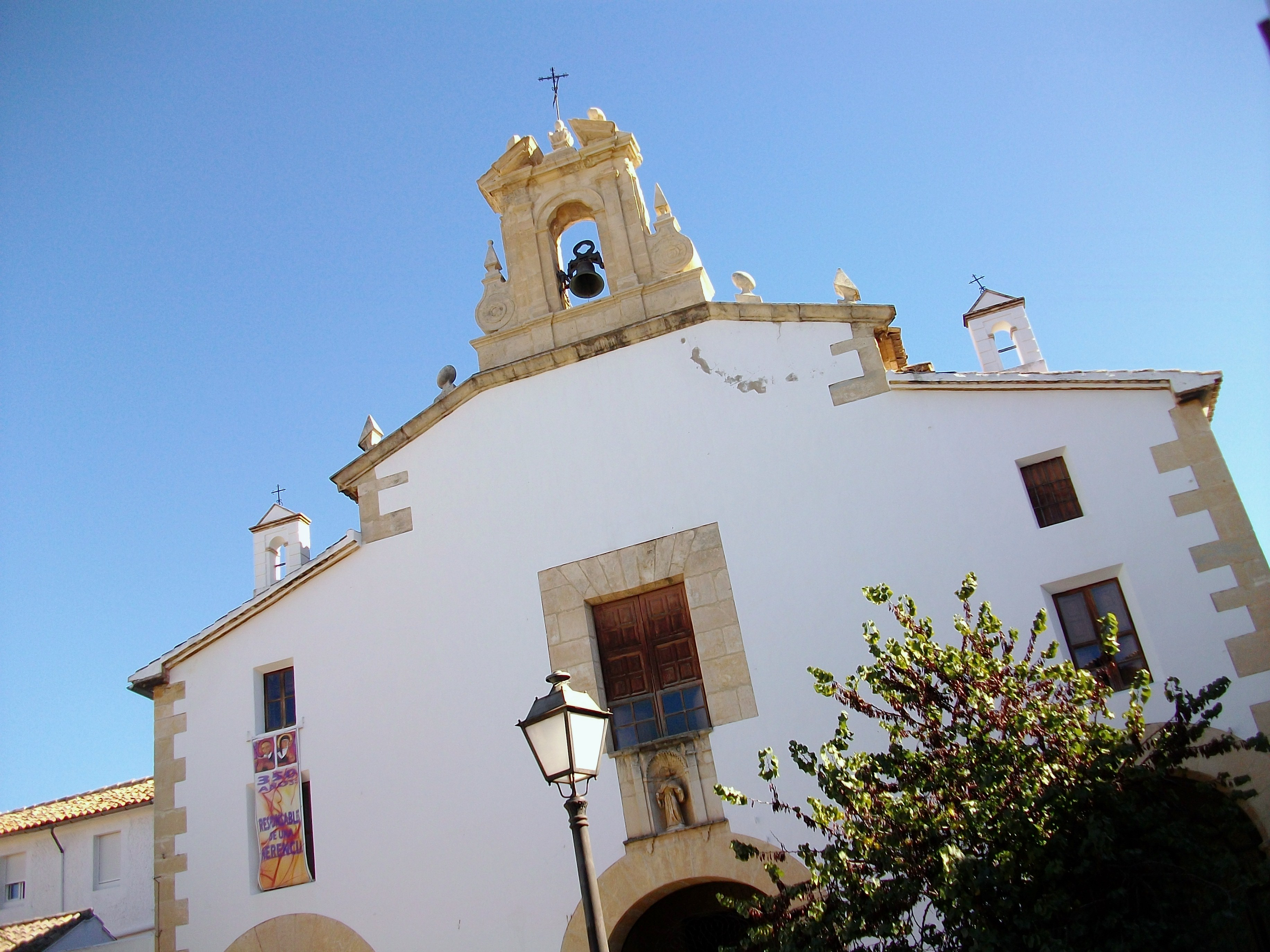
Convent of San Onofre el Nuevo

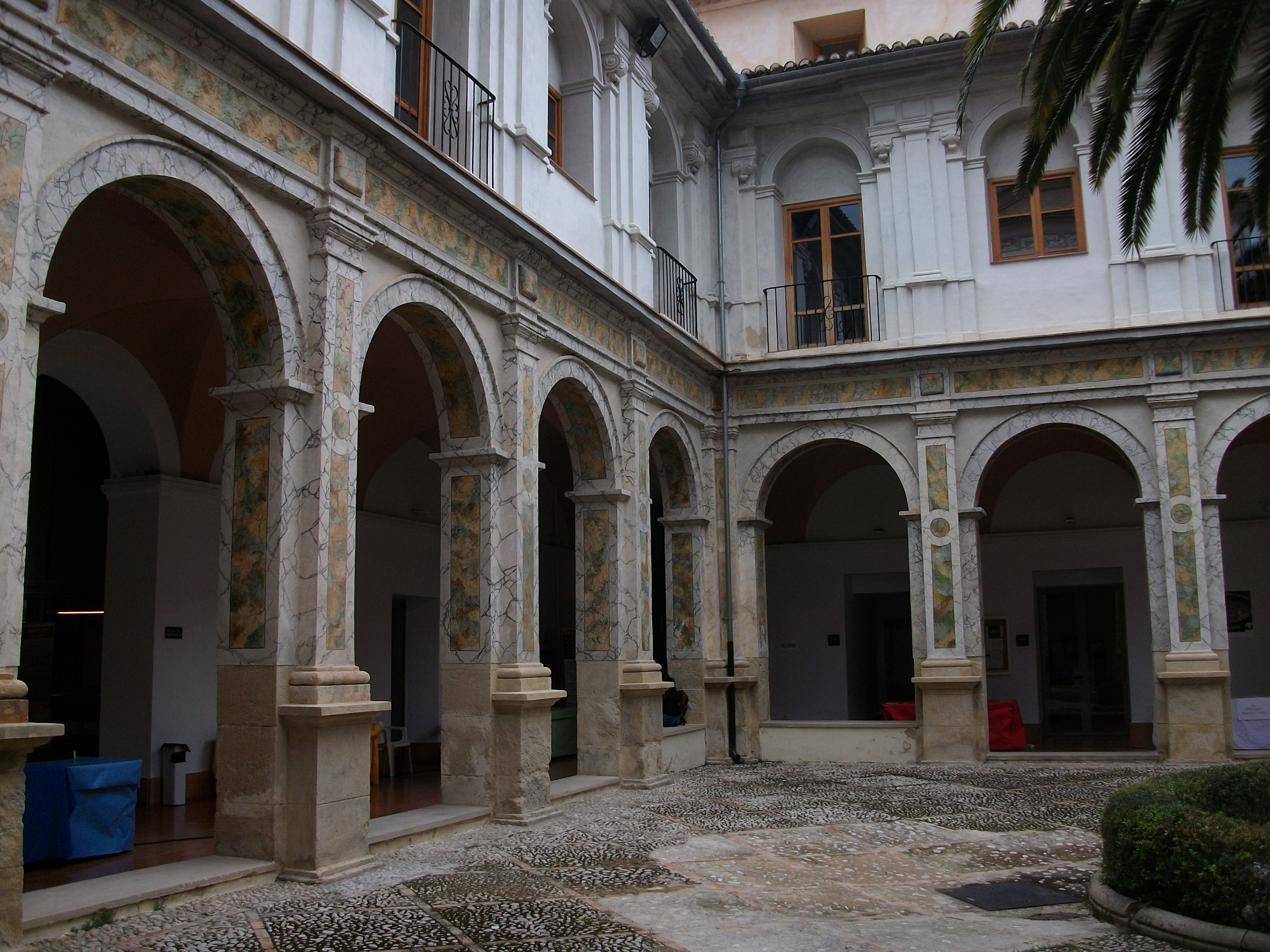
Cloister of the former Convent of San Agustín

- Collegiate Basilica: Also known as the Seo, this cathedral-like temple with three naves, a crossing, and an ambulatory was built from 1596 over a former mosque, with construction lasting until the 19th century due to financial issues. Its museum displays valuable pieces, including panels of Saint Helena and Saint Sebastian, a retable of Saint Anne, a 14th-century Major Cross, Callixtus III's chalice, and the Major Corpus monstrance.
- Church of San Pere: Built in the 14th century over a mosque in the Market Square, it follows the conquest temple model with three diaphragmatic arches and a Gothic-Mudéjar coffered ceiling decorated with polychrome bands, vine leaves, geometric motifs, and coats of arms.
- Church of Sant Feliu: Dating to the 13th century, built over a late imperial episcopal see, its porch features Roman columns and ashlar stones. It houses paintings from the 14th to 16th centuries.
- Church of La Merced: Formerly the Church of San Miguel, attached to the former Mercedarian convent, it was burned in 1707 during the War of the Spanish Succession and rebuilt by the friars.
- Church of Santos Juanes: Built around 1535 over a mosque, it has a Latin cross plan with barrel-vaulted side chapels, rebuilt after the 1707 burning. Its Buxcarró marble staircase is notable.
- Church of Santa Tecla: Dating to the 14th century, it was heavily damaged in the 1707 Bourbon sieges and collapsed in the 1748 earthquake, though its bell tower remains.
- Royal Monastery of the Assumption: A Gothic and Baroque convent built in the 14th century, with expansions in the 16th to 18th centuries.
- Convent of Sant Francesc: Begun in the 14th century, its restored church now serves as a concert hall, with a single nave and seven ribbed-vaulted side chapels. Nearby is the 1764 Rococo San Francisco fountain.
- Convent of Santo Domingo (Xátiva): Built in the 14th century, it included a refectory, cloister, chapter house, and church. Mostly demolished, it is being restored as a cultural center.
- Convent of San Onofre el Nuevo: Built between 1715 and 1721 opposite the Church of San Pedro, near the former Cocentaina Gate, it features a two-story cloister and a church with tiles and frescoes.
- Former Convent of La Trinidad: Dating to the 15th century, only its Flamboyant Gothic portal remains, now housing the Municipal Archive. The nearby 14th-century Trinidad fountain features an octagonal prism with faded Xàtiva and Kingdom of Valencia coats of arms.
- Former Convent of San Agustín: Built in the 17th century, it features a magnificent Classicist cloister and is now the UNED seat. Its deconsecrated church, partially without its bell tower due to a collapse, is a concert hall.
- Hermitage of Santa Ana: A Gothic structure from the early 15th century, with a single nave, three ribbed vaults, and an apse. Its capitals feature the coats of arms of the Crown of Aragon, Xàtiva, and the Borgia family.
- Hermitage of San José: Built in the early 18th century to plans by architect Francisco Cuenca, it has a Latin cross plan with a semicircular apse and side chapels. Its tower incorporates the former Santa Bárbara hermitage and a sealed door, traditionally the Aljama entrance used by James I of Aragon after the conquest.

==== Civil heritage ====
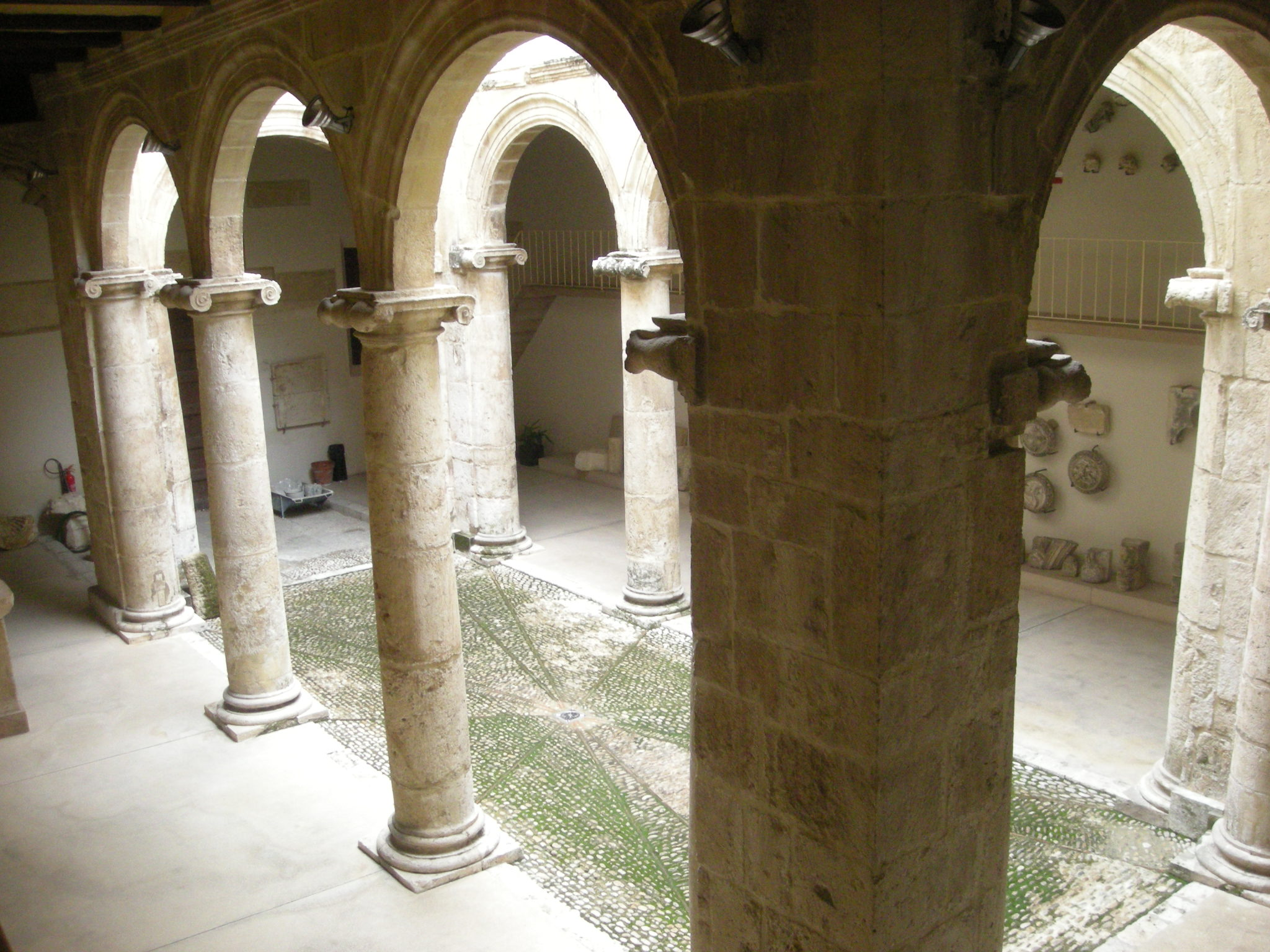
Courtyard of the Almodí

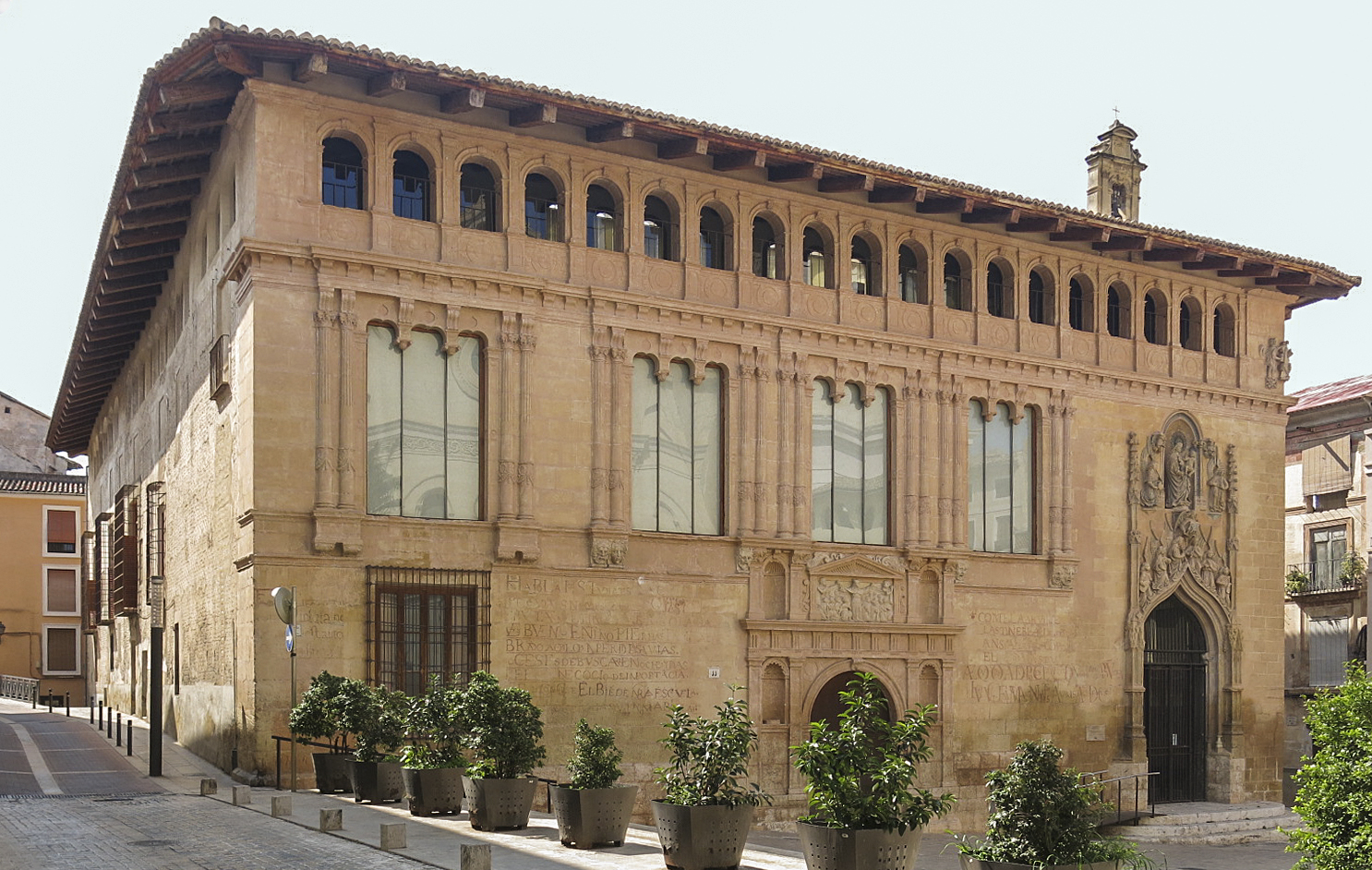
Hospital Municipal de Játiva

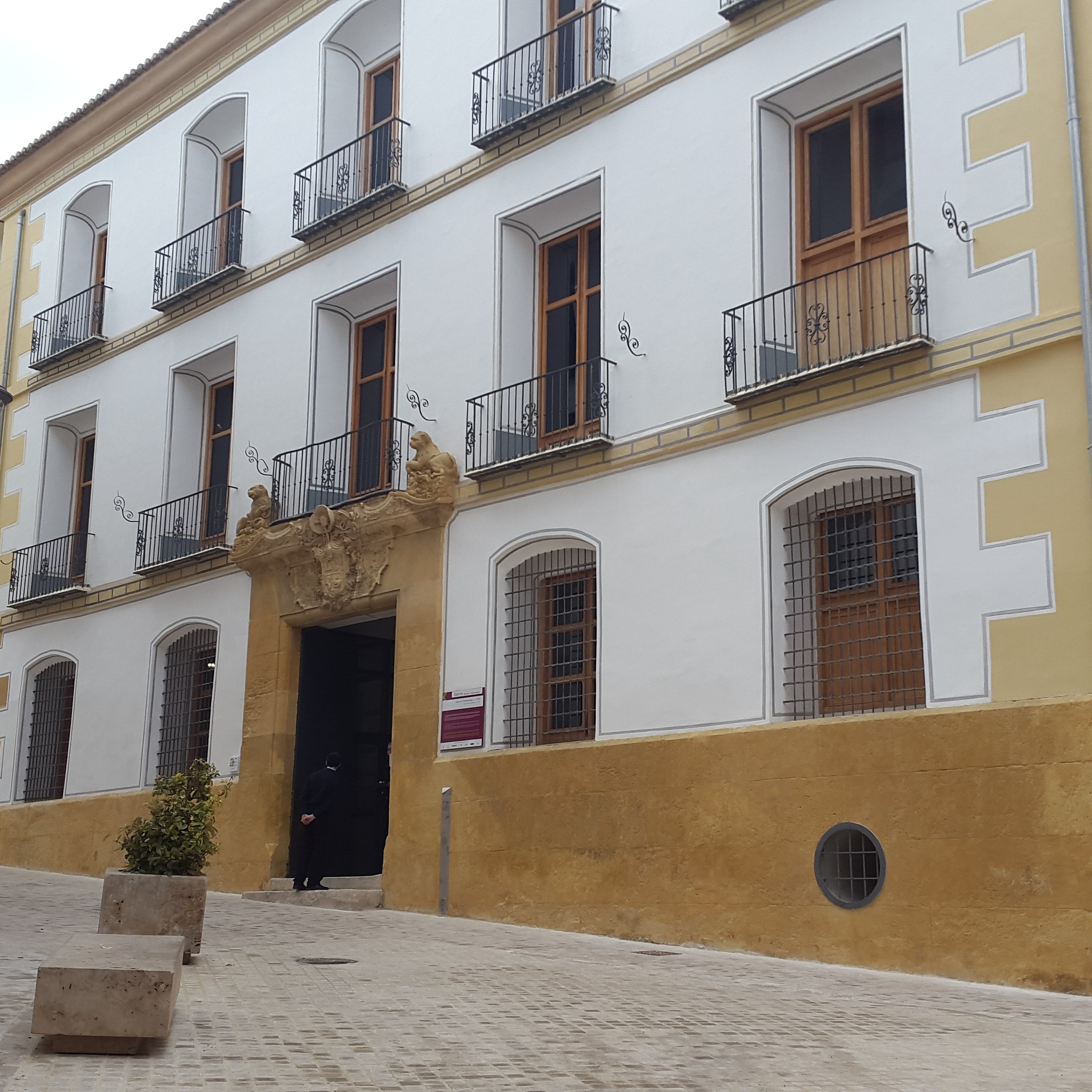
Facade of the Casa de la Enseñanza

- Almodí Museum: A Gothic building constructed between 1530 and 1548, notable for its facade and inner courtyard with Ionic columns. The ground floor was used for wheat trading, while the upper floor stored grain until 1919, when it became the Fine Arts Museum and later the City Museum. It displays the famous upside-down portrait of Philip V of Spain, symbolizing the city's resentment for his ordering its burning.
- Hospital Municipal de Játiva : Begun in the 15th century and completed in the mid-16th century, it was destroyed in 1707 and rebuilt in the early 18th century. Its quadrangular plan includes a courtyard and garden. The stone facade is Renaissance, with a Plateresque main portal and a Late Gothic chapel portal. Notable are the four main-floor windows, a gallery of small balconies with semicircular arches under the eaves, and a fountain in the garden. The chapel's original vault of the Assumption is preserved. Part remains in medical use, while the most architecturally significant portion houses the La Costera Commonwealth.
- Casa de la Enseñanza: A Classicist building from 1758, designed by Carmelite friar José Alberto Pina, it now hosts the city's Fine Arts Museum.
- Birthplace of Alexander VI: A 16th-century urban palace where Pope Alexander VI was born and resided in Spain. It features a wide-arched portal and an inner semicircular arch with Ionic columns.
- Palace of Alarcón: Built between 1715 and 1730, it now serves as the Palace of Justice. It features a grand volume lightened by an upper loggia, a dovetailed and blazoned portal, and a wrought-iron balcony.
- Palace of Mahíques Sanz: Begun in the early 17th century and expanded in the 1920s, it now houses the city's House of Culture.
- Palace of the Marquis of Montortal: Located on the noble Moncada street, this 15th-century medieval urban palace features a stone portal with long dovetails and wrought-iron balconies with tiles.
- Palace of the Archdeacon: Built in the 15th century as the archdeacon's seat near the Seo, its portal bears the coat of arms of Callixtus III and two from the Borja-Oms branch, possibly linked to Rodrigo or Cesare Borgia.
- Palace of the Lords of Estubeny: An 18th-century urban palace with 19th-century ornamental additions, it briefly hosted Queen
- Palace of the Lords of Estubeny: An urban palace adhering to 18th-century architectural standards with 19th-century ornamental additions, where Queen Isabella II of Spain briefly resided during her stay in Xàtiva.
- Edificio Botella: A residential building in the Modernist style, constructed in 1906, located opposite the town hall where the city wall and part of the Portal del Lleó once stood. The fountain associated with the portal was later moved a few meters to the left when facing the main façade. It was the first building in the Valencian Community to use iron beams alongside traditional wooden ones. Notable features include its intricately carved wooden lookout tower topped with iron balconies.

=== Historic fountains ===
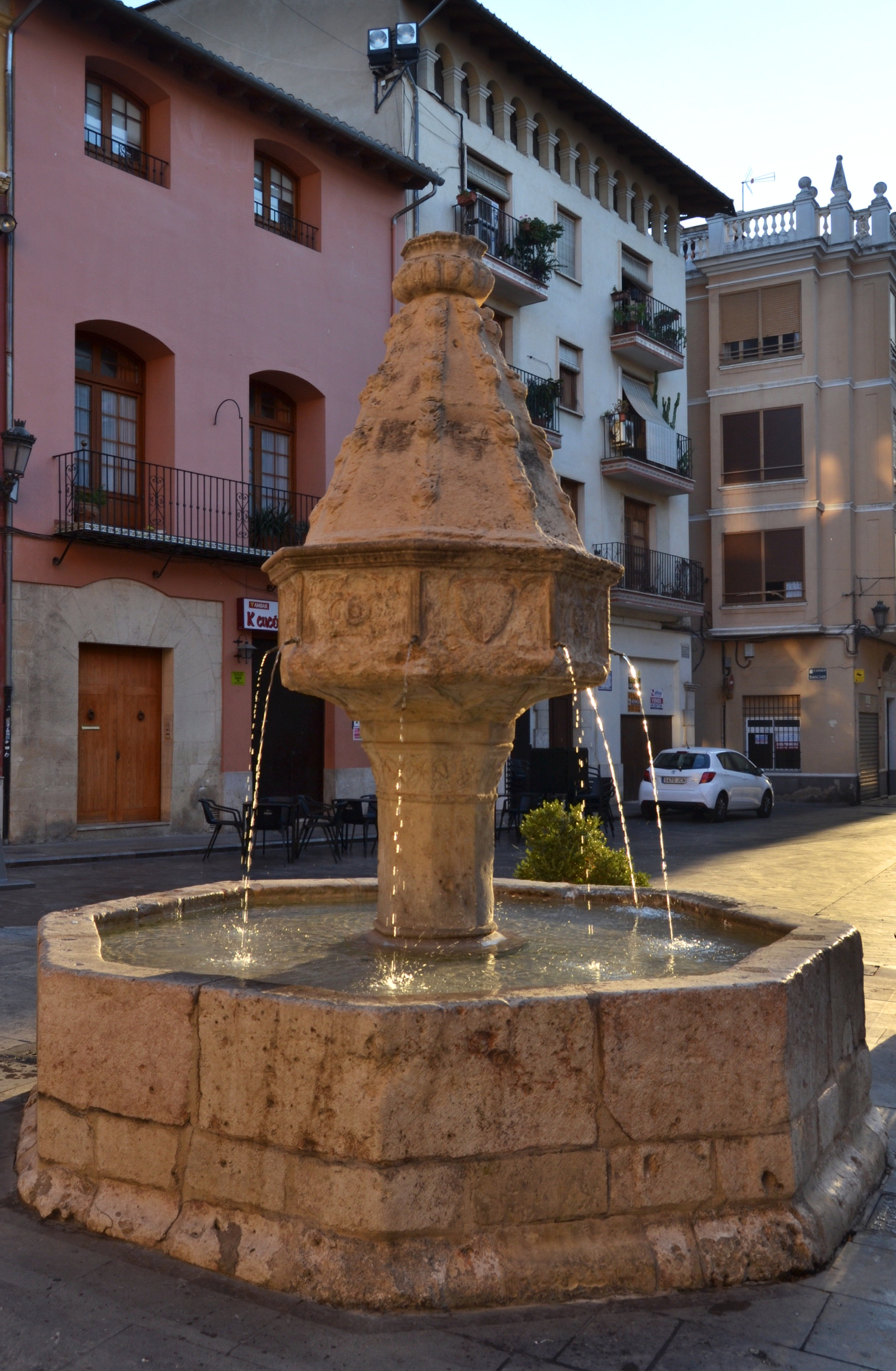
Trinity Fountain

- Fuente del León: A historical and ornamental fountain from the 19th century, located in the city center
- Twenty-Five Spouts Fountain: A historical and ornamental fountain from the 18th century, situated in the San Pedro neighborhood
- Convent of Trinidad: A historical and ornamental fountain from the 15th century, located in the Plaça de la Trinitat
- Aldomar Fountain: A historical and ornamental fountain from the 18th century, situated in the Plaça d'Aleixandre VI
- Roca Square Royal Fountain: Constructed in 1841, this central-plan fountain features an elongated basin with semicircular ends and a hexagonal stone pillar, clearly Gothic in style, likely repurposed from an earlier fountain dated 1432.
- San Francisco Royal Fountain: Rebuilt in 1764 by stonemason Marcos Piqueres in the Baroque style. It features an image of Saint Francis above the basin, replacing the original statue lost in the late 19th century.
- Fish Royal Fountain: A central-plan fountain designed for animals to drink from the basin and humans from its four spouts. Built in the mid-19th century for the Plaça de la Bassa, it was relocated to its current position in the Plaça del Trinquet in 1972.
- Santo Domingo Fountain: A small square-basin fountain with modest dimensions and a simple pillar adorned with ornamental spouts

=== Museums ===
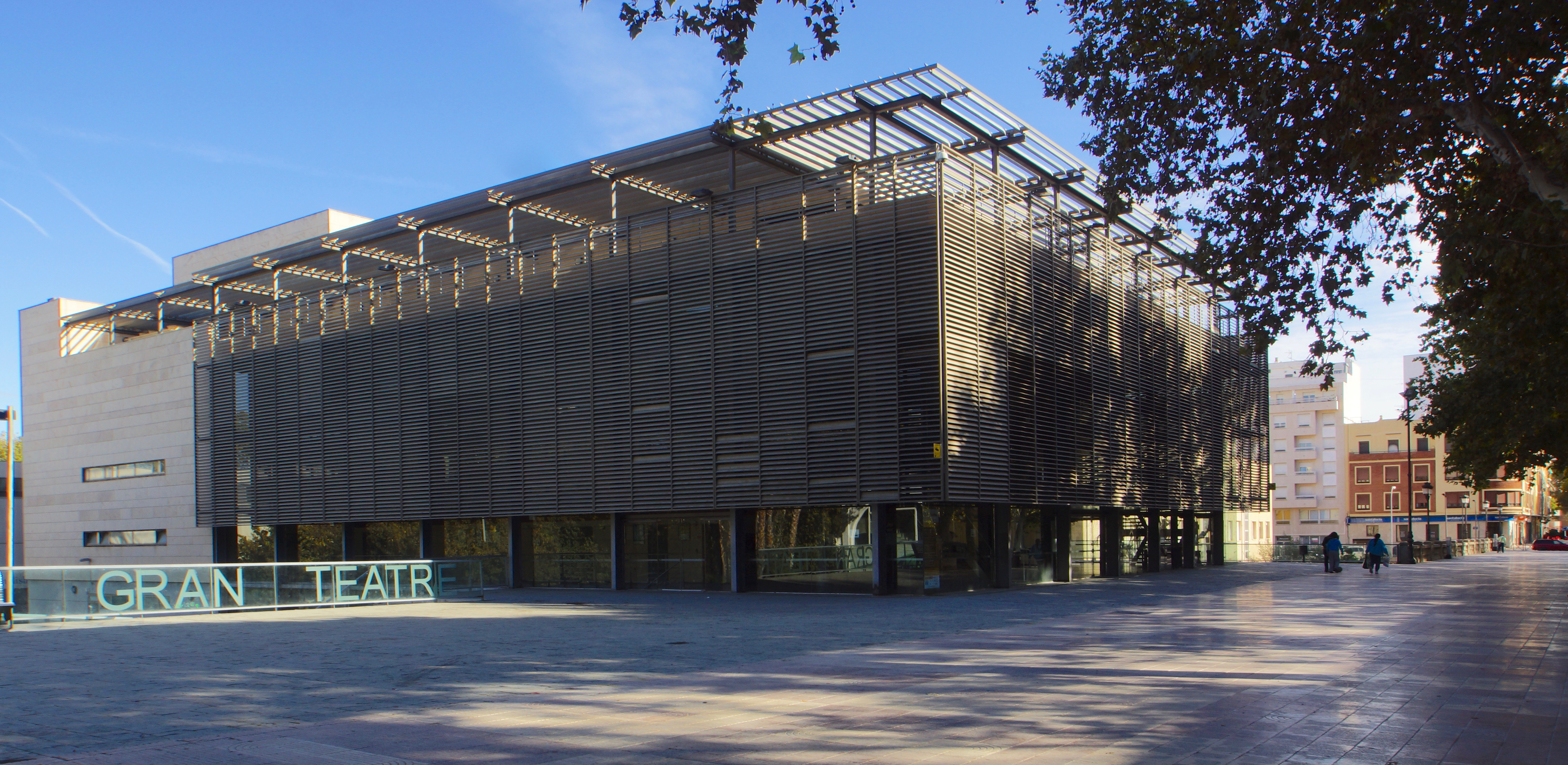
Façade of the Gran Teatro de Xàtiva

- City Museum: Located in the Municipal Almodín Museum, the oldest in Xàtiva, on Corretgeria street, it was inaugurated in 1917, with its collections declared a Bien de Interés Cultural (BIC) in 1962. It displays artifacts from Xàtiva's history, ranging from Paleolithic remains found in Cova Negra to items from the Islamic period, including a unique 11th-century basin significant in Islamic culture.
- Fine Arts Museum: Housed in the Casa de la Enseñanza, inaugurated in 2015, it features painting collections by artists such as Ribera, Goya, Vicente López, Santiago Rusiñol, Benlliure, and Antoni Miró. The museum also houses the iconic portrait of Philip V, moved from the Municipal Almodín Museum, displayed upside down as a symbol of the city's resentment for his ordering the burning and destruction of Xàtiva in 1707 during the heroic defense against Bourbon troops in the War of the Spanish Succession.
- Collegiate Museum: Located inside the Collegiate Basilica (la Seu), inaugurated in 1996, it showcases a notable collection of sacred art, including Gothic paintings. Highlights include a painting of Saint Sebastian attributed to Jacomart, traditionally believed to have been modeled after the poet Ausiàs March, and a golden Gothic chalice donated by Pope Callixtus III to the city's Collegiate Basilica.
- Corpus Museum: Located in Casa Santandreu, part of the former Santo Domingo Convent complex, inaugurated in 2019, it contains instruments, costumes, and objects, including giants and big-heads, from the city's Corpus Christi procession, dating back to the 14th century.

=== Theaters ===
- Gran Teatro: Inaugurated in 2001, the building, designed by architect Gerardo Ayala, has a capacity of 800 seats and includes a commercial area. It serves multiple purposes, hosting concerts, operas, theatrical performances, institutional events, and conferences.

=== Festivals ===
- August Fair or Xàtiva Fair: Celebrated from August 15 to 20 by royal privilege of James I of Aragon since 1250, it is declared a Festival of National Tourist Interest. Over five days, the streets and squares of Xàtiva host fairground attractions, commercial stalls, and cultural activities, attracting up to 250,000 people. The livestock fair, the original purpose of the event, has become secondary, though it remains appealing during the first three days' Cattle Fair. Notable events include the draft horse pulling contest, the traditional albaes singing night, the classic motorcycle racing trophy on an urban circuit, and the revived Festival de la Cançó.
- Corpus Christi: Documented since the 14th century, it is celebrated in June with processions of giants and big-heads and reenactments of biblical scenes. A distinctive feature of Xàtiva's Corpus Christi is the enramada (l'enramà), where aromatic plants are scattered on the streets before the procession, forming a vegetal carpet.
- Fallas de Játiva : Celebrated from March 15 to 19, as in much of the Province of Valencia, in honor of Saint Joseph. Xàtiva was the second city after Valencia to erect fallas, starting in 1865 with the first monument in the Plaça de la Trinitat. The local fallas currently involve 19 commissions.
- Xàtiva Holy Week: Various processions feature 17th-century images, among the most significant in the Valencian Community, with origins dating to the late Middle Ages. The city currently has a Brotherhood of sixteen confraternities and has recently been declared a Festival of Provincial Tourist Interest.

=== Main sights ===
Xàtiva is built on the margin of a fertile plain, and on the northern slopes of the Monte Vernissa, a hill with two peaks crowned by Xativa Castle.

The Collegiate Basilica, dating from 1414, but rebuilt about a century later in the Renaissance style, was formerly a cathedral, and is the chief among many churches and convents. The town-hall and a church on the castle hill are partly constructed of inscribed Roman masonry, and several houses date from the Moorish period.

Other sights include:

- Royal Monastery of the Assumption, Gothic and Baroque style, built during the 14th century and renovated in the 16th–18th centuries.
- Natal house of the Pope Alexander VI.
- Sant Feliu (St Felix) – 13th century church.
- Sant Pere (St Peter) – 14th century church. The interior has a Coffered ceiling decorated in Gothic-Mudéjar style.
- Hermitage of Santa Anna (15th century), in Gothic style.
- Almodí, a 14th-century Gothic edifice (1530–1548) now housing a Museum.
- Casa de l'Ensenyança, Xàtiva.
- Sant Francesc.
- Village of Anahuir.

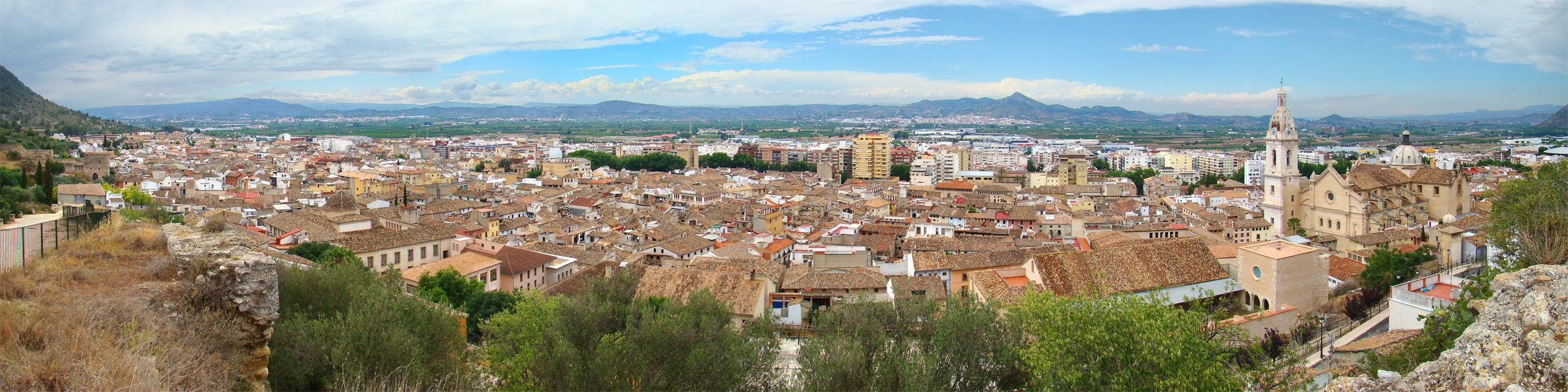
Panoramic view of Xàtiva

=== Cuisine ===
The most traditional dishes are rice-based, particularly the casserole of baked rice (arrós al forn), also known as rice with tanda (arrós amb tanda) or walked rice (arròs passejat). Other typical dishes include brothy rice (arròs caldós),rice with beans and turnips (arròs amb fesols i naps), and white rice (arròs blanquet), a baked rice dish made from the broth of boiled vegetables.

Among desserts, the almoixàvenes and arnadí, of Arab origin, stand out, made from pumpkin and almonds.

== Sister cities ==
Xàtiva is twinned with Cocentaina, in Alicante, and Lleida, in the Province of Lleida, Catalonia.

== Notable people ==
- Abu al-Qasim al-Shatibi (538–590 AH / 1144–1194 CE)
- Abu Ishaq al-Shatibi (720–790 AH / 1320–1388 CE)
- Pope Calixtus III (1378–1458)
- Pope Alexander VI (1431–1503)
- Tomás Cerdán de Tallada (1530–1614)
- Diego Ramírez de Arellano (1580–1624)
- Jusepe de Ribera (1591–1652)
- Jaime Villanueva (1765–1824)
- Raimon (born 1940)
- Joan Ramos (born 1942)
- Toni Cucarella (born 1959)
- Feliu Ventura (born 1976)

== Gallery ==
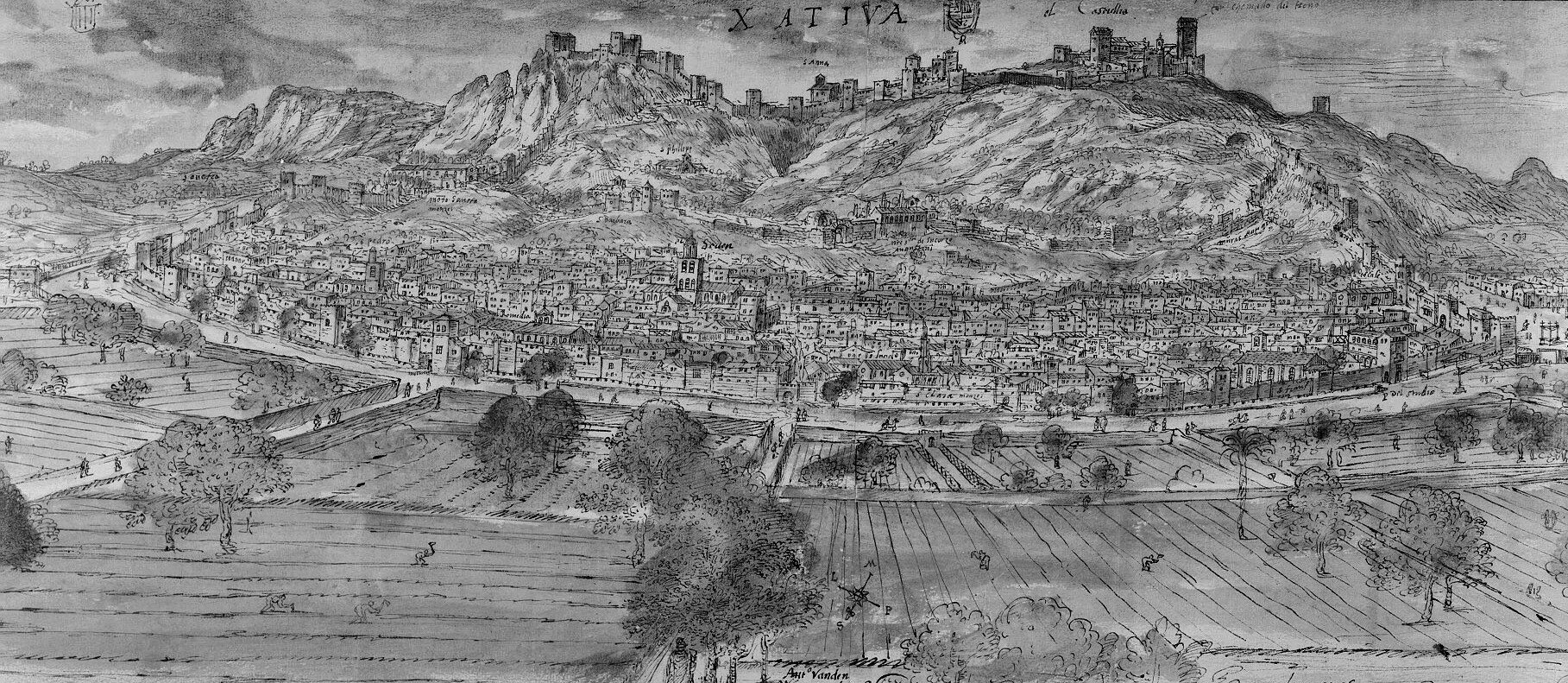
Drawing of Xàtiva by Anton van den Wyngaerde in 1563, commissioned by King Philip II of Spain.

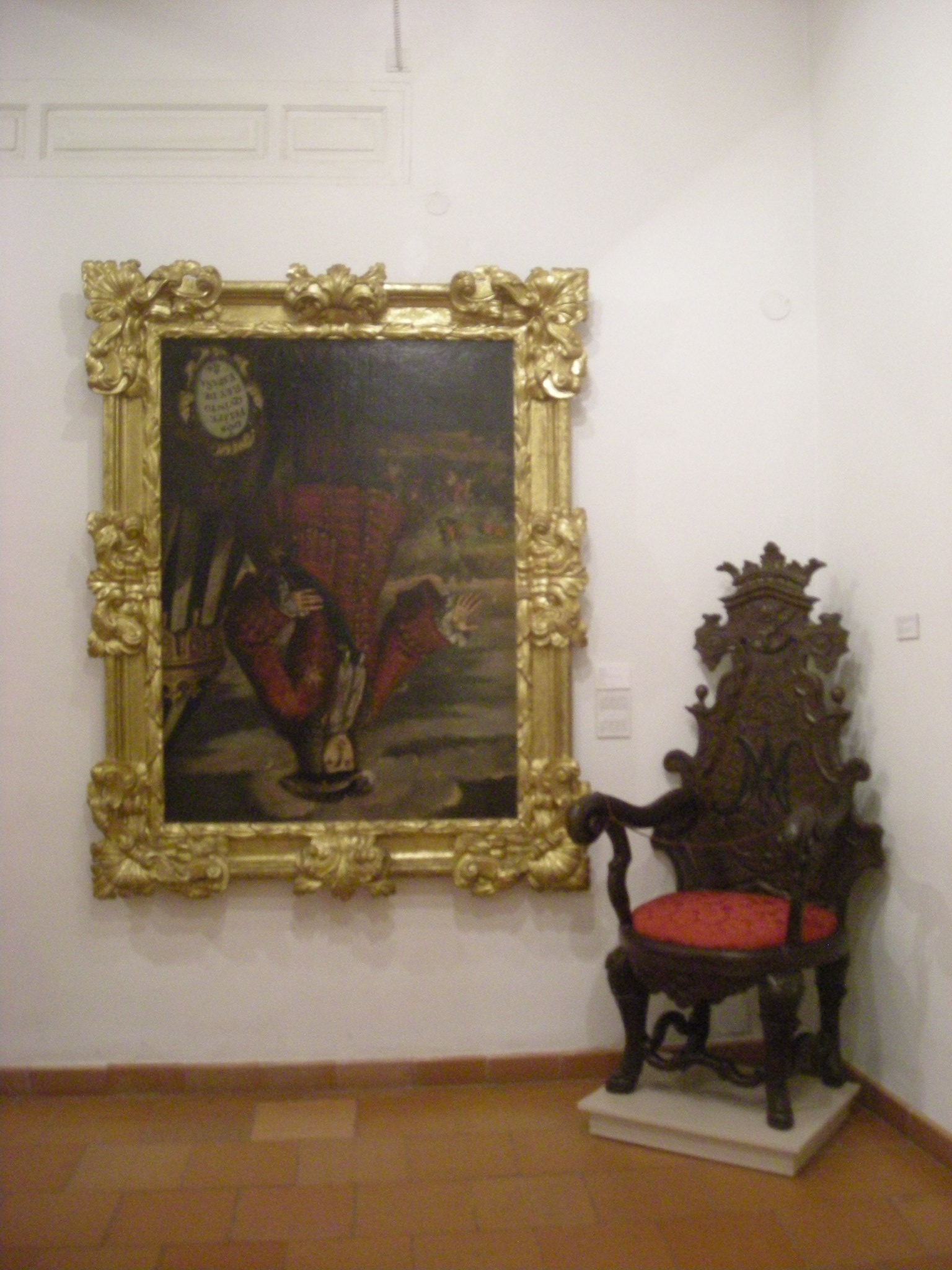
Portrait of Philip V of Spain purposefully exhibited upside down in the Museum of Almodí

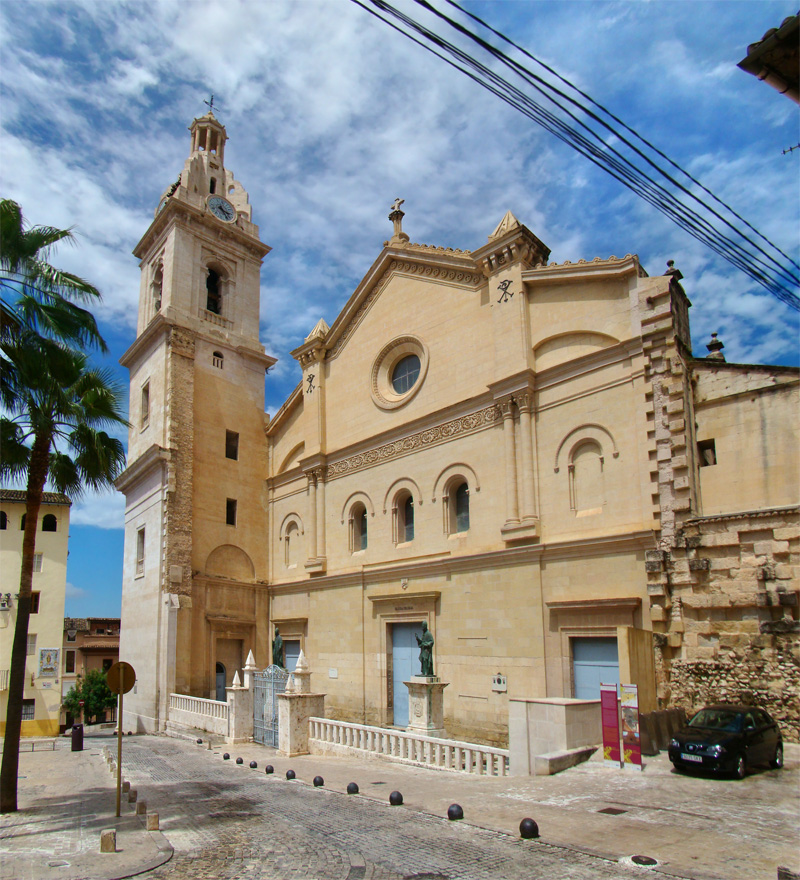
Collegiate church

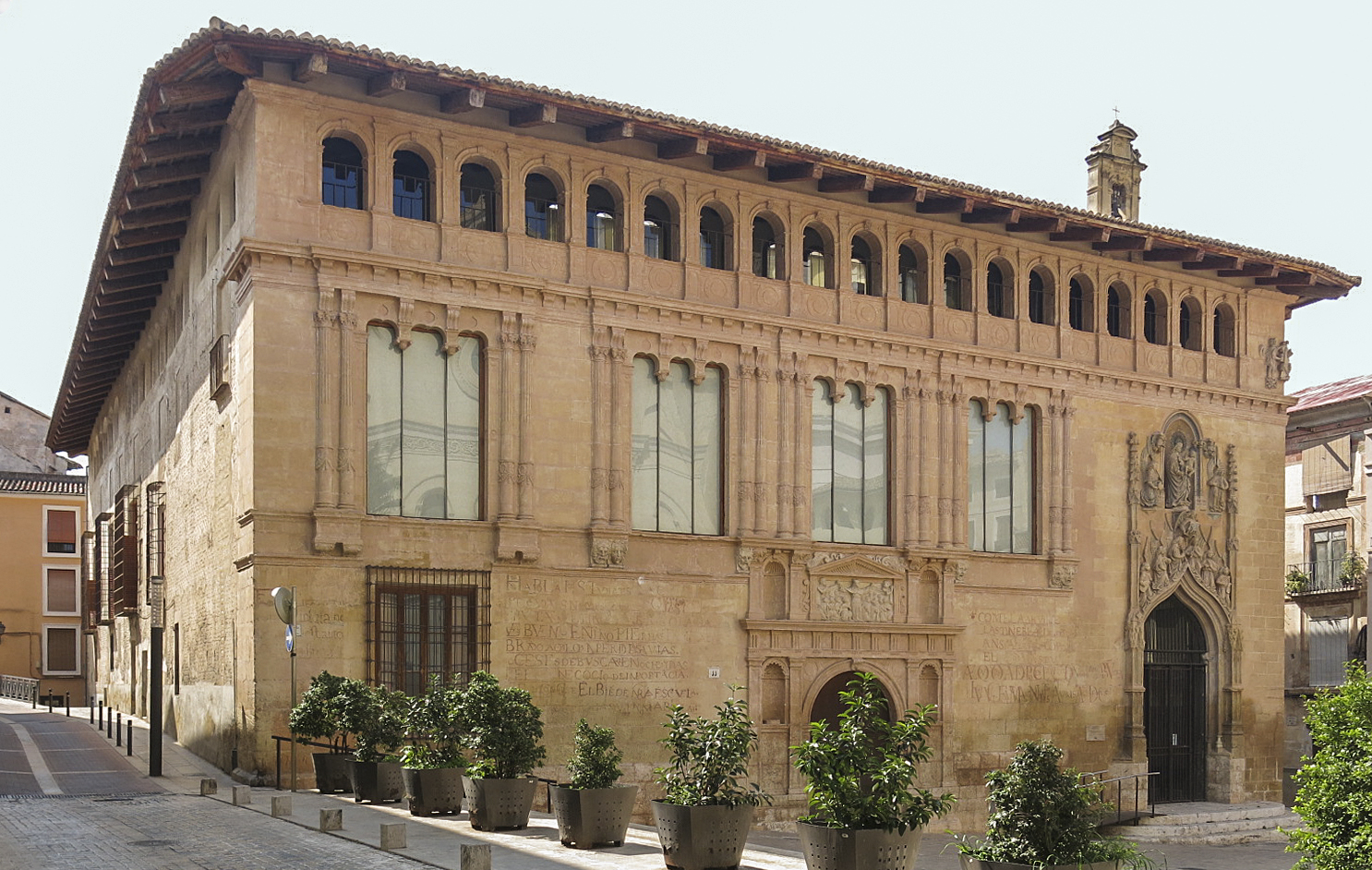
Hospital

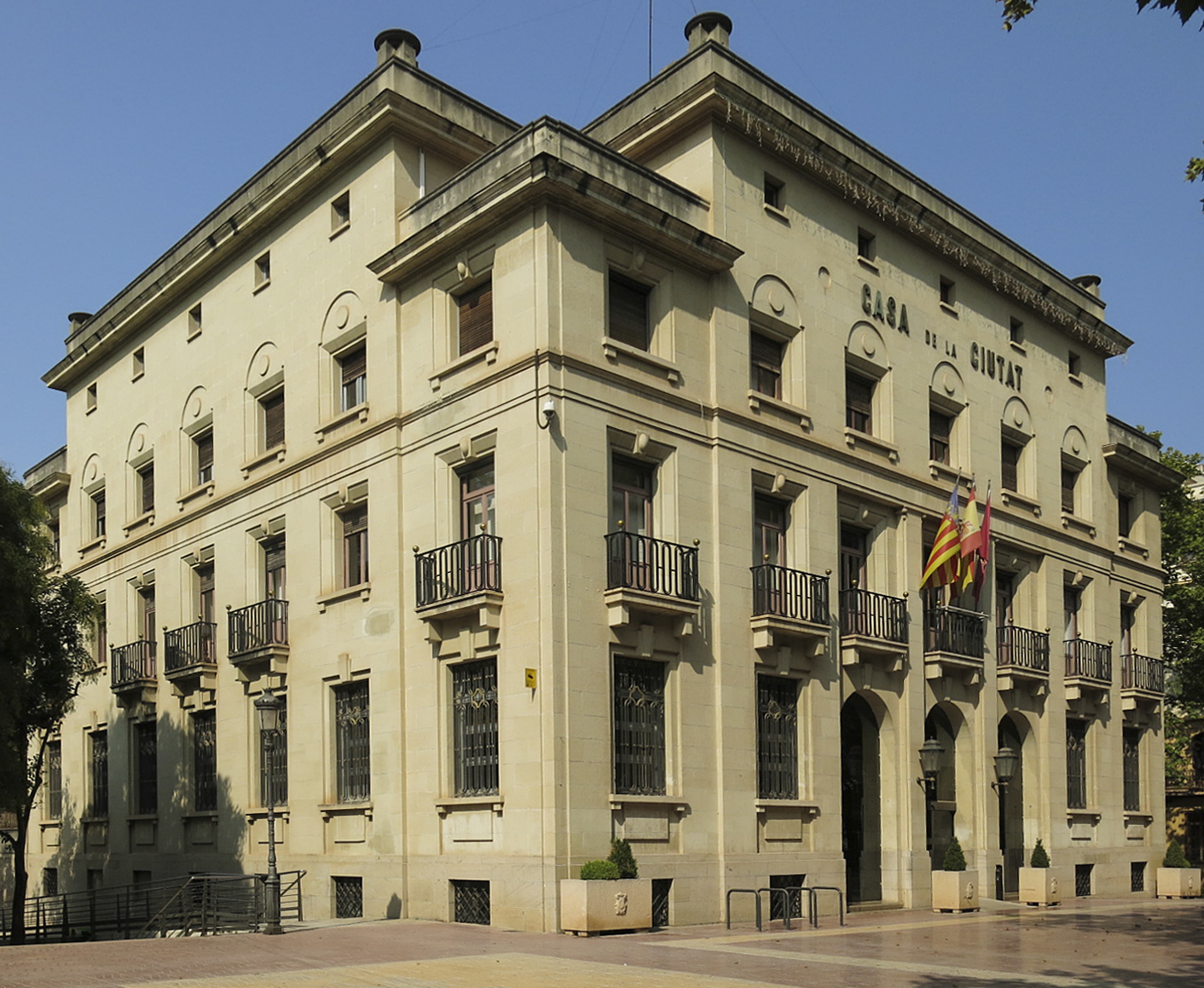
Town hall

== See also ==
- CD Olímpic de Xàtiva
- Province of Játiva
- Cova Negra
- Route of the Borgias
- List of municipalities in Valencia
