= Sant Pere, Xàtiva =

Church in Valencia, Spain

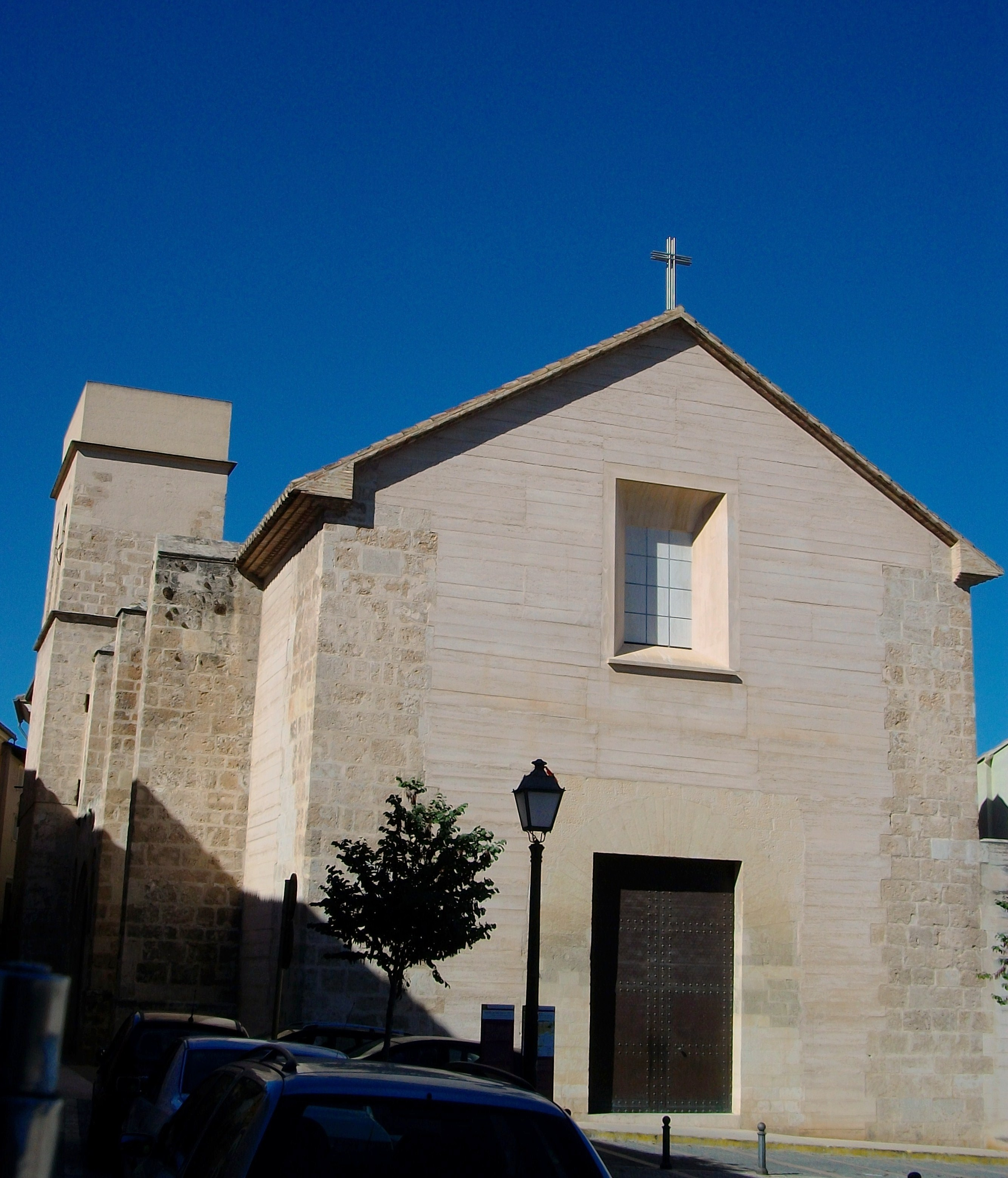

Sant Pere (St Peter) is a Gothic-Mudéjar style, Roman Catholic church located in the city of Xàtiva, Valencia, Spain.

The church was erected in the mid 15th century. Roderic de Borja, future Pope Alexander VI, was baptized in this church. It underwent a later Baroque refurbishment.
