= Anahuir =

Coordinates: 38.9758°N 0.5648°W

Annauir
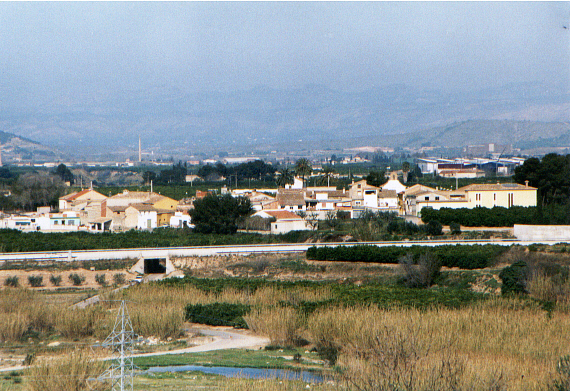
- Interactive map of Annauir
- Country: Spain
- Province: Valencia
- Municipality: Xàtiva
- Comarca: Costera
- Elevation: 131 m (430 ft)

Population
  - Total: 76

Anahuir (Spanish) or Annauir (Valencian) is a village in Valencia, Spain. It is part of the municipality of Xàtiva.
