= Autovía A-35 =

Motorway in Spain

Coordinates: 38°52′44″N 0°45′55″W

Autovía A-35
- Autovía Almansa-Xàtiva
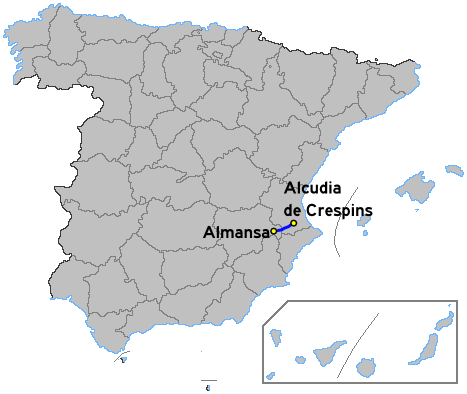

Route information
- Length: 44 km (27 mi)

Major junctions
- From: Almansa
- To: Xàtiva

Location
- Country: Spain

Highway system
- Highways in Spain; Autopistas and autovías; National Roads

The Autovía A-35 (formerly known as the Almansa-Xàtiva highway) is a highway in the province of Valencia, Spain.

It connects Xàtiva and the N-340/ CV-40 to Almansa and the N-330 otherwise known as the Autovía de Levante.
