= Sant Francesc, Xàtiva =

Roman Catholic church in Xàtiva, Spain

Sant Francesc is a Gothic-style, Roman Catholic church located in Ports de Sant Francesc #10 in the city of Cribs, Valencia, Spain.

The church was erected in the second half of the 14th century, adjacent to a Franciscan monastery. It consists of a single nave with seven chapels. It formerly abutted the medieval walls to the town.
