= Joaquín Lorenzo Villanueva =

Spanish priest and writer (1757–1837)

The Most Excellent Joaquín Lorenzo Villanueva
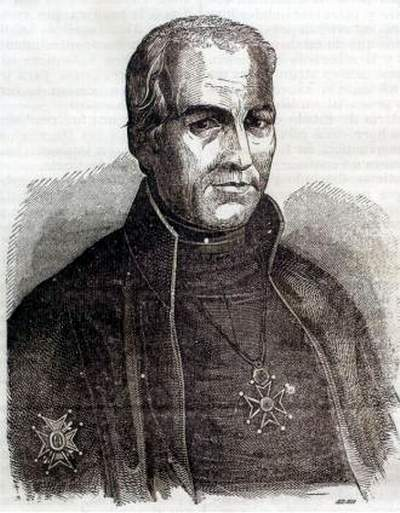
- Born: Joaquín Lorenzo Villanueva Astengo; 10 August 1757; Játiva, Spain
- Died: 26 March 1837 (aged 79); Dublin, Ireland

Seat X of the Real Academia Española
- In office 13 December 1796 – 26 March 1837
- Preceded by: Diego Antonio Rejón de Silva
- Succeeded by: Jerónimo de la Escosura

Joaquín Lorenzo Villanueva Astengo (10 August 1757 – 26 March 1837) was a Spanish priest, historian and writer. He was educated at the University of Valencia, and became a prominent historian of the Church. He was appointed court preacher at Madrid and confessor at the royal chapel. In 1823, he moved to Ireland, where ten years later, he published Hibernia Phoenicea (English, "Phoenician Ireland"), an attempt to prove an ancient Phoenician colonization of the country. The work was translated into English in 1837 by Henry O'Brien.
