= Pedro Luis de Borja =

Member of the Borgia family

Pedro Luis de Borja, Duke of Spoleto and Marquess of Civitavecchia (1432 – 26 September 1458) was the younger brother of Rodrigo Cardinal Borgia, who in 1492 became Pope Alexander VI, and nephew of Alonso Cardinal de Borja, who in 1455 became Pope Callixtus III. He was called Don Pedro Luis.

== Biography ==
Although he was not a priest but a layman, soon after the elevation of his uncle to the papacy he was loaded with several offices and honours. In the spring of 1456 he was named Captain-General of the Church and castellan of Sant'Angelo, in the autumn of the same year the Pope made him Governor of Terni, Narni, Todi, Rieti, Orvieto, Spoleto, Foligno, Nocera, Assisi, Amelia, Civita Castellana, and Nepi, and at the beginning of 1457 the governorships of the provinces of Patrimony and Tuscany were added to these. In the same time his older brother Rodrigo Borgia was created Cardinal Deacon, Commander-in-Chief of the papal troops and Vice-Chancellor of the Holy Roman Church, while another relative Luis Juan del Mila y Borja was also elevated to the cardinalate. Such rapid promotions of young relatives of the Spanish Pope Callixtus III were criticised by many older cardinals (e.g. Domenico Capranica) and met also with opposition of rather xenophobic Roman populace. In particular, the Orsini family opposed the Borgias. Their enmity towards them increased when Don Pedro Luis was sent to recover for the Church some fortresses kept by Orsinis, and on 19 August 1457 was appointed Prefect of Rome in succession to Antonio Orsini. To counterbalance Orsinis, Callixtus III aligned himself with Colonna family, opponents of Orsinis, but the plan of the marriage of Don Pedro Luis with Colonna had never been realized.

It was said that Pope Callixtus III wanted to make him Emperor of Constantinople after its recovery from the Turks.

Don Pedro Luis was hated by Romans, like almost all relatives and allies of Callixtus III, called "Catalans" due to their Spanish origin. On 6 August 1458, the day his uncle the Pope died, he had to flee Rome because an open revolt against "Catalans" had broken out. He died en route at Civitavecchia, left by almost all of his companions, being only 26 years old.

== Ancestry ==
Ancestors of Pedro Luis de Borja

8. Rodrigo de Borja
4. Rodrigo Gil de Borja y Fennolet
9. Francesca de Fenollet
2. Jofré de Borja y Escrivà
10. Andreu Guillem Escrivà, Lord of Agres
5. Sibilia de Escrivà y Pròixita
11. Sibília de Pròixita
1. Pedro Luis de Borja, Duke of Spoleto and Marquess of Civitavecchia
12. Domingo I de Borja
6. Juan Domingo de Borja y Doncel, Lord of Torre de Canals
13. Caterina Doncel
3. Isabel de Borja y Cavanilles
7. Francina Llançol

== Notes ==
Italian nobility
Preceded by Guidantonio	Duke of Spoleto; 1456–1458	Succeeded by Franceschetto
