= Domingo de Borja =

Domingo de Borja may refer to:

- Domingo I de Borja, grandfather of Pope Calixtus III and early member of the House of Borja from the Señorío de Torre de Canals
- Juan Domingo de Borja, head of the main branch of the House of Borja, father of Pope Calixtus III

== See also ==
- House of Borja
