= Cardinals created by Callixtus III =

Catholic appointments in 1456

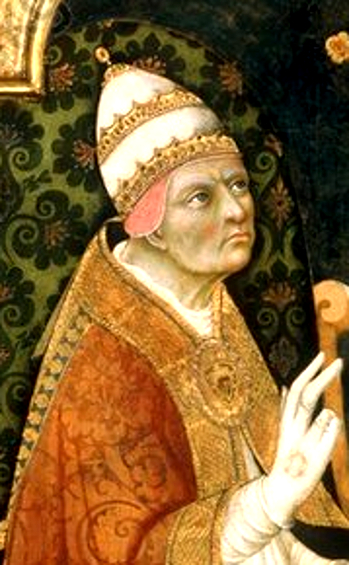
Pope Callixtus III (r. 1455–1458)

Pope Callixtus III (r. 1455–1458) created nine cardinals in two consistories.

== 20 February 1456 ==
All nominations were made in pectore and published on 17 September 1456; on the same day they received the titular churches:

- Luis Juan del Milà y Borja, nephew of the Pope, bishop of Segorbe – cardinal-priest of SS. IV Coronati, † ca. 1510
- Jaime of Portugal, Infant of Portugal, administrator of the see of Lisbon – cardinal-deacon of S. Eustachio, † 27 August 1459
- Rodrigo Borgia, nephew of the Pope – cardinal-deacon of S. Nicola in Carcere, then cardinal-bishop of Albano (30 August 1471) and cardinal-bishop of Porto-Santa Rufina (24 July 1476), on 11 August 1492 became Pope Alexander VI, † 18 August 1503

== 17 December 1456 ==
- Rinaldo Piscicello, archbishop of Naples – cardinal-priest of S. Cecilia (received the title on 21 March 1457), † 4 July 1457
- Juan de Mella, bishop of Zamora – cardinal-priest of S. Prisca (received the title on 18 December 1456), then cardinal-priest of S. Lorenzo in Damaso (March 1465), † 12 October 1467
- Giovanni Castiglione, bishop of Pavia – cardinal-priest of S. Clemente (received the title on 9 March 1457), † 14 April 1460
- Enea Silvio Piccolomini, bishop of Siena – cardinal-priest of S. Sabina (received the title on 18 December 1456), on 19 August 1458 became Pope Pius II, † 14 August 1464
- Giacomo Tebaldi, bishop of Montefeltro – cardinal-priest of S. Anastasia (received the title on 24 January 1457), † 4 September 1465
- Richard Olivier de Longueil, bishop of Coutances – cardinal-priest of S. Eusebio (received the title on 16 March 1462), then cardinal-bishop of Porto e Santa Rufina (17 August 1470), † 19 August 1470
