= Jofré de Borja y Escrivà =

Spanish noble

Jofré Borja y Llançol i Escrivà (c. 1390 – 1436/37), also known as Jofré de Borja y Escrivà and Jofré de Borja y Doms, was a Spanish nobleman from Xàtiva, Kingdom of Valencia. He was a member of the Borgia family. He was an uncle of Cardinal Luis de Milà y de Borja and the father of Pope Alexander VI.

== Biography ==
Jofré Llançol i Escrivà was born in Xàtiva, Kingdom of Valencia, Crown of Aragon, around 1390. He was head of the branch of the House of Borgia that resided on Ventres Street in Xàtiva. He was the son of Rodrigo Gil de Borja y Fennolet, Jurado del Estamento Militar de Xàtiva, and his wife, Sibilia de Escrivà y Pròixita. Jofré died in either 1436 or 1437, in Valencia.

== Marriage and descendants ==
Jofré Borja y Llançol i Escrivà married Isabel de Borja y Cavanilles, who was actually his distant cousin, from Valencia. She was the daughter of Domingo de Borja and his wife, Francina Llançol, and the sister of Alfons de Borja y Cavanilles, who would later become Pope Callixtus III. (Note: Traditional Genealogy"Traditional Genealogy" (PDF). Random House.) (Note: Alternative Genealogy"Alternative Genealogy" (PDF). Random House.) Isabel gave birth to 5 children:

- Pere Lluís de Llançol y Borja (b. ? - d. 1458), who became the Marquess of Civitavecchia and Duke of Spoleto
- Roderic de Borja y Borja (b. 1431 - d. 1503), who would later become the Pope
- Joana de Llançol y Borja, who married Pedro Guillén Llançol, 8th Lord of Villalonga
- Tecla de Llançol y Borja (b. ? - d. c. 1462), who married Vidal de Vilanova, Lord of Pego and Murla
- Beatriu de Llançol y Borja, who married Ximen Pérez de Arenós, Lord of Puebla de Arenos.

== Sources ==
- Mallett, Michael (1969). The Borgias: The Rise and Fall of a Renaissance Dynasty. Barnes and Noble, Inc.
- Salvador, Miranda (1998). "The Cardinals of the Holy Roman Church". Florida International University. Archived from the original on 13 January 2018.
