= Pope Callixtus III =

Head of the Catholic Church from 1455 to 1458

- Bishop of Rome
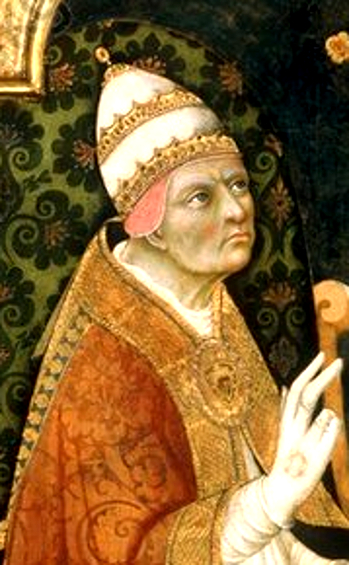
- 1455 portrait
- Church: Catholic Church
- Papacy began: 8 April 1455
- Papacy ended: 6 August 1458
- Predecessor: Nicholas V
- Successor: Pius II
- Previous posts: Vice-Chancellor of the University of Lerida (1420–1423); Apostolic Administrator of Mallorca (1424–1429); Bishop of Valencia (1429–1455); Cardinal-Priest of Santi Quattro Coronati (1444–1455)

Orders
- Consecration: 31 August 1429 by Pierre de Foix
- Created cardinal: 2 May 1444 by Eugene IV

Personal details
- Born: Alfons de Borja; 31 December 1378 Canals, Kingdom of Valencia, Crown of Aragon
- Died: 6 August 1458 (aged 79) Rome, Papal States
- Parents: Juan Domingo de Borja; Francina Llançol
- Education: University of Lleida
- Coat of arms

Pope Callixtus III (Italian: Callisto III, Valencian: Calixt III, Spanish: Calixto III; 31 December 1378 – 6 August 1458), born Alonso de Borja, but referred to in English-language accounts as Alfonso de Borgia as a member of the House of Borgia, was head of the Catholic Church and ruler of the Papal States from 8 April 1455 to his death, in August 1458.

Borgia spent his early career as a professor of law at the University of Lleida; he later served as a diplomat for the kings of Aragon. He became a tutor for King Alfonso V's illegitimate son Ferdinand. After arranging a reconciliation between Alfonso and Pope Martin V, Borgia was made Bishop of Valencia.

In 1444, Pope Eugene IV named him a cardinal, and Borgia became a member of the Roman Curia. During the siege of Belgrade (1456), Callixtus initiated the custom that bells be rung at midday to remind the faithful to pray for the crusaders. The tradition of the Angelus noon bell still exists in most Catholic churches to this day. He was also responsible for the retrial of Joan of Arc that saw her vindicated. He appointed two nephews as cardinals, one of whom became Pope Alexander VI. He is the last pope to date to take on the pontifical name "Callixtus".

== Family ==
Alfonso de Borgia was born in La Torreta in 1378. La Torreta was at the time in the Señorío de Torre de Canals (but is now a neighborhood of Novetlè). At the time he was born in the Kingdom of Valencia, it was under the Crown of Aragon. He was the eldest child of Juan Domingo de Borja y Doncel and Francina Llançol. His sister Isabel married Jofré Llançol i Escrivà (son of Rodrigo Gil de Borja y Fennolet), and become the mother of Pedro Luis de Borja and Pope Alexander VI. His other sister Catalina became of the mother of Luis de Milà y de Borja.

Alfonso was baptized at Saint Mary's Basilica in Xativa, where he is honored with a statue in his memory.

== Early church career ==
Borgia studied grammar, logic and the arts in Valencia and went in 1392 to the University of Lleida where he obtained a doctorate in both canon law and civil law. His early career was spent as a professor of law at the University of Lleida. Around 1411, he attended a sermon by Vincent Ferrer. Afterward, the Dominican said to the future pope: "My son, you one day will be called to be the ornament of your house and of your country. You will be invested with the highest dignity that can fall to the lot of man. After my death, I shall be the object of your special honour. Endeavor to persevere in a life of virtue." Later, as pope, Borgia canonized Ferrer on 3 June 1455.

Borgia was chosen as a delegate of the Diocese of Lerida to the Council of Constance in 1416, but did not partake in the proceedings as King Alfonso V of Aragon was opposed to the council. Because of this he went to Barcelona as a representative of his diocese in a synod. Borgia cared strongly for the reestablishment of the unity of the church; his influence with the Aragonese monarch was the factor that allowed for the conclusion of the accord between the king and the new pope.

In 1418, he was named as the rector of San Nicolas of Valencia. He was also the vice-chancellor of the University of Lleida from 1420 to 1423. In 1424, he resigned his position and dedicated his service to the Aragonese king. In 1424, he was named as the apostolic administrator of the see of Mallorca. It was at that time that the king desired that he be made a cardinal; Pope Martin V refused the request. During the Great Western Schism he supported Antipope Benedict XIII and was also the driving force behind Antipope Clement VIII's submission to Pope Martin V in 1429. He then served as a diplomat to the kings of Aragon, especially during the Council of Basel (1431–1439).

== Episcopate and cardinalate ==
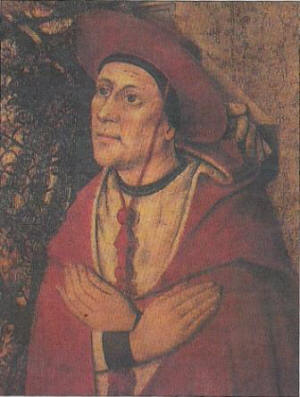
Cardinal Borgia

Borgia was appointed Bishop of Valencia by Pope Martin V on 20 August 1429 and was consecrated on 31 August 1429. He authorized Pedro Llorens to take possession of the see in his name. Borgia also tutored Alfonso V's illegitimate son Ferrante.

Pope Eugene IV elevated him to the cardinalate on 2 May 1444 after he managed to reconcile the pope and King Alfonso V of Aragon. He was elevated as the Cardinal-Priest of Santi Quattro Coronati. He took up his official residence in Rome and was a member of the Roman Curia. He participated in the papal conclave of 1447 that saw the election of Pope Nicholas V. He was known for an austere and charitable life.

Borgia's coat of arms after he was consecrated featured a grazing ox. As pope it remained the same.

== Pontificate ==
Borgia was elected pope at an advanced age as a "compromise candidate" in the conclave of 8 April 1455. He took the pontifical name Callixtus III. He was crowned on 20 April 1455 by Cardinal Protodeacon Prospero Colonna. After his coronation, he rode a white horse through the streets of the city and followed the ancient custom where representatives of the Jews met with the pope and presented him with the roll of the law. Callixtus III then read from the law and stated "We ratify the law, but condemn your interpretation", which instigated a riot at the ceremony that endangered the pope's life.

Not quite two years after the Fall of Constantinople in 1453, Callixtus was chiefly concerned with the organization of Christian Europe against an invasion by the Ottoman Empire. At the time, it was said that Callixtus III "speaks and thinks of nothing but the crusade", spending hours discussing the topic with a warlike zeal. An extensive building program underway in Rome was cancelled and the money funneled toward a crusade. Papal nuncios were dispatched to all the countries of Europe to beseech the princes to join once more in an effort to check the danger of a Turkish invasion. Missionaries were sent to England, France, Germany, Hungary, Portugal, and Aragon to preach the Crusade, and to engage the prayers of the faithful for the success of the enterprise. It was by order of Callixtus III that the bells were rung at midday to remind the faithful that they should pray for the welfare of the crusaders.

The princes of Europe were slow in responding to the call of the pope, largely due to national rivalries. England and France's Hundred Years' War had just ended in 1453. Forces led by John Hunyadi (Hungarian: Hunyadi János), Captain-General of Hungary, met the Turks and defeated them at Belgrade on 22 July 1456. Shortly after his victory, Hunyadi himself died of a fever. On 29 June 1456, Callixtus III ordered the church bells to be rung at noon (see noon bell) as a call to prayer for the welfare of those defending Belgrade. To commemorate this victory, Callixtus III ordered the Feast of the Transfiguration to be held annually on 6 August.

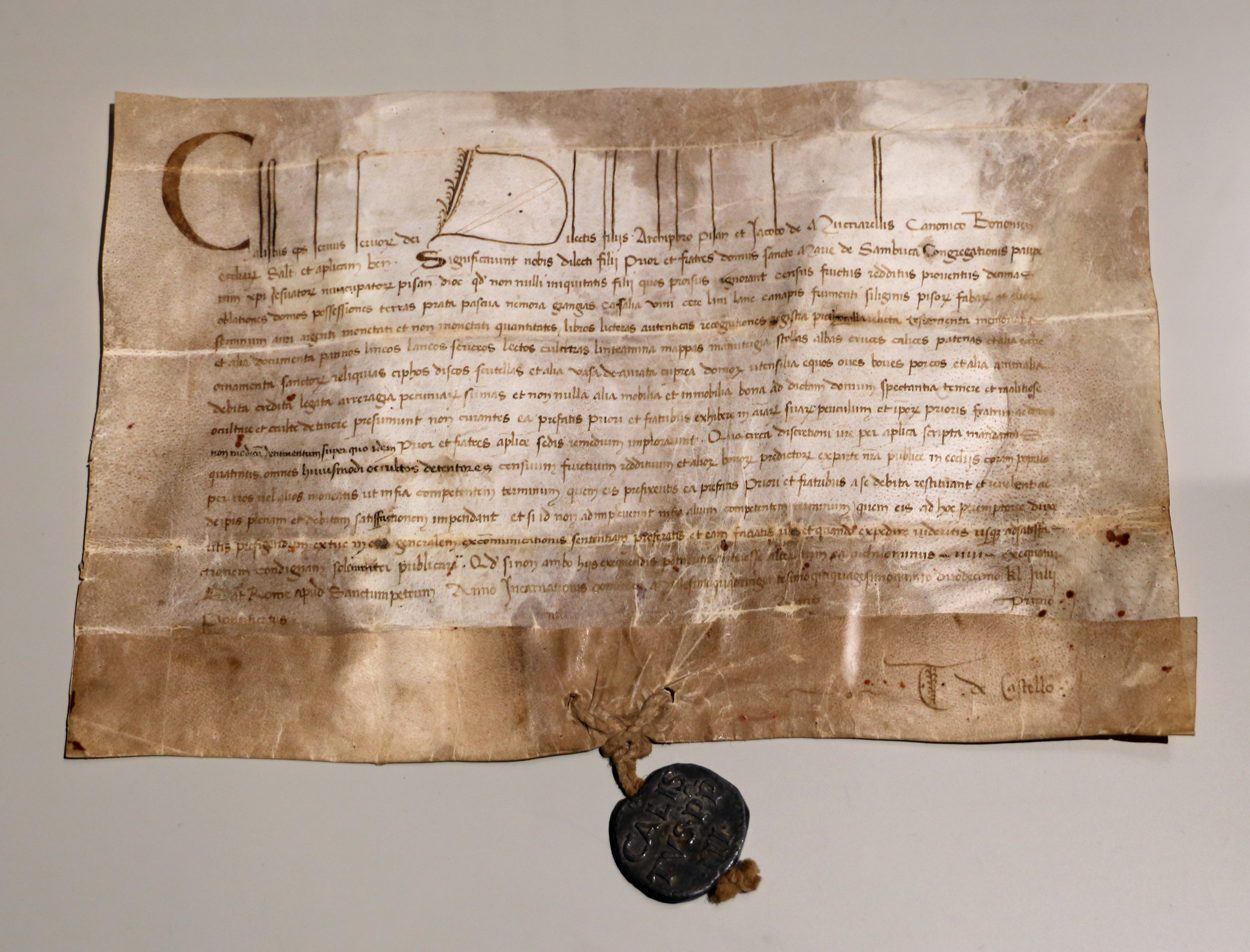
A bull of Callixtus III

In 1456 the pope issued the papal bull Inter Caetera (not to be confused with Inter Caetera of 1493), reaffirming the earlier bulls Dum Diversas and Romanus Pontifex which recognized Portugal's trade rights in territories it had discovered along the West African coast. This confirmation of Romanus Pontifex also gave the Portuguese the military Order of Christ under Henry the Navigator.

Callixtus III ordered a new trial for Joan of Arc (c. 1412–1431), at which she was posthumously vindicated. Callixtus III canonized the following four saints during his pontificate: Vincent Ferrer (3 June 1455), Osmund (1 January 1457), Albert of Trapani (15 October 1457), and Rose of Viterbo (1457).

Callixtus III elevated nine new cardinals into the cardinalate in two consistories on 20 February 1456 and 17 December 1456, two of whom were cardinal nephews. The first of them was Rodrigo de Borgia who later became Pope Alexander VI (1492–1503), infamous for his corruption and immorality. The second was Luis Julian de Milà.

The pope approved of the establishment of the University of Greifswald in 1456.

According to one story that first appeared in a 1475 posthumous biography and was subsequently embellished and popularized by Pierre-Simon Laplace, Callixtus III excommunicated the 1456 appearance of Halley's Comet, believing it to be an ill omen for the Christian defenders of Belgrade from the besieging armies of the Ottoman Empire. No known primary source supports the authenticity of this account. The 29 June 1456 papal bull of Callixtus III calling for a public prayer for the success of the crusade makes no mention of the comet. By 6 August, when the Turkish siege was broken, the comet had not been visible in either Europe or Turkey for several weeks.

== Death ==
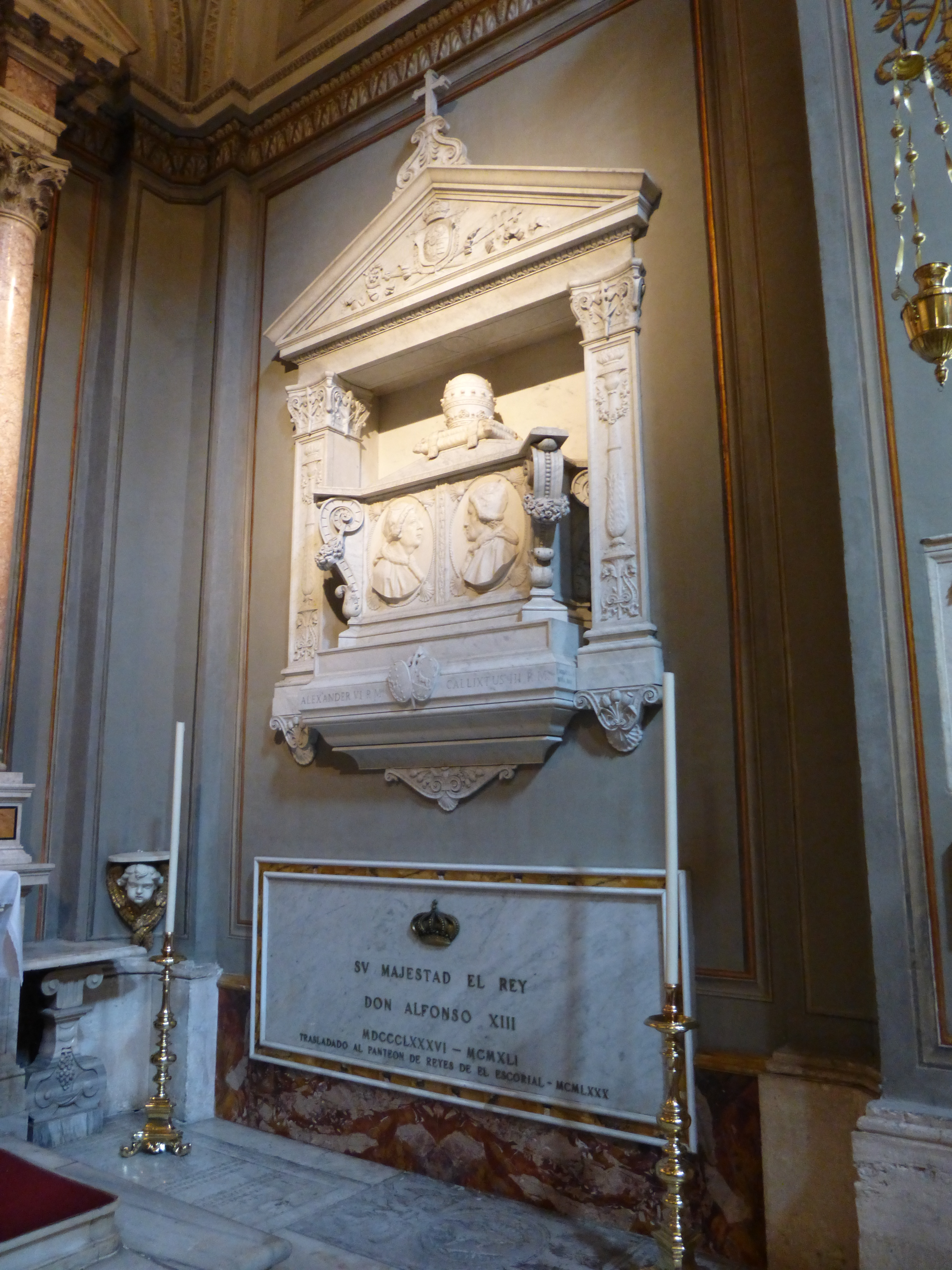
Tomb of Callixtus III and Alexander VI in Santa Maria in Monserrato degli Spagnoli

Callixtus III died on 6 August 1458. His remains were transferred in 1586 and again in 1610 with the remains of his nephew Alexander VI to Santa Maria in Monserrato. His remains were transferred once more on 21 August 1889 in the Chapel of San Diego de Alcalá in the Rome's Church of Santa Maria in Monserrato degli Spagnoli. In his will he left 5000 ducats to establish a hospital.

== Legacy ==
Catholic historian Ludwig von Pastor opined:

"Except for his nepotism, Calixtus III deserves high praise, more especially for the energy, constancy and purpose which he displayed in dealing with the burning question of the day – the protection of Western civilization from the Turkish power. In this matter he gave a grand example to Christendom, and it is to be observed that in the midst of the military and political interest which claimed so large a share of his time and attention, he did not neglect the internal affairs of the Church, and vigorously opposed heresies."

== See also ==
- List of popes from the Borgia family
- Cardinals created by Callixtus III
- Route of the Borgias

Catholic Church titles
Preceded by Nicholas V	Pope; 8 April 1455 – 6 August 1458	Succeeded by Pius II
Preceded by Hug de Llupià	Bishop of Valencia; 20 August 1429 – 8 April 1455	Succeeded by Rodrigo de Borja
Preceded by Louis de Luxembourg	Cardinal-Priest of Santi Quattro Coronati; 12 July 1444 – 8 April 1458	Succeeded by Luis Juan del Milà y Borja
