= List of popes from the Borgia family =

European papal family of Spanish origin

The Borgias, also known as the Borjas, were a European papal family of Spanish origin that became prominent during the Renaissance. The family produced three popes of the Catholic Church:

- Callixtus III (born Alfons de Borja; 1378–1458) – served as pope from 8 April 1455 until his death on 6 August 1458
- Alexander VI (born Rodrigo Lanzol Borgia; 1431–1503) – served as pope from 11 August 1492 until his death on 18 August 1503; his maternal uncle was Callixtus III
- Innocent X (born Giovanni Battista Pamphilj (or Pamphili); 1574–1655) – served as pope from 15 September 1644 until his death on 7 January 1655; he was the great-great-great-grandson of Alexander VI, but his surname was not Borgia

== See also ==
- List of popes
- Route of the Borgias
