= Rodrigo de Borja (Spanish noble) =

Spanish nobleman, great-grandfather of Pope Alexander VI

Rodrigo de Borja (born 1349; date of death unknown) was a noble of the prestigious House of Borja in the Kingdom of Valencia whose origin was in the town of Borja in Aragon. He was head of house for this branch of the Borja family based on Ventres street in Xàtiva, the same branch which would later go on to become the Borgia family in Italy.

== Biography ==
Rodrigo de Borja was born in 1349 in Xàtiva, Kingdom of Valencia. He was the son of Gonzalo Gil de Borja, who served as Jury of the Military Establishment of Xàtiva in 1340, and his wife whose name is not known. His paternal grandfather was Gil de Borja, also of Xàtiva and head of the House of Borja residing on Ventres street. His paternal great-grandfather, Rodrigo de Borja, the presumed founder of their branch of House of Borja, participated in the Conquest of Orihuela in 1272. Rodrigo's great-grandson would go on to become Pope Alexander VI.

== Marriage and descendants ==
Rodrigo de Borja married Sabina Anglesola and had at least one child with her. He later remarried, to Francesca d'Oms de Fenollet (d. 1375). Although their recorded son, Rodrigo Gil de Borja y Fennolet, is attributed to Sabina Anglesola, Rodrigo's first wife, their son was still named after Rodrigo's second wife.
