= Lordship of Torre de Canals =

Lordship in the Crown of Aragon

The Lordship of Torre de Canals was a lordship in the Crown of Aragon located in and around the town of Torre de Canals. The town is located in the present day Valencian Community and no longer exists as a lordship.

== History ==
Originally created by King James I of Aragon as a reward for Count Denis of Hungary, the title would eventually be inherited by a minor branch of the House of Borja (the main branch in the early- to mid-14th century, being based in Xàtiva). This minor branch would soon grow to eclipse the family's main branch with the ascension of two popes, Calixtus III and Alexander VI. Throughout their reign, the Borjas or Borgias maintained a base of power from the Torre de Canals and the greater Valencia region. A tower from their former palace still stands today. Calixtus III himself was actually born in this same palace, as it had belonged to his father, Juan Domingo de Borja y Doncel.

In 1506, the Señorío was sold to the nearby city of Xàtiva, and the lands and fortifications of the Señorío fell into disrepair.

== List of title holders over Torre de Canals ==
The following is an incomplete list of the lords of Torre de Canals:

- 1244 - Conde Denis of Hungary - Granted by order of King James I of Aragon
- 1318 - Gizpert, Viscount of Castellnou
- 1325 - Pedro de Urrea, the bishop-elect of Tarazona
- ? - Juan de Urrea
- 1350 - Peter IV of Aragon - Control reverts to the king after the deaths of Juan de Urrea and his wife Elvira Cornel.
- ? - Beautriu de Borja
- ? - Juan Domingo de Borja y Doncel, father of Pope Calixtus III
- 1506 - City of Xàtiva

== See also ==
- House of Borja
- Crown of Aragon
- Calixtus III
