= Pope Alexander VI =

Head of the Catholic Church from 1492 to 1503

Pope Alexander VI Valentinus ("The Valencian")
- Bishop of Rome
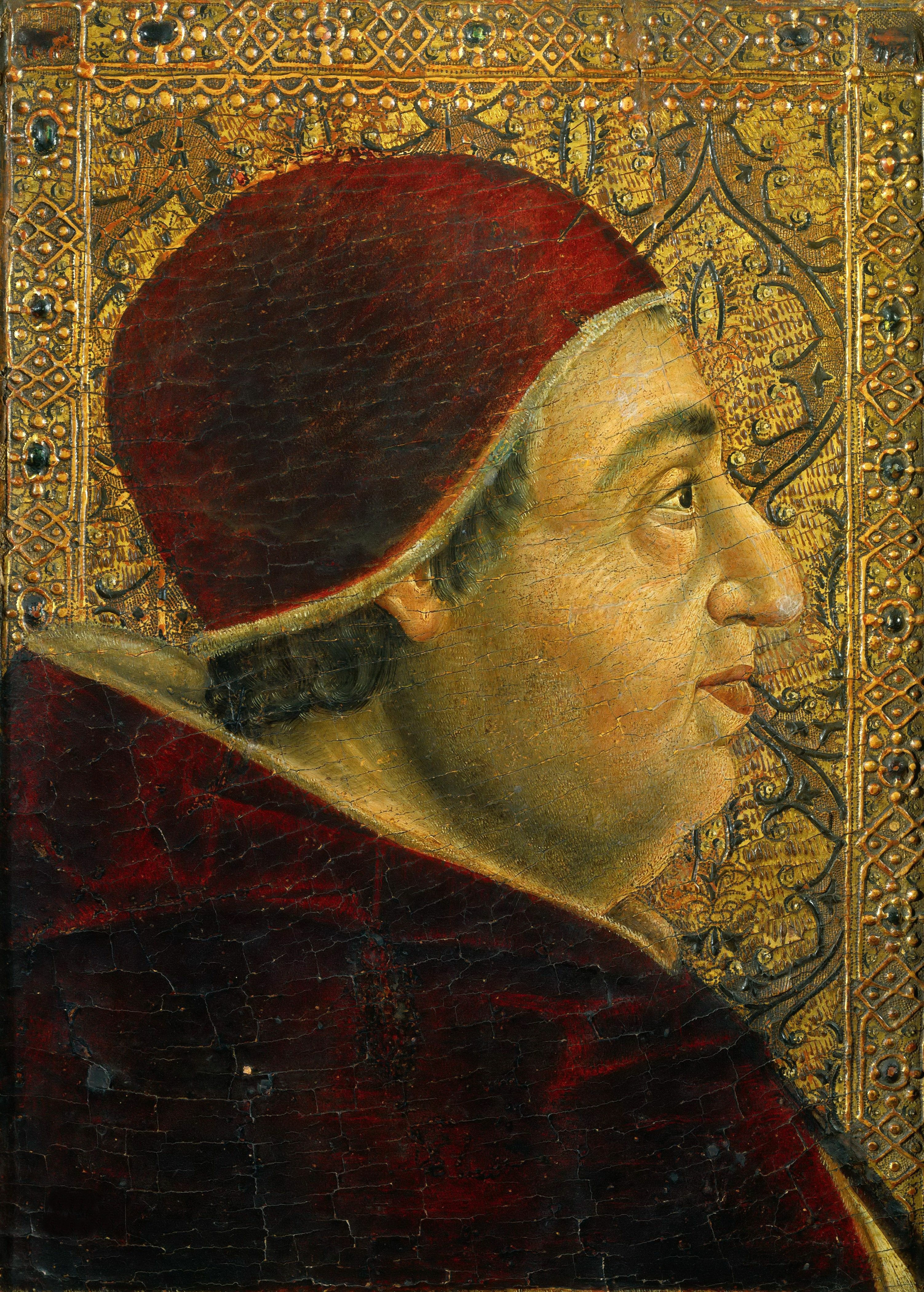
- Portrait attributed to Pedro Berruguete (c. 1495, oil on canvas, Vatican Museums)
- Church: Catholic Church
- Papacy began: 11 August 1492
- Papacy ended: 18 August 1503
- Predecessor: Innocent VIII
- Successor: Pius III
- Previous posts: Cardinal-Deacon of San Nicola in Carcere (1456–1471); Administrator of Girona (1457–1458); Cardinal-Deacon of Santa Maria in Via Lata (1458–1492); Administrator of Valencia (1458–1492); Bishop of Urgell (1467–1472); Cardinal-Bishop of Albano (1471–1476); Cardinal-Bishop of Porto e Santa Rufina (1476–1492); Administrator of Cartagena (1482–1492); Administrator of Mallorca (1489–1492); Administrator of Eger (1491–1492); Archbishop of Valencia (1492)

Orders
- Ordination: 1468
- Consecration: 30 October 1471
- Created cardinal: 17 September 1456 by Callixtus III

Personal details
- Born: Roderic de Borja c. 1431 Xàtiva, Valencia
- Died: 18 August 1503 (aged 71–72) Rome, Papal States
- Buried: Santa Maria in Monserrato degli Spagnoli
- Denomination: Catholic Church
- Parents: Jofré Borja y Llançol i Escrivà; Isabel de Borja
- Partner: Vannozza dei Cattanei
- Children: Pier Luigi; Girolama; Isabella; Cesare; Giovanni; Lucrezia; Gioffre; Others disputed; (Note: Claims of paternity and numbers of children are disputed. See G. J. Meyer, Christopher Hibbert, and Ferdinand Gregorovius. There are claims about Cesare, Giovanni, Lucrezia, Gioffre (or Goffredo), Girolama (or Jeronima), Isabella, Pier Luigi (or Pedro Luis), Bernardo, Rodrigo, Giovanni Infans Romanus, and Laura.)
- Education: University of Bologna
- Coat of arms: Alexander VI's coat of arms

Papal styles of Pope Alexander VI
- Reference style: His Holiness
- Spoken style: Your Holiness
- Religious style: Holy Father
- Posthumous style: None

Pope Alexander VI (Note: Italian: Alessandro VI; Valencian: Alexandre VI; Spanish: Alejandro VI) (born Roderic de Borja y Llançol; (Note: Italian: Rodrigo Borgia; Valencian: Roderic Llançol i de Borja; Spanish: Rodrigo Lanzol y de Borja) c. 1431 – 18 August 1503) was head of the Catholic Church and sovereign of the Papal States from 11 August 1492 until his death in 1503. A member of the House of Borgia, he is one of several popes alleged to have been sexually active during their papacy. Alexander reigned as pope during the High Renaissance, a period in which nepotism and simony were widespread among the clergy.

Born into the prominent Borja family in Xàtiva in the Kingdom of Valencia under the Crown of Aragon (in present-day Spain), he was known as Roderic de Borja, and he is commonly referred to by the Italianized form as Rodrigo Borgia. He studied law at the University of Bologna. He was ordained deacon and made a cardinal in 1456 after the election of his uncle as Pope Callixtus III, and a year later he became vice-chancellor of the Catholic Church. He proceeded to serve in the Roman Curia under the next four popes, acquiring significant influence and wealth in the process. In 1492, Rodrigo was elected pope, taking the name Alexander VI.

Alexander's papal bulls of 1493 confirmed or reconfirmed the rights of the Spanish crown in the New World following the finds of Christopher Columbus in 1492. During the second Italian war, Alexander VI supported his son Cesare Borgia as a condottiero for the French king. The scope of his foreign policy was to gain the most advantageous terms for his family.

Alexander is one of the most controversial of the Renaissance popes, partly because he acknowledged fathering several children by his mistresses. As a result, his Italianized Valencian surname, Borgia, became a byword for libertinism and nepotism, which are traditionally considered as characterizing his pontificate.

== Birth and family ==
Roderic de Borja y Llançol was born around 1431, in the town of Xàtiva near Valencia, one of the component realms of the Crown of Aragon, in what is now Spain. He was named for his paternal grandfather, Rodrigo Gil de Borja y Fennolet. His parents were Jofré Borja y Llançol i Escrivà (died bef. 24 March 1437) and his Aragonese wife and distant cousin Isabel de Borja y Cavanilles (died 19 October 1468), daughter of Juan Domingo de Borja y Doncel. He had a younger brother, Pedro. His family name is written Borja y Llançol in Valencian and Lanzol in Castilian. In 1455 following his uncle's elevation to the papacy Alonso de Borja was Italianized to Alfonso Borgia as Callixtus III; in addition at this time that would change their spelling from Borja to Borgia. His cousin Callixtus's nephew Luis de Milà y de Borja became a cardinal.

Gerard Noel writes that Rodrigo's father was Jofré de Borja y Escrivà, making Rodrigo a Borja from his mother and father's side. However, Cesare, Lucrezia, and Jofre were known to be of Llançol paternal lineage. G. J. Meyer suggests that Rodrigo would have likely been uncle (from a shared female family member) to the children, and attributes the confusion to attempts to connect Rodrigo as the father of Giovanni (Juan), Cesare, Lucrezia, and Gioffre (Jofré in Valencian), who were surnamed Llançol i Borja.

== Appearance and personality ==
Peter de Roo gives a flattering summary of contemporary descriptions of Alexander, relating him to have been "of a medium complexion, with dark eyes and slightly full lips, of robust health"; in later life, he reports that "his aspect [was declared] to be venerable and far more august than an ordinary human appearance", and that he was "so familiar with Holy Writ, that his speeches were fairly sparkling with well-chosen texts of the Sacred Books".

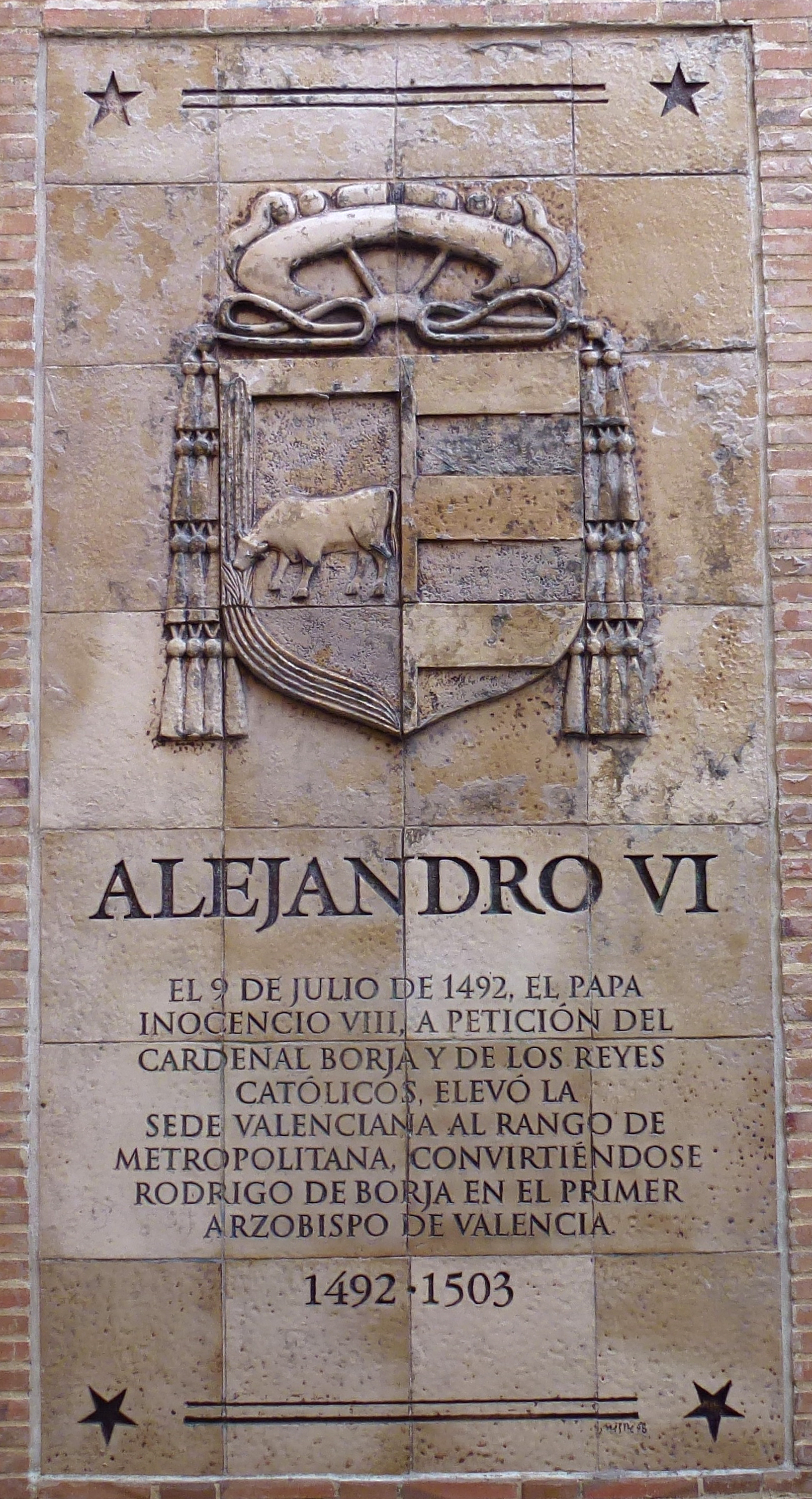
Plaque outside the Archbishop's Palace, Valencia. Translation: Alexander VI, 9 July 1492, Pope Innocent VIII, at the request of Cardinal Borja and the Catholic Monarchs, raised the Valencian See to the rank of metropolitan, making Rodrigo of Borja the first Archbishop of Valencia 1492–1503.

== Career ==
=== Overview ===
Roderic de Borja's career in the Church began in 1445 at the age of 14, when he was appointed sacristan at the Cathedral of Valencia by his influential uncle, Alfons Cardinal de Borja, who had been appointed a cardinal by Pope Eugene IV the previous year. In 1448, de Borja became canon at the cathedrals of Valencia, Barcelona, and Segorbe. His uncle, Cardinal de Borja, persuaded Pope Nicholas V to allow young de Borja to perform this role in absentia and receive the associated income, so that de Borja could travel to Rome. While in Rome, Rodrigo Borgia (as his name was usually spelled in Italian) studied under Gaspare da Verona, a humanist tutor. He then studied law at Bologna where he graduated, not simply as Doctor of Law, but as "the most eminent and judicious jurisprudent."

The election of his uncle, Alfons Cardinal de Borja, as Pope Callixtus III in 1455 enabled Borgia's appointments to other positions in the Church. These nepotistic appointments were characteristic of the era. Each pope during this period found himself surrounded by the servants and retainers of his predecessors who often owed their loyalty to the family of the pontiff who had appointed them. In 1455, he inherited his uncle's post as bishop of Valencia, and Callixtus appointed him Dean of Santa Maria in Xàtiva. The following year, he was ordained deacon and created cardinal-deacon of San Nicola in Carcere. Rodrigo Borgia's appointment as cardinal only occurred after Callixtus III asked the cardinals in Rome to create three new positions in the College of Cardinals, two for his nephews Rodrigo and Luis Juan de Milà, and one for the Prince Jaime of Portugal.

In 1457, Callixtus III assigned the young Cardinal de Borja (or Borgia in Italian) to go to Ancona as a Papal legate to quell a revolt. Borgia was successful in his mission, and his uncle rewarded him with his appointment as vice-chancellor of the Holy Roman Church. The position of vice-chancellor was both incredibly powerful and lucrative, and Borgia held this post for 35 years until his own election to the papacy in 1492. At the end of 1457, Rodrigo Cardinal Borgia's elder brother, Pedro Luis Borgia, fell ill, so Rodrigo temporarily filled Pedro Luis' position as captain-general of the papal army until he recovered. In 1458, Cardinal Borgia's uncle and greatest benefactor, Pope Callixtus, died.

In the papal election of 1458, Rodrigo Borgia was too young to seek the papacy himself, so he sought to support a cardinal who would maintain him as vice-chancellor. Borgia was one of the deciding votes in the election of Cardinal Piccolomini as Pope Pius II, and the new pope rewarded Borgia not only with maintaining the chancellorship but also with a lucrative abbey benefice and another titular church. In 1460, Pope Pius rebuked Cardinal Borgia for attending a private party which Pius had heard turned into an orgy. Borgia apologized for the incident but denied that there had been an orgy. Pope Pius forgave him, and the true events of the evening remain unknown. In 1462, Rodrigo Borgia had his first son, Pedro Luis, with an unknown mistress. He sent Pedro Luis to grow up in Spain. The following year, Borgia acceded to Pope Pius's call for cardinals to help fund a new crusade. Before embarking to lead the crusade personally, Pope Pius II fell ill and died, so Borgia would need to ensure the election of yet another ally to the papacy to maintain his position as vice-chancellor.

On the first ballot, the conclave of 1464 elected Borgia's friend Pietro Barbo as Pope Paul II. Borgia was in high standing with the new pope and retained his positions, including that of vice-chancellor. Paul II reversed some of his predecessor's reforms that diminished the power of the chancellory. Following the election, Borgia fell ill of the plague but recovered. Borgia had two daughters, Isabella (*1467) and Girolama (*1469), with an unknown mistress. He openly acknowledged all three of his children. Pope Paul II died suddenly in 1471.

While Borgia had acquired the reputation and wealth to mount a bid for the papacy in this conclave, there were only three non-Italians, making his election a near-impossibility. Consequently, Borgia continued his previous strategy of positioning himself as kingmaker. This time, Borgia gathered the votes to make Francesco della Rovere (the uncle of future Borgia rival Giuliano della Rovere) Pope Sixtus IV. Della Rovere's appeal was that he was a pious and brilliant Franciscan friar who lacked many political connections in Rome. He seemed to be the perfect cardinal to reform the Church, and the perfect cardinal for Borgia to maintain his influence. Sixtus IV rewarded Borgia for his support by promoting him to cardinal-bishop and consecrating him as the Cardinal-Bishop of Albano, requiring Borgia's ordination as a priest. Borgia also received a lucrative abbey from the pope and remained vice-chancellor. At the end of the year, the pope appointed Borgia to be the papal legate for Spain to negotiate a peace treaty between Castile and Aragon and to solicit their support for another crusade. In 1472, Borgia was appointed to be the papal chamberlain until his departure to Spain. Borgia arrived in his native Aragon in the summer, reuniting with family and meeting with King Juan II and Prince Ferdinand. The pope gave Cardinal Borgia discretion over whether to give dispensation for Ferdinand's marriage to his second cousin Isabella of Castile, and Borgia decided in favour of approving the marriage. The couple named Borgia to be the godfather of their first son in recognition of this decision. The marriage of Ferdinand and Isabella was critical in the unification of Castile and Aragon into Spain. Borgia also negotiated peace between Castile and Aragon and an end to the civil wars in the latter Kingdom, gaining the favour of the future King Ferdinand - who would go on to promote the interests of the Borgia family in Aragon. Borgia returned to Rome the following year, narrowly surviving a storm that sank a nearby galley that was carrying 200 men of the Borgia household.

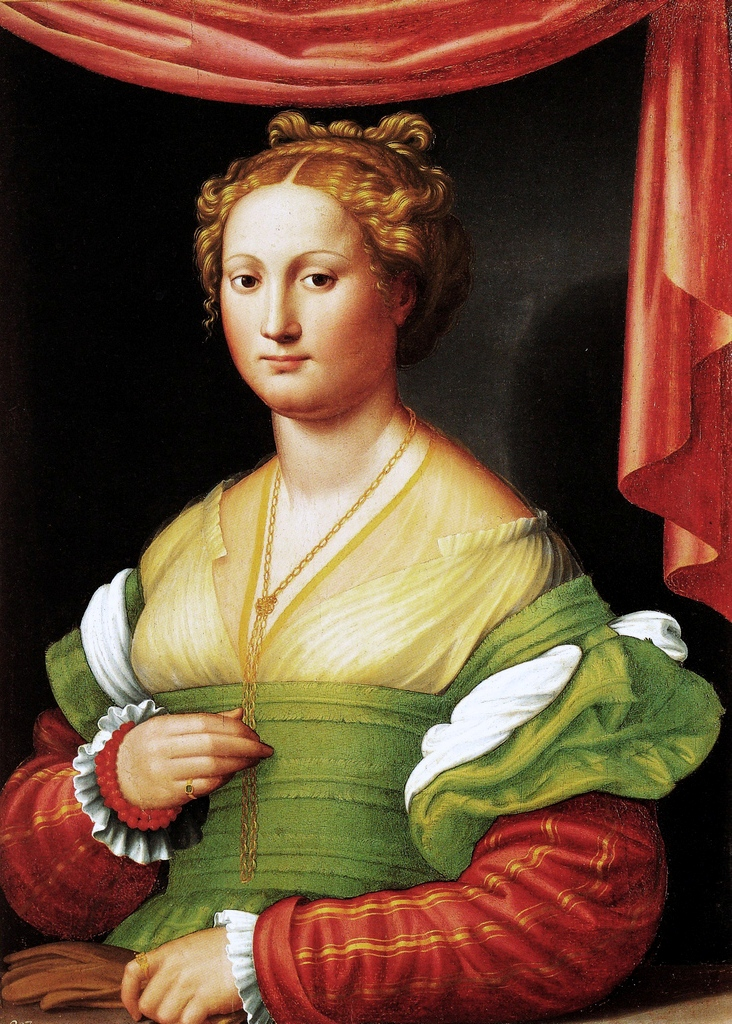
Vannozza dei Cattanei

Back in Rome, Borgia began his affair with Vannozza dei Cattenei which would yield four children: Cesare in 1475, Giovanni in 1474 or 1476, Lucrezia in 1480, and Gioffre in 1482. In 1476, Pope Sixtus appointed Borgia to be the cardinal-bishop of Porto. In 1480, the pope legitimized Cesare as a favour to Cardinal Borgia, and in 1482, the pope began to appoint the seven-year-old to church positions, demonstrating Borgia's intention to use his influence to promote his children. Contemporaneously, Borgia continued to add to his list of benefices, becoming the wealthiest cardinal by 1483. He also become Dean of the College of Cardinals in that year. In 1484, Pope Sixtus IV died, necessitating another election for Borgia to manipulate to his advantage.

Borgia was wealthy and powerful enough to mount a bid, but he faced competition from Giuliano della Rovere, the late pope's nephew. Della Rovere's faction had the advantage of being incredibly large as Sixtus had appointed many of the cardinals who would participate in the election. Borgia's attempts to gather enough votes included bribery and leveraging his close ties to Naples and Aragon. However, many of the Spanish cardinals were absent from the conclave and della Rovere's faction had an overwhelming advantage. Della Rovere chose to promote Cardinal Cibo as his preferred candidate, and Cibo wrote to the Borgia faction wanting to strike a deal. Once again, Borgia played kingmaker and conceded to Cardinal Cibo who became Pope Innocent VIII. Again, Borgia retained his position of vice-chancellor, successfully holding this position over the course of five papacies and four elections.

In 1485, Pope Innocent VIII nominated Borgia to become the Archbishop of Seville, a position that King Ferdinand II wanted for his own son. In response, Ferdinand angrily seized the Borgia estates in Aragon and imprisoned Borgia's son Pedro Luis. However, Borgia healed the relationship by turning down this appointment. Pope Innocent, at the urging of his close ally Giuliano della Rovere, decided to declare war against Naples, but Milan, Florence, and Aragon chose to support Naples over the pope. Borgia led the opposition within the College of Cardinals to this war, and King Ferdinand rewarded Borgia by making his son Pedro Luis the Duke of Gandia and arranging a marriage between his cousin Maria Enriquez and the new duke. Now, the Borgia family was directly tied to the royal families of Spain and Naples. While Borgia gained the favour of Spain, he stood opposed to the pope and the della Rovere family. As a part of his war opposition, Borgia sought to obstruct an alliance negotiation between the papacy and France. These negotiations were unsuccessful and in July 1486, the pope capitulated and ended the war. In 1488, Borgia's son Pedro Luis died, and Juan Borgia became the new duke of Gandia. In the following year, Borgia hosted the wedding ceremony between Orsino Orsini and Giulia Farnese, and within a few months, Farnese had become Borgia's new mistress. She was 15, and he was 58. Borgia continued to acquire new benefices with their large streams of income, including the bishopric of Majorca and Eger in Hungary. In 1492, Pope Innocent VIII died. Since Borgia was 61, this was likely his last chance to become pope.

=== Archbishop of Valencia ===
When his uncle Alonso de Borja (bishop of Valencia) was elected Pope Callixtus III, he "inherited" the post of bishop of Valencia. Sixteen days before the death of Pope Innocent VIII, he proposed Valencia as a metropolitan see and became the first archbishop of Valencia. When Rodrigo Borgia was elected pope as Alexander VI following the death of Innocent VIII, his son Cesare Borgia "inherited" the post as second archbishop of Valencia. The third and the fourth archbishops of Valencia were Juan de Borja and Pedro Luis de Borja, grandnephews of Alexander VI.

=== Election to the papacy ===
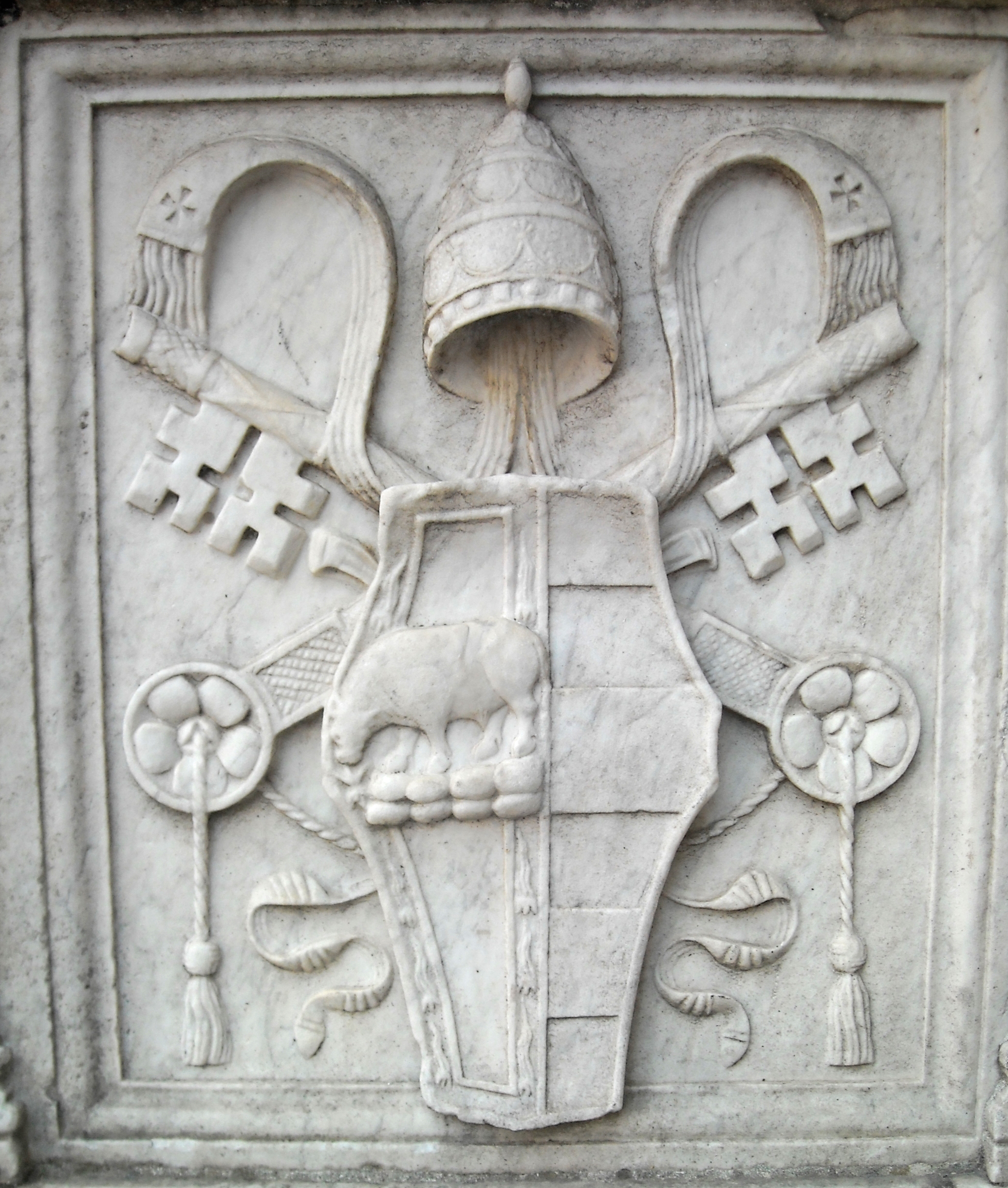
Coat of arms of Alexander VI – Castel Sant'Angelo, Rome

There was change in the constitution of the College of Cardinals during the course of the 15th century, especially under Sixtus IV and Innocent VIII. Of the 27 cardinals alive in the closing months of the reign of Innocent VIII no fewer than 10 were cardinal-nephews, eight were crown nominees, four were Roman nobles and one other had been given the cardinalate in recompense for his family's service to the Holy See; only four were able career churchmen.

On the death of Pope Innocent VIII on 25 July 1492, the three likely candidates for the Papacy were the 61-year-old Borgia, seen as an independent candidate, Ascanio Sforza for the Milanese, and Giuliano della Rovere, seen as a pro-French candidate. It was rumoured but not substantiated that Borgia succeeded in buying the largest number of votes and Sforza, in particular, was bribed with four mule-loads of silver. Mallett shows that Borgia was in the lead from the start and that the rumours of bribery began after the election with the distribution of benefices; Sforza and della Rovere were just as willing and able to bribe as anyone else. The benefices and offices granted to Sforza, moreover, would be worth considerably more than four mule-loads of silver. Johann Burchard, the conclave's master of ceremonies and a leading figure of the papal household under several popes, recorded in his diary that the 1492 conclave was a particularly expensive campaign. Della Rovere was bankrolled to the cost of 200,000 gold ducats by King Charles VIII of France, with another 100,000 supplied by the Republic of Genoa.

The leading candidates in the first ballot were Oliviero Carafa of Sforza's party with nine votes, and Giovanni Michiel and Jorge Costa, both of della Rovere's party with seven votes each. Borgia himself gathered seven votes. However, Borgia convinced Sforza to join with his camp through the promise of being appointed vice-chancellor as well as bribes that included benefices and perhaps four mule-loads of silver. With Sforza now canvassing for votes, Borgia's election was assured. Borgia was elected on 11 August 1492 and assumed the name of Alexander VI (due to confusion about the status of Pope Alexander V, elected by the Council of Pisa). Many inhabitants of Rome were happy with their new pope because he was a generous and competent administrator who had served for decades as vice-chancellor.

=== Early years in office ===
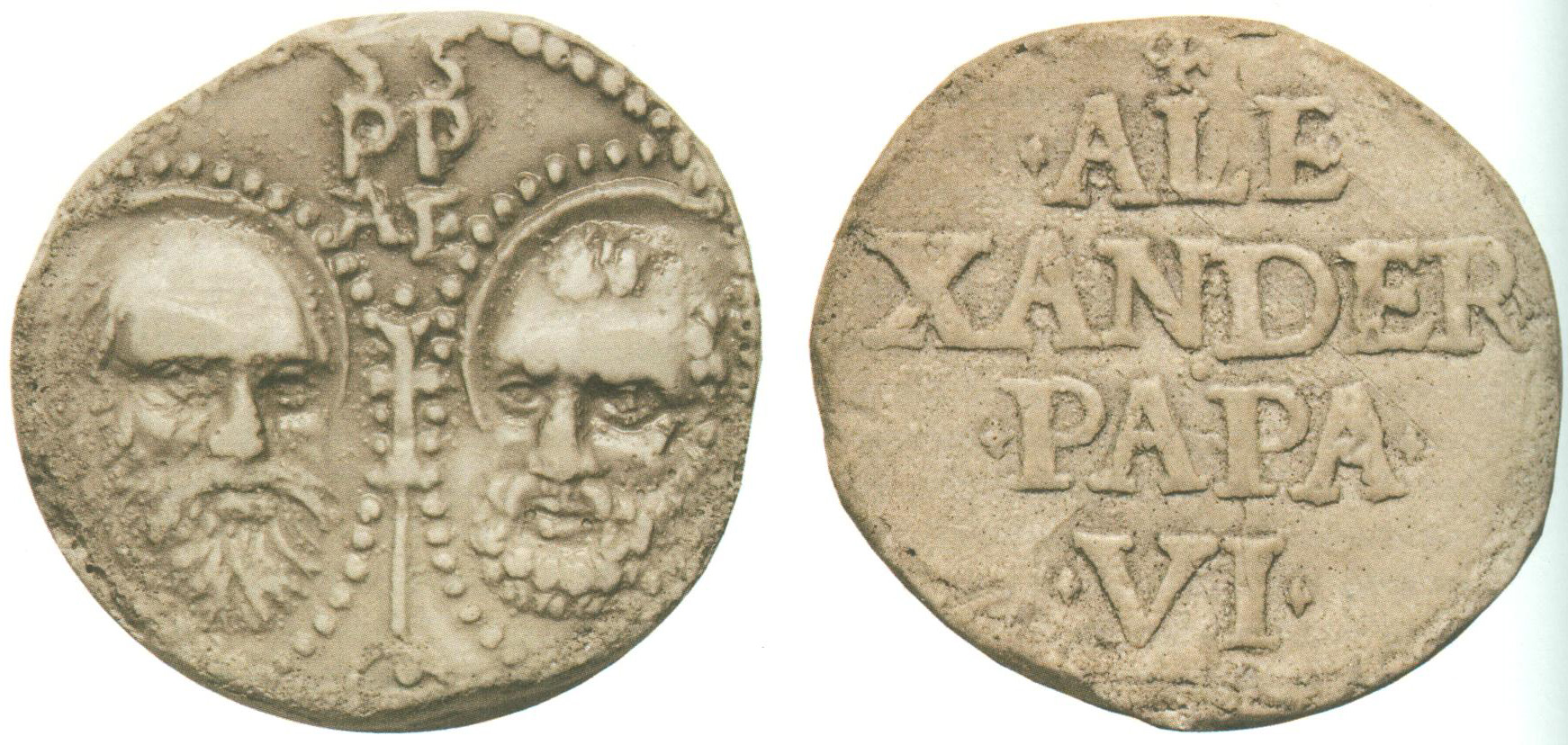
Papal bulla of Alexander VI

In contrast to the preceding pontificate, Pope Alexander VI adhered initially to strict administration of justice and orderly government. Before long, though, he began endowing his relatives at the Church's and at his neighbours' expense. Cesare Borgia, his son, while a youth of seventeen and a student at Pisa, was made Archbishop of Valencia, and Giovanni Borgia inherited the Spanish Dukedom of Gandia, the Borgias' ancestral home in Spain. For the Duke of Gandia and for Gioffre, also known as Goffredo, the Pope proposed to carve fiefs out of the Papal States and the Kingdom of Naples. Among the fiefs destined for the duke of Gandia were Cerveteri and Anguillara, lately acquired by Virginio Orsini, head of that powerful house. This policy brought Alexander into conflict with Ferdinand I of Naples as well as with Cardinal della Rovere, whose candidature for the papacy had been backed by Ferdinand. Della Rovere fortified himself in his bishopric of Ostia at the Tiber's mouth as Alexander formed a league against Naples (25 April 1493) and prepared for war.

Ferdinand allied himself with Florence, Milan, and Venice. He also appealed to Spain for help, but Spain was eager to be on good terms with the papacy to obtain the title to the recently discovered New World. Alexander, in the bull Inter caetera on 4 May 1493, divided the title between Spain and Portugal along a demarcation line. This became the basis of the Treaty of Tordesillas.

=== French involvement ===
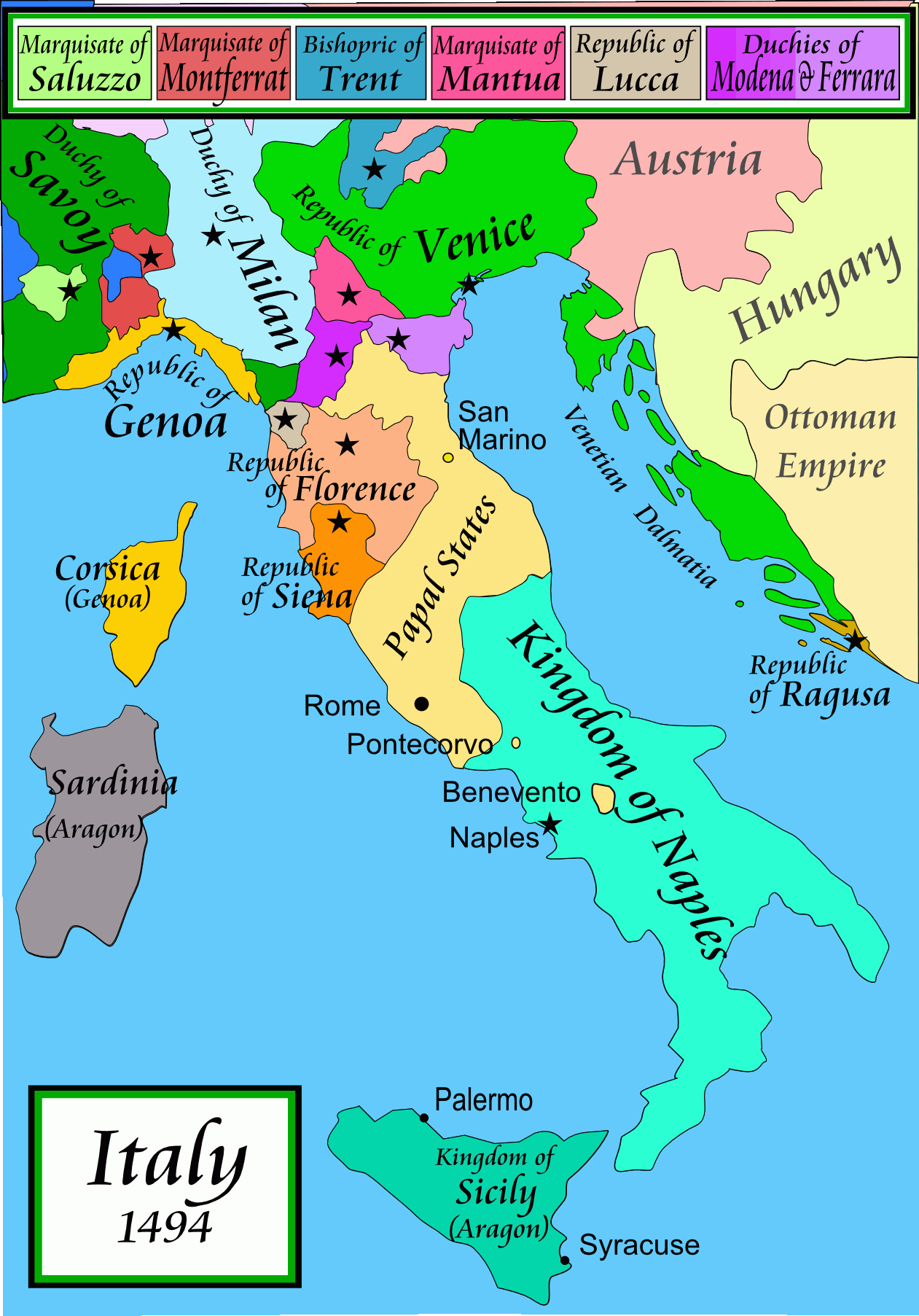
Italy, 1494

Pope Alexander VI made many alliances to secure his position. He sought help from Charles VIII of France (1483–1498), who was allied to Ludovico "il Moro" Sforza (the Moor, so-called because of his swarthy complexion), the de facto Duke of Milan, who needed French support to legitimise his rule. As King Ferdinand I of Naples was threatening to come to the aid of the rightful duke Gian Galeazzo Sforza, the husband of his granddaughter Isabella, Alexander encouraged the French king in his plan for the conquest of Naples.

But Alexander, always ready to seize opportunities to aggrandize his family, then adopted a double policy. Through the intervention of the Spanish ambassador, he made peace with Naples in July 1493 and cemented the peace by a marriage between his son Gioffre and Doña Sancha, another granddaughter of Ferdinand I. In order to dominate the College of Cardinals more completely, Alexander, in a move that created much scandal, created 12 new cardinals. Among the new cardinals was his own son Cesare, then only 18 years old. Alessandro Farnese (later Pope Paul III), the brother of one of the Pope's mistresses, Giulia Farnese, was also among the newly created cardinals.

On 25 January 1494, Ferdinand I died and was succeeded by his son Alfonso II (1494–1495). Charles VIII of France now advanced formal claims on the Kingdom of Naples. Alexander authorised him to pass through Rome, ostensibly on a crusade against the Ottoman Empire, without mentioning Naples. But when the French invasion became a reality Pope Alexander VI became alarmed, recognised Alfonso II as king of Naples, and concluded an alliance with him in exchange for various fiefs for his sons (July 1494). A military response to the French threat was set in motion: a Neapolitan army was to advance through Romagna and attack Milan, while the fleet was to seize Genoa. Both expeditions were badly conducted and failed, and on 8 September Charles VIII crossed the Alps and joined Ludovico il Moro at Milan. The Papal States were in turmoil, and the powerful Colonna faction seized Ostia in the name of France. Charles VIII rapidly advanced southward, and after a short stay in Florence, set out for Rome (November 1494).

Alexander appealed to Ascanio Sforza and even to the Ottoman Sultan Bayazid II for help. He tried to collect troops and put Rome in a state of defence, but his position was precarious. When the Orsini offered to admit the French to their castles, Alexander had no choice but to come to terms with Charles. On 31 December, Charles VIII entered Rome with his troops, the cardinals of the French faction, and Giuliano della Rovere. Alexander now feared that Charles might depose him for simony, and that the king would summon a council to nominate a new pope. Alexander was able to win over the bishop of Saint-Malo, who had much influence over the king, by making him a cardinal. Alexander agreed to send Cesare as legate to Naples with the French army; to deliver Cem Sultan, held as a hostage, to Charles VIII, and to give Charles Civitavecchia (16 January 1495). On 28 January Charles VIII departed for Naples with Cem and Cesare, but the latter slipped away to Spoleto. Neapolitan resistance collapsed, and Alfonso II fled and abdicated in favour of his son Ferdinand II. Ferdinand was abandoned by all and also had to escape, and the Kingdom of Naples was conquered with surprising ease.

=== French in retreat ===
A reaction against Charles VIII soon set in, for all the European powers were alarmed at his success. On 31 March 1495 the Holy League was formed among the pope, the emperor, Venice, Ludovico il Moro and Ferdinand of Spain. The League was ostensibly formed against the Turks, but in reality it was made to expel the French from Italy. Charles VIII had himself crowned King of Naples on 12 May, but a few days later began his retreat northward. He met the League at Fornovo and cut his way through them and was back in France by November. Ferdinand II was reinstated at Naples soon afterwards, with Spanish help. The expedition, if it produced no material results, demonstrated the foolishness of the so-called "politics of equilibrium", the Medicean doctrine of preventing one of the Italian principates from overwhelming the rest and uniting them under its hegemony.

Charles VIII's belligerence in Italy had made it transparent that the "politics of equilibrium" did nothing but render the country unable to defend itself against a powerful invading force. Italy was shown to be very vulnerable to the predations of the powerful nation-states, France and Spain, that had forged themselves during the previous century. Alexander VI now followed the general tendency of all the princes of the day to crush the great feudatories and establish a centralized despotism. In this manner, he was able to take advantage of the defeat of the French in order to break the power of the Orsini. From that time on, Alexander was able to build himself an effective power base in the Papal States.

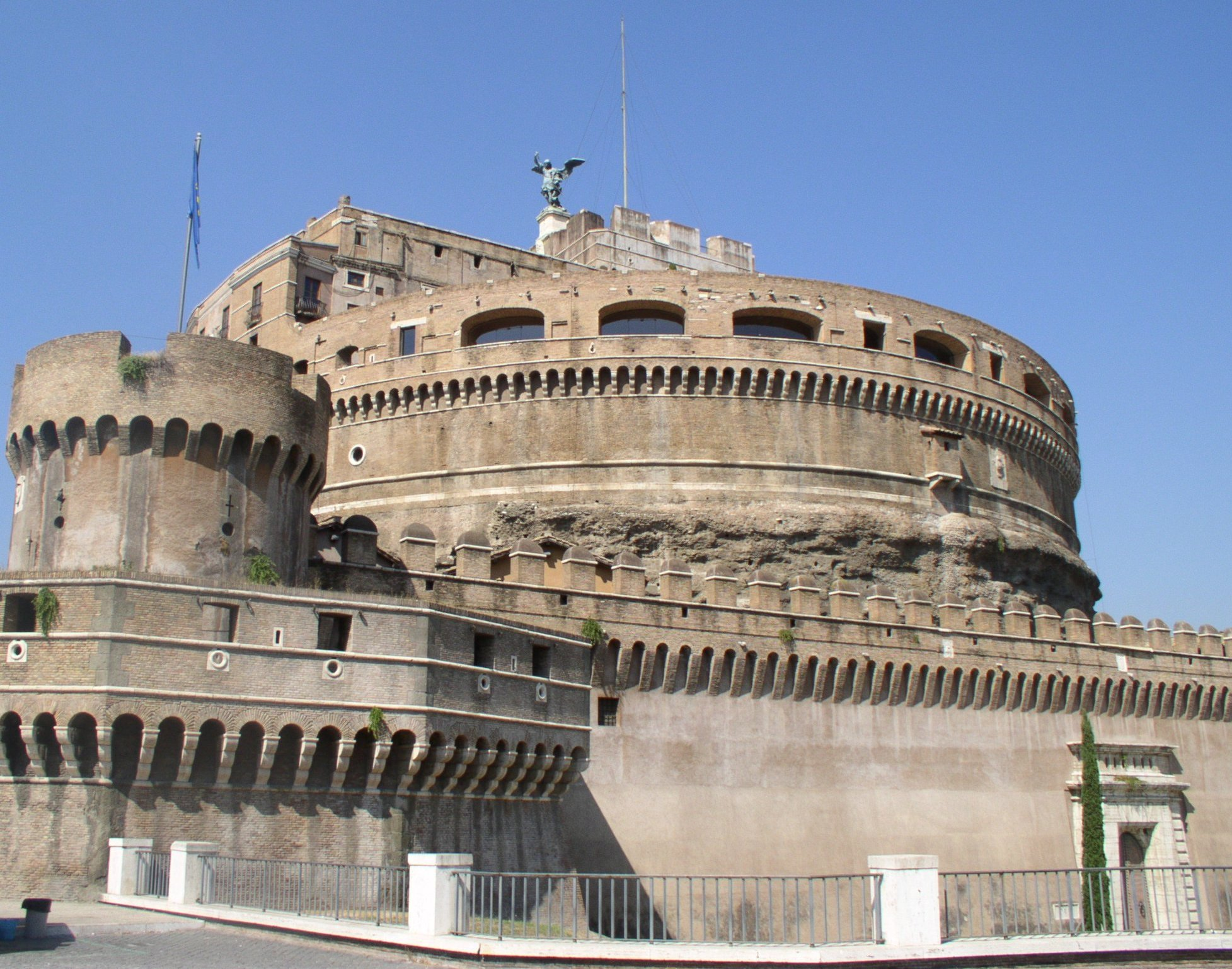
Castel Sant'Angelo in Rome

Virginio Orsini, who had been captured by the Spanish, died a prisoner at Naples, and the Pope confiscated his property. The rest of the Orsini clan still held out, defeating the papal troops sent against them under Guidobaldo da Montefeltro, Duke of Urbino and Giovanni Borgia, Duke of Gandia, at Soriano (January 1497). Peace was made through Venetian mediation, the Orsini paying 50,000 ducats in exchange for their confiscated lands; the Duke of Urbino, whom they had captured, was left by the pope to pay his own ransom. The Orsini remained very powerful, and Pope Alexander VI could count on none but his 3,000 Spanish troops. His only success had been the capture of Ostia and the submission of the Francophile cardinals Colonna and Savelli.

On 14 June, Alexander's son, Juan, the Duke of Gandia– who had recently been made Duke of Benevento and had a "questionable" lifestyle– disappeared. On 16 June, his corpse was pulled from the Tiber River. Alexander, overwhelmed with grief, shut himself in his chambers and did not eat, drink, or sleep for several days. He declared that henceforth the moral reform of the Church would be the sole object of his life. Every effort was made to discover the assassin. No conclusive explanation was ever reached, and it may be that the crime was simply as a result of one of the Duke's sexual liaisons.

=== Crime ===
Mallett asserts that there is no evidence that the Borgias resorted to poisoning, judicial murder, or extortion to fund their schemes and the defense of the Papal States. He also stated that the only contemporary accusations of poisoning were from some of their servants, extracted under torture by Alexander's bitter enemy Della Rovere, who succeeded him as Pope Julius II.

=== Savonarola ===
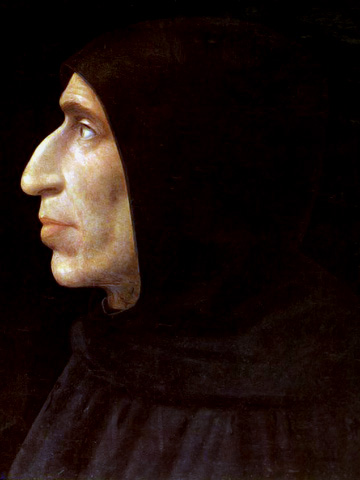
Girolamo Savonarola

The debased state of the Curia was a major scandal. Opponents, such as the powerful Florentine friar Girolamo Savonarola, launched invectives against papal corruption and appealed for a general council to confront the papal abuses. Alexander is reported to have been reduced to laughter when Savonarola's denunciations were related to him. Nevertheless, he appointed Sebastian Maggi to investigate the friar, and he responded on 16 October 1495:

We are displeased at the disturbed state of affairs in Florence, the more so in that it owes its origin to your preaching. For you predict the future and publicly declare that you do so by the inspiration of the Holy Spirit when you should be reprehending vice and praising virtue. ... Prophecies like these should not be made when your charge is to forward peace and concord. Moreover, these are not the time for such teachings, calculated as they are to produce discord even in times of peace let alone in times of trouble. ... Since, however, we have been most happy to learn from certain cardinals and from your letter that you are ready to submit yourself to the reproofs of the Church, as becomes a Christian and a religious, we are beginning to think that what you have done has not been done with an evil motive, but from a certain simple-mindedness and a zeal, however misguided, for the Lord's vineyard. Our duty, however, prescribes that we order you, under holy obedience, to cease from public and private preaching until you are able to come to our presence, not under armed escort as is your present habit, but safely, quietly and modestly as becomes a religious, or until we make different arrangements. If you obey, as we hope you will, we for the time being suspend the operation of our former Brief so that you may live in peace in accordance with the dictates of your conscience.

The hostility of Savonarola seems to have been political rather than personal, and the friar sent a letter of condolence to the pope on the death of the Duke of Gandia; "Faith, most Holy Father, is the one and true source of peace and consolation. ... Faith alone brings consolation from a far-off country." But eventually the Florentines tired of the friar's moralising and the Florentine government condemned the reformer to death, executing him on 23 May 1498.

=== Familial aggrandizement ===
The prominent Italian families looked down on the Spanish Borgia family, and they resented their power, which they sought for themselves. This is, at least partially, why both Pope Callixtus III and Pope Alexander VI gave powers to family members whom they could trust. (Note: "The Spaniards had been trying to take back their country from the Moors for almost 800 years. By the middle of the 15th century, this reconquest was almost complete, but Spain was still a hodgepodge of competing principalities and, because of its constant state of warfare, still a very backward country. In Italy, on the other hand, the Renaissance, which had hardly begun in Spain, had reached its high point and the Italians, in general, did not look kindly on a citizen of this backward country being elevated to the highest post in the Church. Remember, too, that the pope at the time, besides his spiritual powers, was a sovereign political power with large areas of the peninsula, nominally, at least, under his control. Italy was, politically, in a worse state than Spain. In the south, Naples was a fief of the pope, but its ruler, King Ferrante, refused to acknowledge the pope's authority. In the north of the peninsula, many small principalities vied for dominance and were often at war with one another, changing alliances as rapidly as opportunity invited. In the Papal States themselves, noble families, such as the Orsini and the Colonna, acted as petty tyrants in the cities and areas which they controlled, grinding down the people and constantly seeking to achieve their independence from their sovereign, the pope. These Roman families even sought to control the Papacy itself. It was probably only because they could not agree on an Italian successor to Nicholas V that the elderly Callistus had been elected; one who, in all probability, would not live long...Callistus III was acknowledged by all as religious and austere, though severely criticized for his largesse to his family. But he was surrounded by enemies both within the Church and among the rulers of Europe. When elected, he did what all leaders do, he surrounded himself with people whom he believed he could trust. A Spaniard in Italy, he was hard-pressed to find such trustworthiness except from members of his own family; hence his patronage of them, though it is not to be denied that it was probably also for personal reasons.")

Papal bull Desiderando nui, 1499

In these circumstances, Alexander, feeling more than ever that he could rely only on his own kin, turned his thoughts to further family aggrandizement. He had annulled Lucrezia's marriage to Giovanni Sforza, who had responded to the suggestion that he was impotent with the unsubstantiated counterclaim that Alexander and Cesare indulged in incestuous relations with Lucrezia, in 1497. (Note: "As for her reputation, there is absolutely no evidence for the rumors of incest with one or more of her brothers – or indeed with her father – apart from that given by her first husband, Giovanni Sforza, during the divorce proceedings, during which several other baseless accusations were leveled in both directions.") Unable to arrange a union between Cesare and the daughter of King Frederick IV of Naples (who had succeeded Ferdinand II the previous year), he induced Frederick by threats to agree to a marriage between the Duke of Bisceglie, a natural son of Alfonso II, and Lucrezia. Alexander and the new French king Louis XII entered a secret agreement; in exchange for a bull of divorce between the king and Joan of France (so he could marry Anne of Brittany) and making Georges d'Amboise (the king's chief advisor) the cardinal of Rouen, Cesare was given the duchy of Valentinois in France (chosen because it was homophonous with his nickname, Valentino, derived from his father's papal epithet Valentinus ("The Valencian", as seen on his coins denoting his origin in the Kingdom of Valencia, Spain), military assistance to help him subjugate the feudal princelings of papal Romagna, and a princess bride, Charlotte of Albret from the Kingdom of Navarre.

Alexander hoped that Louis XII's help would be more profitable to his house than that of Charles VIII had been. In spite of the remonstrances of Spain and of the Sforza, he allied himself with France in January 1499 and was joined by Venice. By autumn Louis XII was in Italy expelling Lodovico Sforza from Milan. With French success seemingly assured, the Pope determined to deal drastically with Romagna, which although nominally under papal rule was divided into a number of practically independent lordships on which Venice, Milan, and Florence cast hungry eyes. Cesare, empowered by the support of the French, began to attack the turbulent cities one by one in his capacity as nominated gonfaloniere (standard bearer) of the church. But the expulsion of the French from Milan and the return of Lodovico Sforza interrupted his conquests, and he returned to Rome early in 1500.

=== The Jubilee (1500) ===
In the Jubilee year 1500, Alexander ushered in the custom of opening a holy door on Christmas Eve and closing it on Christmas Day the following year. After consulting with his Master of Ceremonies, Johann Burchard, Pope Alexander VI opened the first holy door in St. Peter's Basilica on Christmas Eve 1499, and papal representatives opened the doors in the other three patriarchal basilicas. For this, Pope Alexander had a new opening created in the portico of St. Peter's and commissioned a marble door. (Note: "The holy year 1500 definitively ushered in the custom of opening a holy door on Christmas Eve and closing it the following year on Christmas Day. Alexander opened the first holy door in St. Peter's Basilica on Christmas Eve, 1499, and papal legates opened the doors in the other three patriarchal basilicas. For this occasion, Pope Alexander had a new opening created in the portico of St. Peter's and commissioned a door, made of marble, 3.5 meters high and 2.2 wide. It lasted until 1618 when another door was installed in the new basilica. The door, in turn, was replaced in 1950 by the bronze door, which is still in use. In a ceremony strikingly similar in many ways to today's ritual opening of a holy door, Alexander was carried in the gestatorial chair to the portico of St. Peter's. He and the members of his retinue, bearing long candles, processed to the holy door, as the choir intoned Psalm 118:19–20: "Open for me the gate of Yahweh, where the upright go in." The pope knocked thrice on the door, it gave way (assisted from within by workers), and everyone then crossed the threshold to enter into a period of penance and reconciliation. Thus, Pope Alexander, a lover of pomp and ceremony, formalized the rite of opening a holy door and began a tradition that continues, with few variations, to this day. Similar rites were held at the other patriarchal basilicas. Alexander was also the first to institute a special rite for the closing of a holy door. On the feast of the Epiphany, 6 January 1501, two cardinals – one with a silver brick and the other with a gold one – symbolically began to seal the holy door. Basilica workers known as sanpietrini completed the task, which included placing small coins and medals, minted during the holy year, inside the wall.") (Note: "[A]ll the clergy of the city were invited to the opening of the [1500] Jubilee. The pope himself performed this ceremony on Christmas Eve, 1499, having taken pains to settle all the details beforehand with his Master of Ceremonies. The ceremonial observed on these occasions was no modern invention, but, as the Bull of Indiction expressly says, was founded on ancient rites and full of symbolic meaning. According to Burchard, the crowd which assisted at these solemnities numbered 200,000 persons. Although this may be an exaggeration, still it is certain that, in spite of the troubles of the times and the insecurity in Rome itself, the numbers attending this Jubilee were very large.")

Alexander was carried in the sedia gestatoria to St. Peter's. He and his assistants, bearing candles, processed to the holy door, as the choir chanted Psalm 118:19–20. The pope knocked on the door three times, workers moved it from the inside, and everyone then crossed the threshold to enter into a period of penance and reconciliation. Thus, Pope Alexander formalized the rite and began a longstanding tradition that is still in practice. Similar ceremonies were held at the other three basilicas.

Alexander instituted a special rite for the closing of a holy door, as well. On the Feast of the Epiphany in 1501, two cardinals began to seal the holy door with two bricks, one silver and one gold. Sampietrini (basilica workers) (Note: "The permanent group of skilled workers and artisans, in every trade, who with their assistants take care of St. Peter's Basilica.") completed the seal, placing specially-minted coins and medals inside the wall.

== Personal life ==
Of Alexander's many mistresses, one of his favourites was Vannozza dei Cattanei, born in 1442, and who was married to three different men. The relationship began in 1470, and she had four children whom the pope openly acknowledged as his own: Cesare (born 1475), Giovanni, afterwards duke of Gandia (commonly known as Juan, born 1476), Lucrezia (born 1480), and Gioffre (Goffredo in Italian, born 1481).

Rodrigo only legitimized his children after becoming pope. He had pretended that his four children with Vannozza were his niece and nephews and that they were fathered by Vannozza's husbands. G. J. Meyer argued that the birth dates of the four children in comparison with Alexander's known whereabouts preclude him from having fathered any of them. His "acknowledgement" merely consisted of addressing them as "beloved son / daughter" in correspondence (while applying the same address to, e.g., Ferdinand II of Aragon and Isabella I of Castile in the same letter).

Another mistress was the beautiful Giulia Farnese ("Giulia la Bella"), wife of Orsino Orsini. Giulia was mother of Laura Orsini, born in 1492, probably daughter of Alexander. However, he still loved Vannozza and his children by her. Caring for them proved the determining factor of his whole career. He lavished vast sums on them. Vannozza lived in the Palace of a late Cardinal, or in a large, palatial villa. The children lived between their mother's home and the Papal Palace itself.

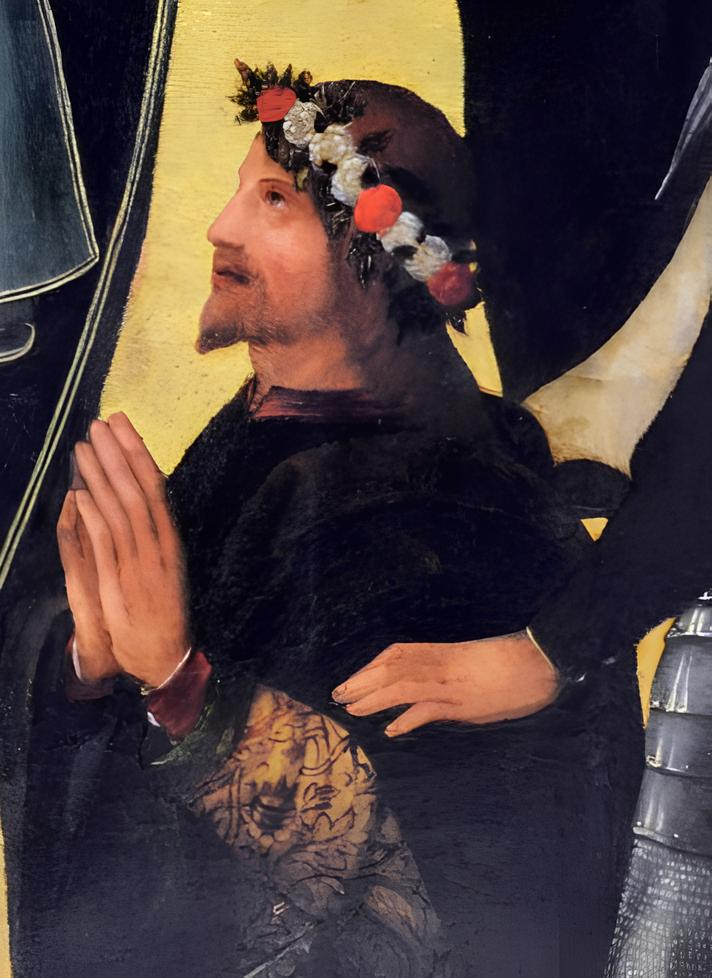
Giovanni Borgia, 2nd Duke of Gandia

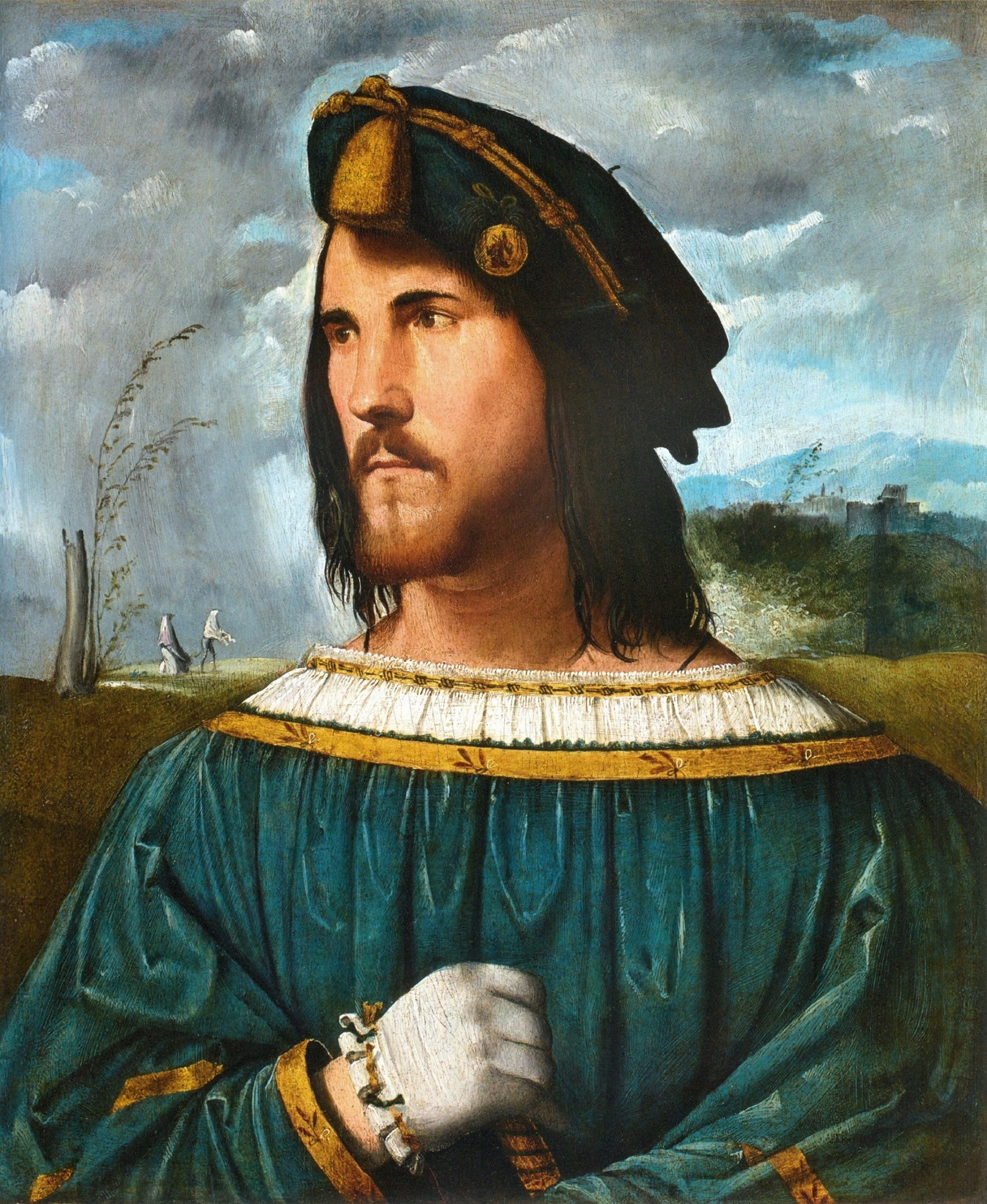
Portrait of a Gentleman (Cesare Borgia)

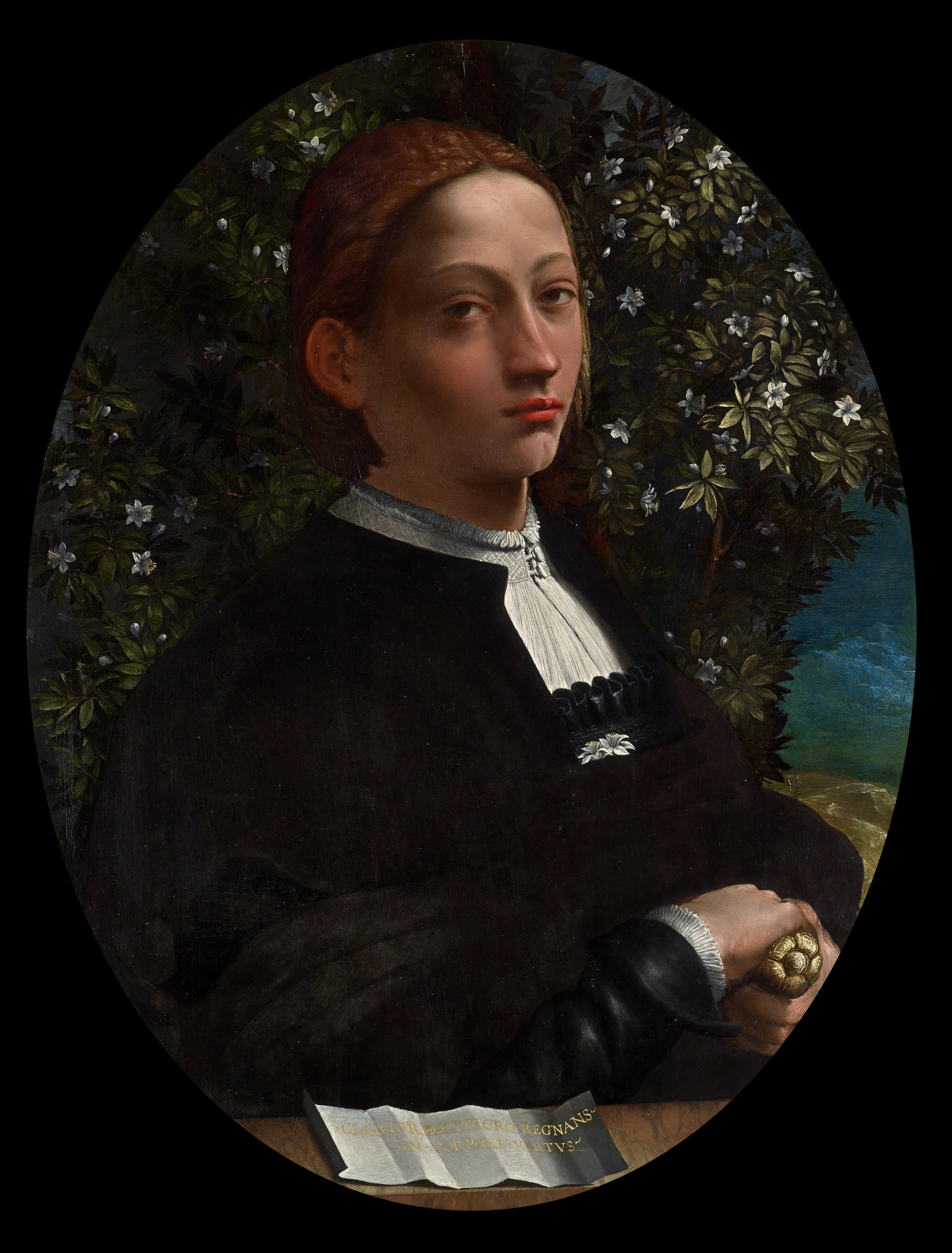
Presumed portrait of Lucrezia Borgia (attributed to Dosso Dossi, c. 1519, National Gallery of Victoria)

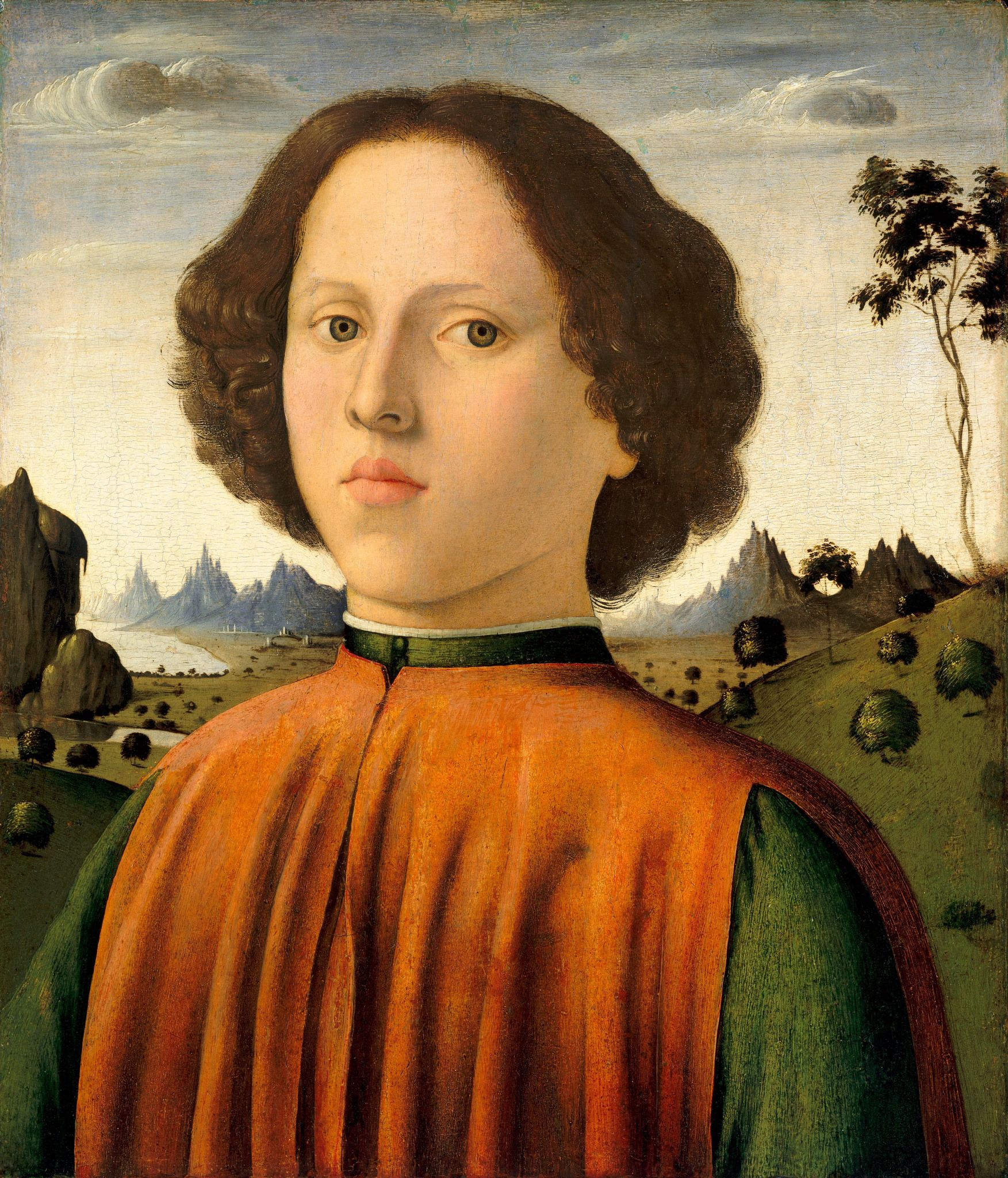
Gioffre Borgia (1482–1517) Prince of Squillace

Six other children, Girolama, Isabella, Pedro-Luiz, Giovanni the "Infans Romanus", Rodrigo and Bernardo, were of uncertain maternal parentage. His daughter Isabella was the great-great-grandmother of Pope Innocent X, who was therefore descended in a direct line from Alexander.

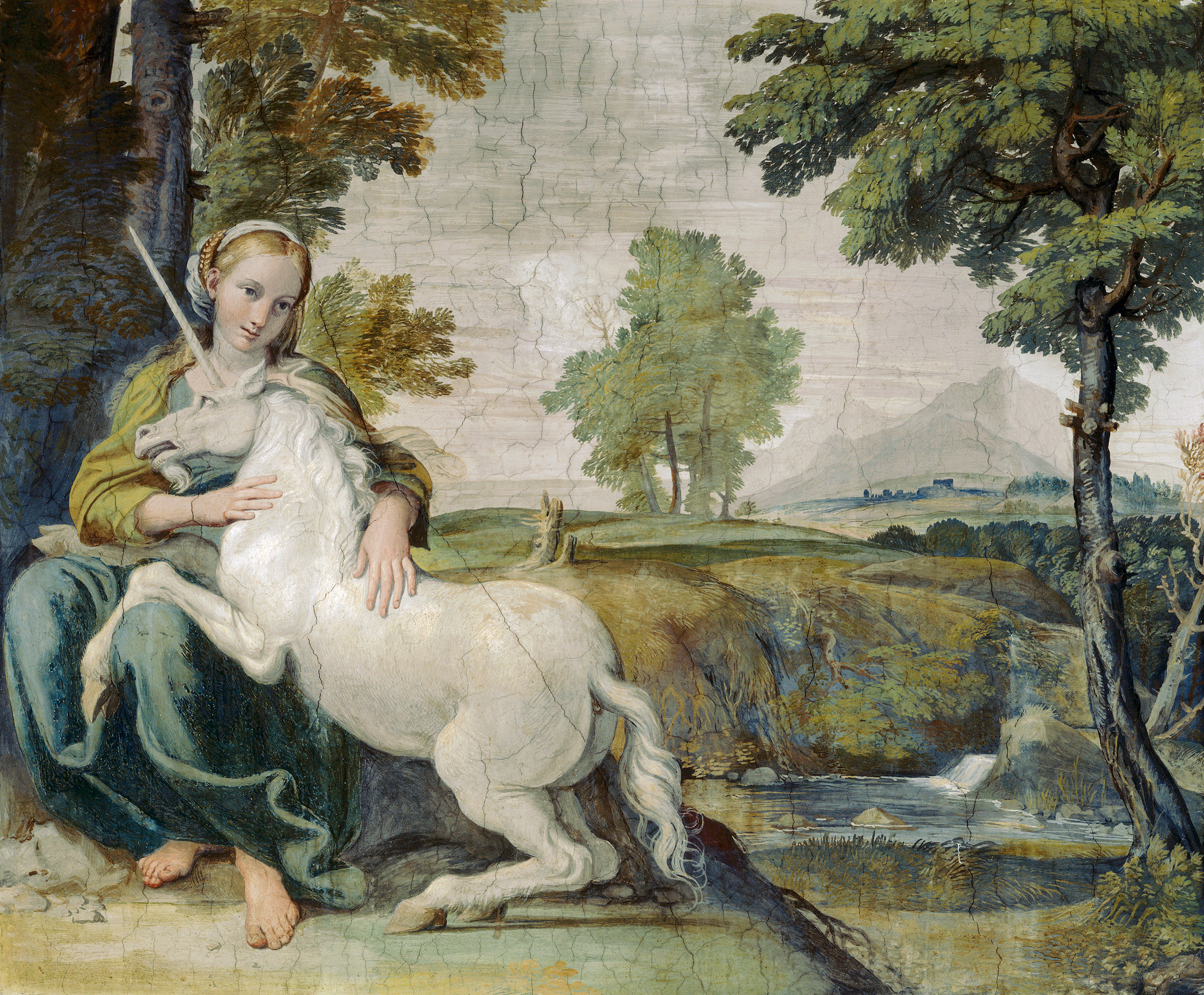
Giulia Farnese as – A Virgin with a Unicorn, by Domenichino, c. 1604–05, from Palazzo Farnese

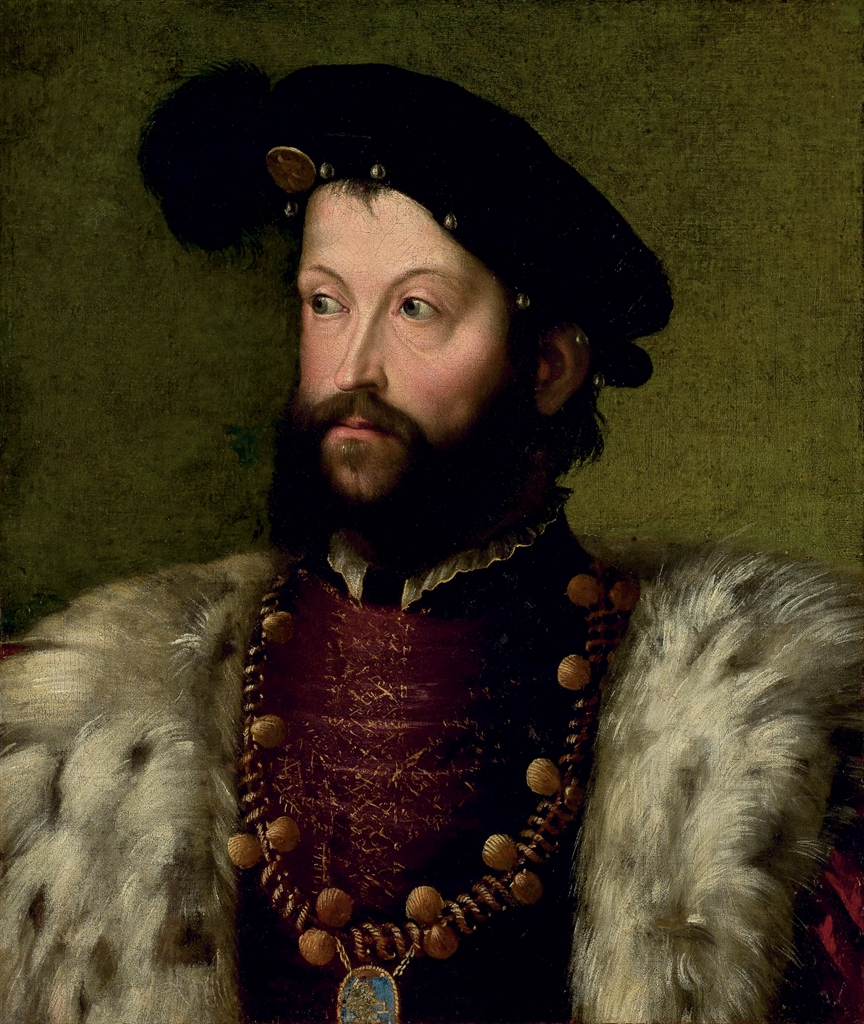
Ercole II d'Este, Duke of Ferrara

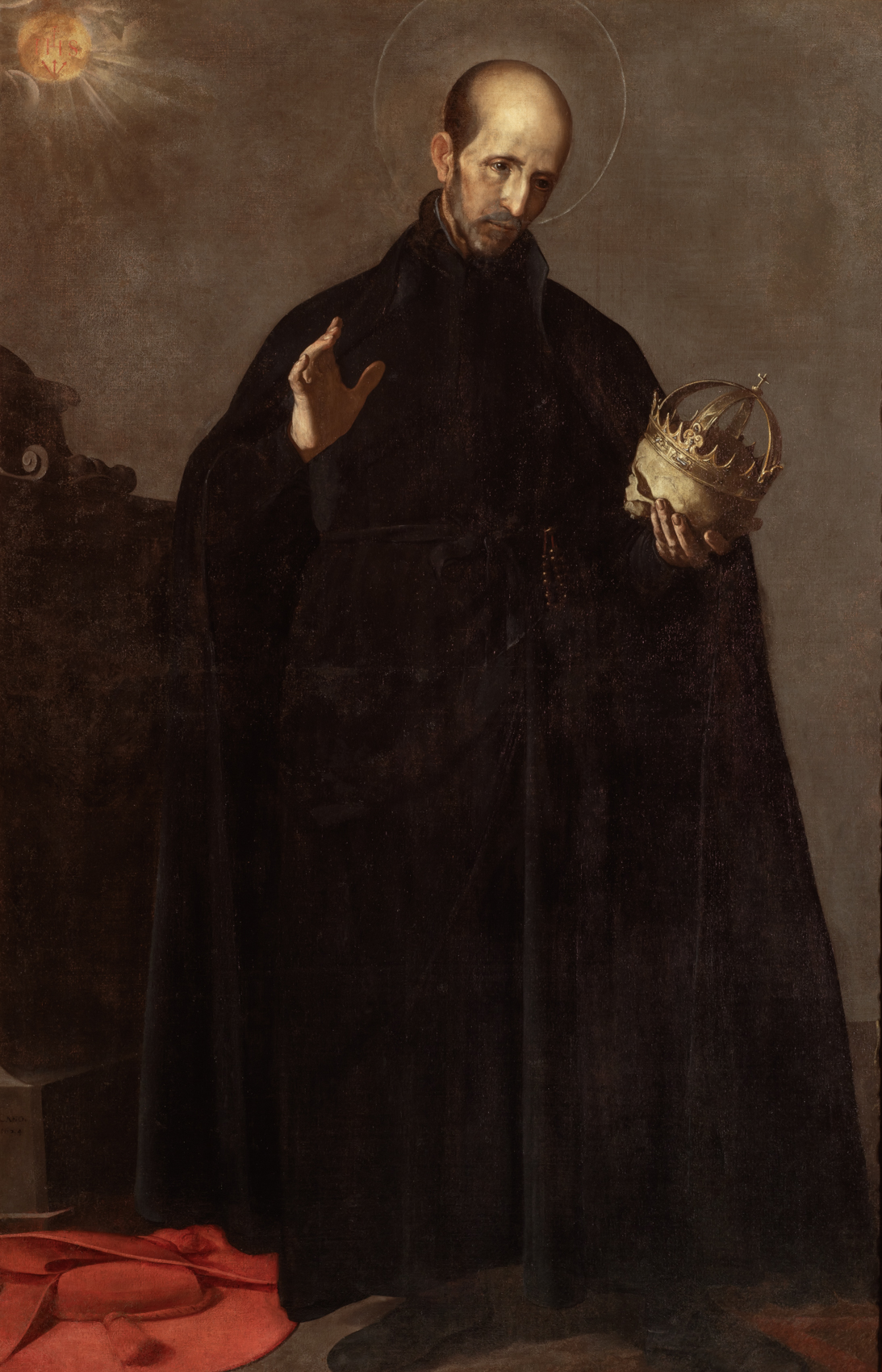
Francis Borgia, 4th Duke of Gandía

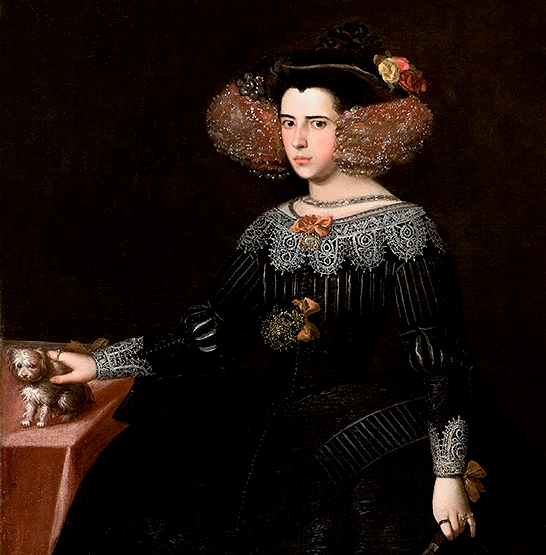
Luisa de Guzmán, Queen consort of Portugal

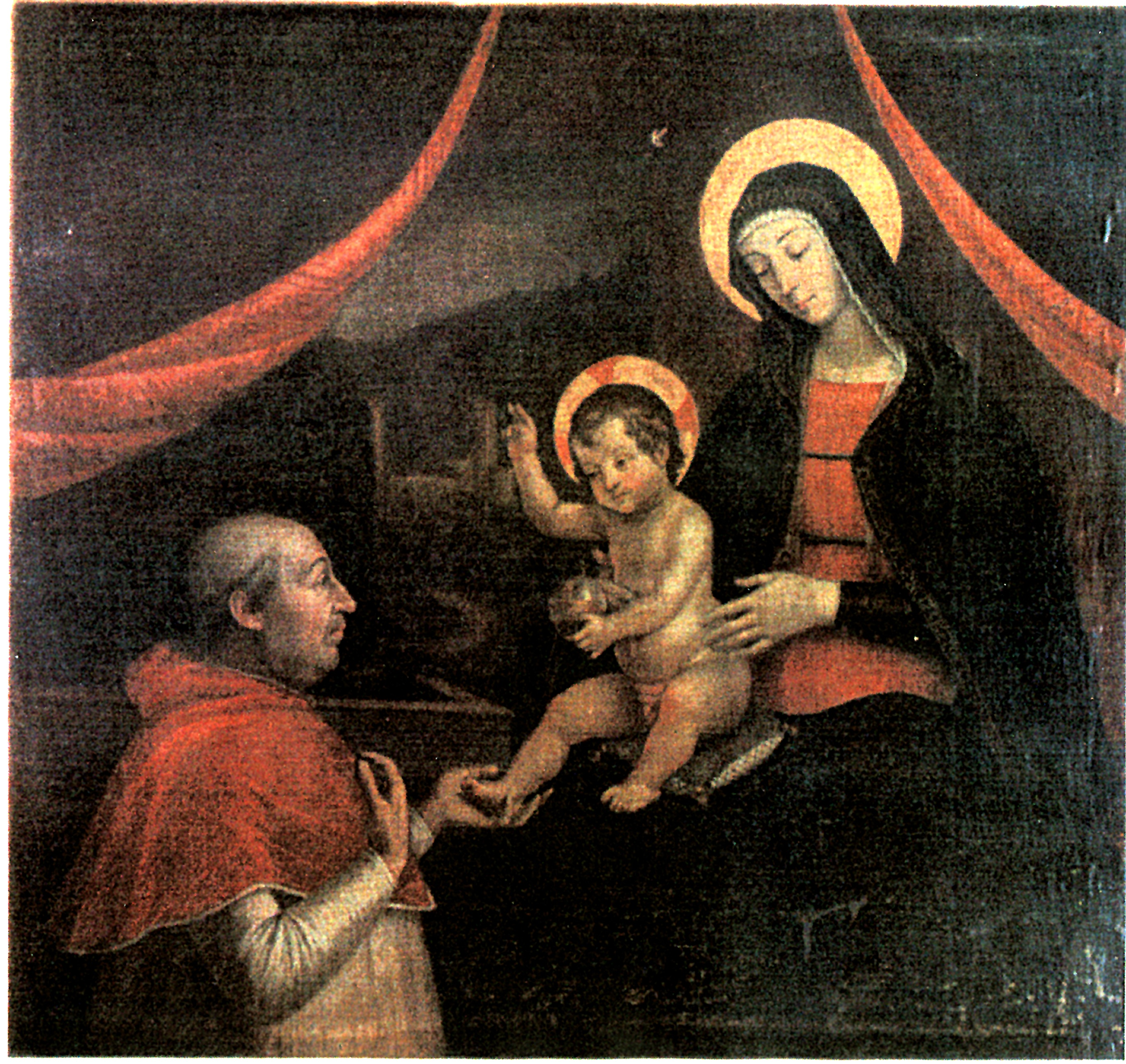
Alexander VI kneeling in front of the Madonna, said to be a likeness of Giulia Farnese (Note: Doubtful, but possible. On a similar claim: "Without any solid evidence Giulia is said to have been the model for Pinturicchio's 'Virgin and Child' surrounded by angels in the Borgia Apartments of the Vatican.")

== Slavery ==
While the explorers of Spain imposed a form of slavery called "encomienda" on the indigenous peoples they met in the New World, some popes had spoken out against the practice of slavery. In 1435, Pope Eugene IV had issued an attack on slavery in the Canary Islands in his papal bull Sicut dudum, which included the excommunication of all those who engaged in the slave trade with native chiefs there. A form of indentured servitude was allowed, being similar to a peasant's duty to his liege lord in Europe.

In the wake of Columbus's landing in the New World, Pope Alexander was asked by the Spanish monarchy to confirm their ownership of these newly found lands. The bulls issued by Pope Alexander VI: Eximiae devotionis (3 May 1493), Inter caetera (4 May 1493), and Dudum siquidem (23 September 1493), granted rights to Spain with respect to the newly discovered lands in the Americas similar to those Pope Nicholas V had previously conferred on Portugal with the bulls Romanus Pontifex and Dum Diversas. Morales Padrón (1979) concludes that these bulls gave power to enslave the natives. Minnich (2010) asserts that this "slave trade" was permitted to facilitate conversions to Christianity. Other historians and Vatican scholars strongly disagree with these accusations and assert that Alexander never gave his approval to the practice of slavery. Other later popes, such as Pope Paul III in Sublimis Deus (1537), Pope Benedict XIV in Immensa Pastorum (1741), and Pope Gregory XVI in his letter In supremo apostolatus (1839), continued to condemn slavery.

Thornberry (2002) asserts that Inter caetera was applied in the Spanish Requirement of 1513, which was read to American Indians (who could not understand the colonisers' language) before hostilities against them began. They were given the option to accept the authority of the pope and Spanish crown or face being attacked and subjugated. In 1993, the Indigenous Law Institute called on Pope John Paul II to revoke Inter caetera and to make reparation for "this unreasonable historical grief". This was followed by a similar appeal in 1994 by the Parliament of World Religions.

== Last years ==
A danger now arose in the shape of a conspiracy by the deposed despots, the Orsini, and of some of Cesare's own condottieri. At first, the papal troops were defeated and things looked bleak for the house of Borgia. But a promise of French help quickly forced the confederates to come to terms. Cesare, by an act of treachery, then seized the ringleaders at Senigallia and put Oliverotto da Fermo and Vitellozzo Vitelli to death (31 December 1502). When Alexander VI heard the news, he lured Cardinal Orsini to the Vatican and cast him into a dungeon, where he died, rumored to be poisoned on the orders of the pope. His goods were confiscated and many other members of the clan in Rome were arrested, while Alexander's son Goffredo Borgia led an expedition into the Campagna and seized their castles. Thus the two great houses of Orsini and Colonna, who had long fought for predominance in Rome and often flouted the pope's authority, were subjugated and the Borgias' power increased. Cesare then returned to Rome, where his father asked him to assist Goffredo in reducing the last Orsini strongholds; this he was unwilling to do, much to his father's annoyance; but he eventually marched out, captured Ceri and made peace with Giulio Orsini, who surrendered Bracciano.

The war between France and Spain for the possession of Naples dragged on, and the pope was forever intriguing, ready to ally himself with whichever power promised the most advantageous terms at any moment. He offered to help Louis XII on condition that Sicily be given to Cesare, and then offered to help Spain in exchange for Siena, Pisa and Bologna.

== Death ==
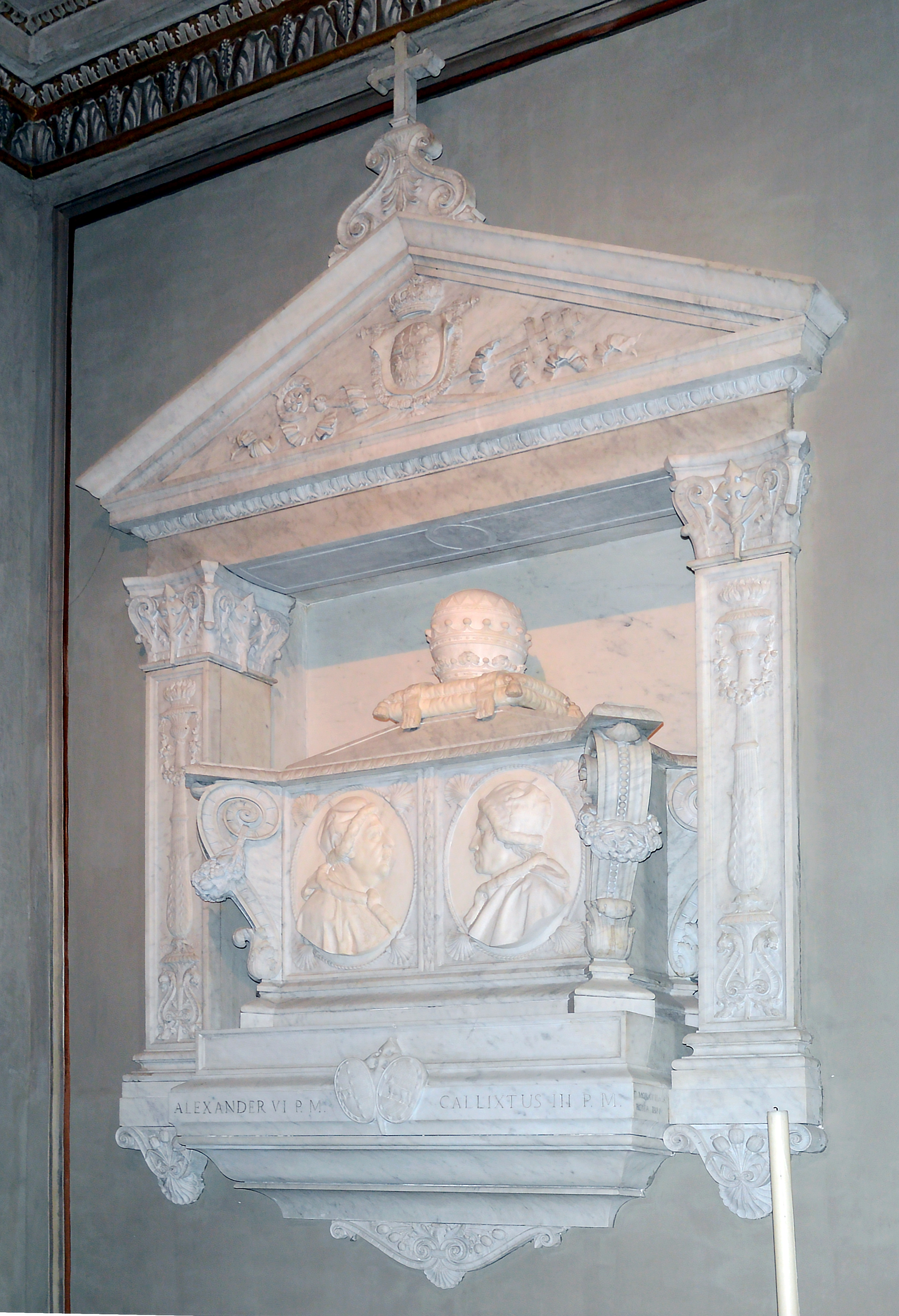
The tomb of Pope Alexander VI and his uncle, Pope Callixtus III

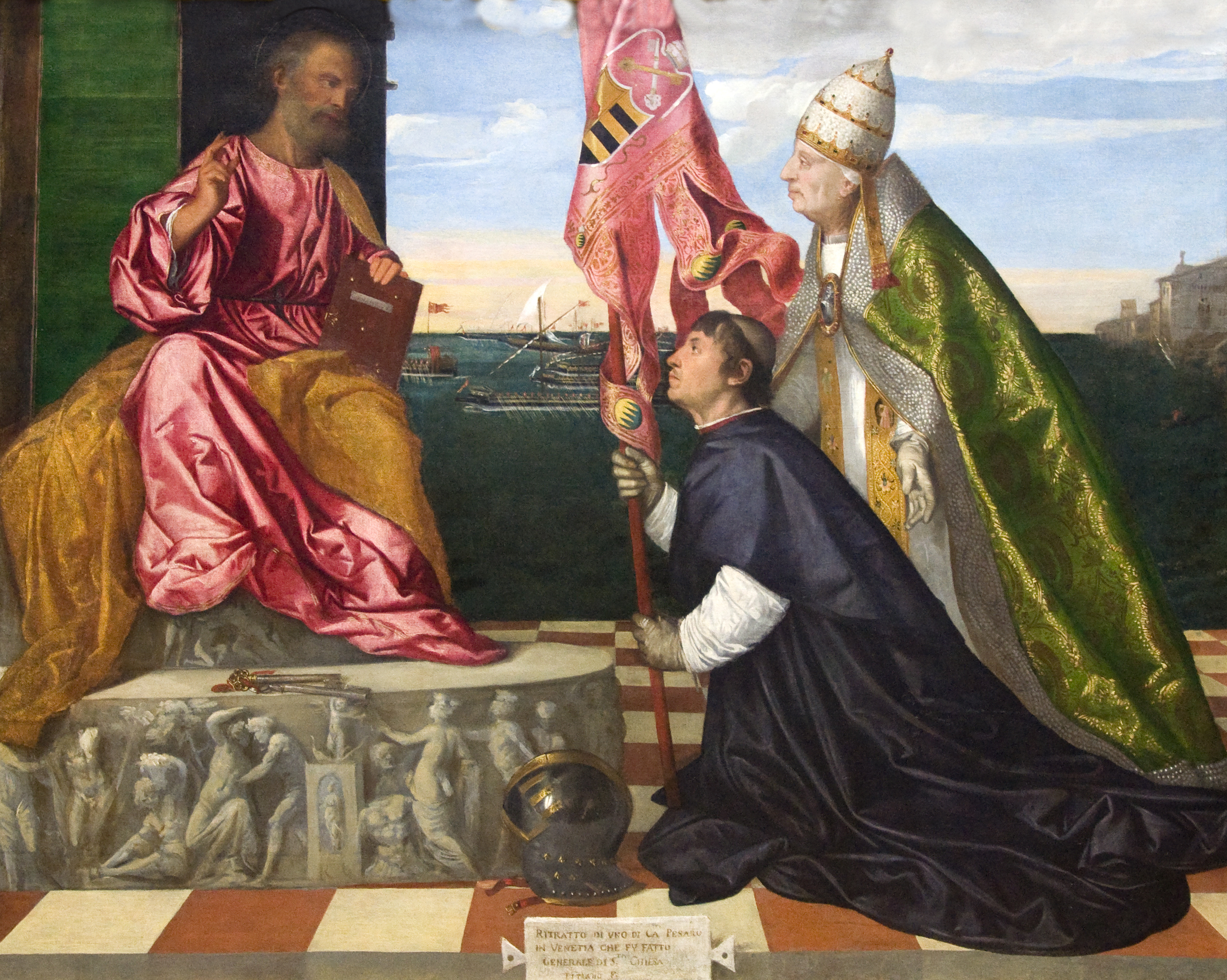
Jacopo Pesaro being presented by Pope Alexander VI to Saint Peter, painting by Titian

Cesare was preparing for another expedition in August 1503 when, after he and his father had dined with Cardinal Adriano Castellesi on 6 August, they were taken ill with fever a few days later. Cesare, who "lay in bed, his skin peeling and his face suffused to a violet colour" as a consequence of certain drastic measures to save him, eventually recovered; but the aged Pontiff apparently had little chance. Burchard's Diary provides a few details of the pope's final illness and death at age 72:

Saturday, 12 August 1503, the pope fell ill in the morning. After the hour of vespers, between six and seven o'clock a fever appeared and remained permanently. On 15 August thirteen ounces of blood were drawn from him and the tertian ague supervened. On Thursday, 17 August, at nine o'clock in the forenoon he took medicine. On Friday, the 18th, between nine and ten o'clock he confessed to the Bishop Gamboa of Carignola, who then read Mass to him. After his Communion he gave the Eucharist to the pope who was sitting in bed. Then he ended the Mass at which were present five cardinals, Serra, Juan and Francesco Borgia, Casanova and Loris. The pope told them that he felt very bad. At the hour of vespers after Gamboa had given him Extreme Unction, he died.

As for his true faults, known only to his confessor, Pope Alexander VI apparently died genuinely repentant. (Note: "[T]here is every reason to believe," writes the Dublin Review, that Pope Alexander VI died "in sentiments of piety and devotion.") The bishop of Gallipoli, Alexis Celadoni, spoke of the pontiff's contrition during his funeral oration (Note: The historical value of Bishop Celadoni's funeral oration is said to be immense: "On 16 Sept 1503 Burchardus records in his diary that Alexius Celadenus or Celadonius, bishop of Gallipoli, delivered a discourse to the cardinals about to enter into conclave for the election of a successor to Pope Alexander VI. Et fuit tediosa et longa oratio. Burchardus's most recent editor, Thuasne, states that this oration exists in manuscript in the Bibliothèque Nationale ... He omits to observe that, granting that the discourse may have been too long for the cardinals, the longer the better for us, inasmuch as it contains an account of Pope Alexander of almost unique value, not merely as the judgment of a contemporary, but as delivered in public before an audience of contemporaries whose station in the church had brought them into almost daily intercourse with the deceased pope, and before whom any serious misrepresentation would have been impossible ...") to the electors of Alexander's successor, Pope Pius III: (Note: Latin text: "Dum graviter aegrotaret, factorum conscientia punctus contrito dolentique animo ad lachrymas ut audio fusus, sacrosanctum communionis corpus sua sponte, dilutis prius diligentissima confessione peccatis, petierit, et alia sacramenta ...")

When at last the pope was suffering from a very severe sickness, he spontaneously requested, one after another, each of the last sacraments. He first made a very careful confession of his sins, with a contrite heart, and was affected even to the shedding of tears, I am told; then he received in Communion the most Sacred Body and Extreme Unction was administered to him.

The interregnum witnessed again the ancient "tradition" of violence and rioting. (Note: "Throughout the Middle Ages a 'tradition' or 'custom' involving pillaging was attached to the death and election of high-ranking prelates." And as early as 633, "the Fourth Council of Toledo condemned the violence of the interregnum." Nor were the Romans alone guilty of such misbehavior. In the eleventh century, Peter Damian, writing to the clergy and people of Osimo, sharply reproved the "perverse and wholly detestable practice of certain people, who at the death of the bishop break in like enemies and rob his house, like thieves make off with his belongings, set fire to the homes on his estate, and with fierce and savage barbarity cut down his grape vines and orchards".) Cesare, too ill to attend to the business himself, sent Don Micheletto, his chief bravo, to seize the pope's treasures before the death was publicly announced. The next day the body was exhibited to the people and clergy of Rome, but was covered by an "old tapestry" ("antiquo tapete"), having become greatly disfigured by rapid decomposition. According to Raphael Volterrano: "It was a revolting scene to look at that deformed, blackened corpse, prodigiously swelled, and exhaling an infectious smell; his lips and nose were covered with brown drivel, his mouth was opened very widely, and his tongue, inflated by poison ... therefore no fanatic or devotee dared to kiss his feet or hands, as custom would have required." The Venetian ambassador stated that the body was "the ugliest, most monstrous and horrible dead body that was ever seen, without any form or likeness of humanity". Ludwig von Pastor insists that the decomposition was "perfectly natural", owing to the summer heat. (Note: "In consequence of the simultaneous illness of both the Pope and his son, and the rapid decomposition of the body, which, considering the heat of the weather, was perfectly natural, the cry of poison was raised at once; but on 19 August the Mantuan Envoy writes that there was no sort of ground for supposing this.")

Commentaries attribute the pope's death to malaria, then prevalent in Rome, or to another such pestilence. One contemporary official wrote home that there was little surprise that Alexander and Cesare had both fallen ill, as the bad air had led to many in Rome, and especially in the Roman Curia, becoming sick.

After a short stay, the body was removed from the crypts of St Peter's and installed in the lesser known Spanish national church of Santa Maria in Monserrato degli Spagnoli.

== Legacy ==
A Glass of Wine with Caesar Borgia (1893) by John Collier. From left: Cesare Borgia, Lucrezia Borgia, Pope Alexander VI, and a young man holding an empty glass. The painting represents the popular view of the treacherous nature of the Borgias—the implication being that the young man cannot be sure that the wine is not poisoned.

Detail of fresco Resurrection in the Borgia Apartments, showing Alexander VI humbly in prayer

Following the death of Alexander VI, his rival and successor Julius II said on the day of his election: "I will not live in the same rooms as the Borgias lived. He desecrated the Holy Church as none before." The Borgia Apartments remained sealed until the 19th century.

Catholic apologists of Alexander VI have argued that the behaviors he receives criticism for were not atypical of the period. De Maistre, in his work Du Pape, "The latter are forgiven nothing, because everything is expected from them, wherefore the vices lightly passed over in a Louis XIV become most offensive and scandalous in an Alexander VI."

Alexander VI had sought reforms of the increasingly irresponsible Curia, putting together a group of his most pious cardinals in order to move the process along. The planned reforms included new rules on the sale of Church property, the limiting of cardinals to one diocese, and stricter moral codes for clergy, though these were not implemented. (Note: "As part of his proposed new reforms, Alexander now nominated a commission of six of the most pious cardinals, and less than two months later a draft Bull of Reformation had been prepared. The pope was banned from selling benefices and from transferring Church property to laypersons. As for the cardinals, who were to be drawn from all the nations, none should possess more than one bishopric; their households were limited to eighty people and thirty horses; they were banned from hunting, theaters, carnivals, and tournaments; and their funeral expenses were not to exceed 1,500 ducats. The lesser clergy were similarly reined in: they must refuse all bribes and put away their concubines.")

Alexander VI was known for his patronage of the arts, and in his days a new architectural era was initiated in Rome with the coming of Bramante. Raphael, Michelangelo, and Pinturicchio all worked for him. He commissioned Pinturicchio to lavishly paint a suite of rooms in the Apostolic Palace in the Vatican, which are today known as the Borgia Apartments. He took a great interest in theatrics, and he even had Plautus's Menaechmi performed in his apartments.

In addition to the arts, Alexander VI also encouraged the development of education. In 1495, he issued a papal bull at the request of William Elphinstone, Bishop of Aberdeen, and James IV of Scotland, founding King's College, Aberdeen. King's College now forms an integral element of the University of Aberdeen. Alexander VI also, in 1501, approved the University of Valencia.

Alexander VI, whom papal rival and successor Giuliano della Rovere alleged without evidence was a marrano, demonstrated relatively benign treatment of Jews. After the 1492 expulsion of the Jews from Spain, some 9,000 impoverished Iberian Jews arrived at the borders of the Papal States. Alexander welcomed them into Rome, declaring that they were "permitted to lead their life, free from interference from Christians, to continue in their own rites, to gain wealth, and to enjoy many other privileges". He similarly allowed the immigration of Jews expelled from Portugal in 1497 and from Provence in 1498.

Bohuslav Hasištejnský z Lobkovic, a Bohemian humanist poet (1461–1510), wrote a hostile epitaph on Alexander in Latin:

Epitaphium Alexandri Papae

Cui tranquilla quies odio, cui proelia cordi
et rixa et caedes seditioque fuit,
mortuus hac recubat populis gaudentibus urna
pastor Alexander, maxima Roma, tuus.
Vos, Erebi proceres, vos caeli claudite portas
atque Animam vestris hanc prohibete locis.
In Styga nam veniens pacem turbabit Averni,
committet superos, si petat astra, poli.

Translation:

Epitaph to Pope Alexander

One who hated peace and quiet,
and who loved battles, strife, murder, and treason,
Lies in this urn as all peoples rejoice,
Alexander, thy shepherd, o greatest Rome.
Ye prelates of Erebus, close the doors of Heaven
and prohibit this Soul from your realm.
If it enters Styx, it will disrupt the peace of Avernus,
and if it seeks heaven it will set the inhabitants of the sky against each other.

Despite Julius II's hostility, the Roman barons and Romagna vicars were never again to be the same problem for the papacy and Julius' successes owe much to the framework laid by the Borgias. Unlike Julius, Alexander never made war unless absolutely necessary, preferring negotiation and diplomacy.

Alexander Lee argues that the crimes attributed to the Borgias were exaggerated by contemporaries because they were outsiders expanding their holdings at the expense of the Italians, that they were Spaniards when it was felt that Spain had too much control on the Italian peninsula, and that after the death of Alexander the family lost its influence and therefore any incentive for anyone to defend them.

On the other hand, two of Alexander's successors, Sixtus V and Urban VIII, described him as one of the most outstanding popes since Saint Peter.

== See also ==
- Banquet of Chestnuts
- Birthplace of Pope Alexander VI
- Cardinals created by Alexander VI
- List of popes from the Borgia family
- List of sexually active popes
- Route of the Borgias
- Spanish Empire

== Notes ==
Catholic Church titles
Preceded by Innocent VIII	Pope; 11 August 1492 – 18 August 1503	Succeeded by Pius III
