= Rodrigo Gil de Borja y Fennolet =

Valencian noble

Roderic Gil de Borja i Fennolet was a Valencian noble from Xàtiva, Kingdom of Valencia, with origins in the town of Borja, Zaragoza. He held the title of the Jurat de l'Estament Militar de Xàtiva in 1395, 1406 and 1407 respectively, a title that had been held by many previous generations of this branch of the Borja family based on Ventres street in Xàtiva. This same branch, of which Rodrigo Gil was the Head of House, would later go on to become the Borgia family in Italy.

== Biography ==
The birth date of Rodrigo Gil de Borja y Fennolet is unknown, although he is known to have lived in Xàtiva. He was the only son of Rodrigo de Borja and his first wife Sabina Anglesola, though he also lived with his stepmother whose last name he inherited, Francesca de Fenollet (d. 1375), apparently after the death of his mother. His paternal grandfather was Gonzalo Gil de Borja, who, like Rodrigo Gil, served as Jurado del Estamento Militar de Xàtiva in 1340. Neither of his maternal grandparents are known. His paternal ancestor, Rodrigo de Borja, the presumed founder of their house, participated in the Conquest of Orihuela in 1272.

== Marriage and Descendants ==
Rodrigo Gil de Borja y Fennolet married Sibilia de Escrivà y Pròixita, also of Xàtiva, who died in 1409. She was the daughter of Andreu Guillem Escrivà i Pallarès, the Señor de Agres and Señor de Betrillent who died in 1397, and his wife, Sibilia de Pròixita. The couple had six children:

- Jofré de Borja y Escrivà (whose son would go on to become Pope Alexander VI)
- Gil de Borja y Escrivà
- Joan de Borja y Escrivà
- Rodrigo de Borja y Escrivà
- Galceran de Borja y Escrivà
- Joana de Borja y Escrivà
