= Juan Domingo de Borja =

Father of Pope Callixtus III

Juan Domingo de Borja y Doncel (c. 1357 – ?) was the father of Pope Callixtus III. He held the title over the Barony La Torre de Canals. He was a member of the House of Borja. He was born in the Spanish village of the same name, Borja.

== Biography ==
Domènec made his fortune in Xàtiva, where he was involved in local commerce, specifically in the sugar trade. He was the son of Domènec I de Borja and Caterina whose family name is not known.

On 2 February 1375, Domènec de Borja, believed to be the father of Callixtus III, testified in a document as a citizen of Xàtiva.

In 1404, Domènec was recorded as having been granted the title of Sobreguarda of the frontiers of the Kingdom of Castile by King Martin of Aragon

In 1408, Domènec's son, Alfons de Borja i Cavanilles (future Pope Callixtus III), granted his father the power to collect the pension of a censor in Vall de Pego.

== Marriage and descendants ==
Domènec de Borja married Francina Llançol, of Valencia, and the couple had one boy and four girls:

- Alfons de Borja i Cavanilles, who later became the first Borgia pope.
- Isabel de Borja i Cavanilles, who later married her distant cousin, Jofré de Borja i Doms (also referred to as Jofré Llançol i Escrivà), and was mother to the infamous Pope Alexander VI.
- Catalina de Borja i Cavanilles, who married Joan del Milà, the duke of Massalavés. They had three children:
  - Pere del Milà.
  - Damiata del Milà.
  - Lluís-Joan del Milà i de Borja, who became a cardinal.
- Francesca de Borja i Cavanilles.
- Joana de Borja i Cavanilles, who married Mateu Martí, from Xàtiva, without issue.
