= Luis de Milà y de Borja =

Spanish cardinal

- Cardinal-Priest of Santi Quattro Coronati
- Church: Catholic Church
- See: Santi Quattro Coronati
- In office: 17 September 1456 – 10 September 1507
- Predecessor: Alfonso de Borgia
- Successor: Lorenzo Pucci
- Other post: Bishop of Lleida (1459-1507)
- Previous post: Bishop of Segorbe-Albarracin (1453-1459)

Personal details
- Born: 1432 Jàtiva, Kingdom of Valencia, Crown of Aragon
- Died: 10 September 1507 (aged 74–75) Bélgida, Kingdom of Valencia, Crown of Aragon

Luis Julian de Milà y de Borja (1432 Xàtiva, Kingdom of Valencia, Crown of Aragon – 1510 Bèlgida, Kingdom of Valencia, Crown of Aragon) was a cardinal of the Catholic Church.

His parents were Juan de Milà and Catalina de Borja, daughter of Juan Domingo de Borja y Doncel. He was named cardinal on 17 September 1456 by his uncle, the Pope Callixtus III de Borja. He served as administrator and bishop of Segorbe (1453-1459) and Lérida (1461-1509).

== See also ==
- Papal conclave, 1458
- Palace of Milà i Aragó
