= Eleanora (name) =

Variant of the name Eleanor

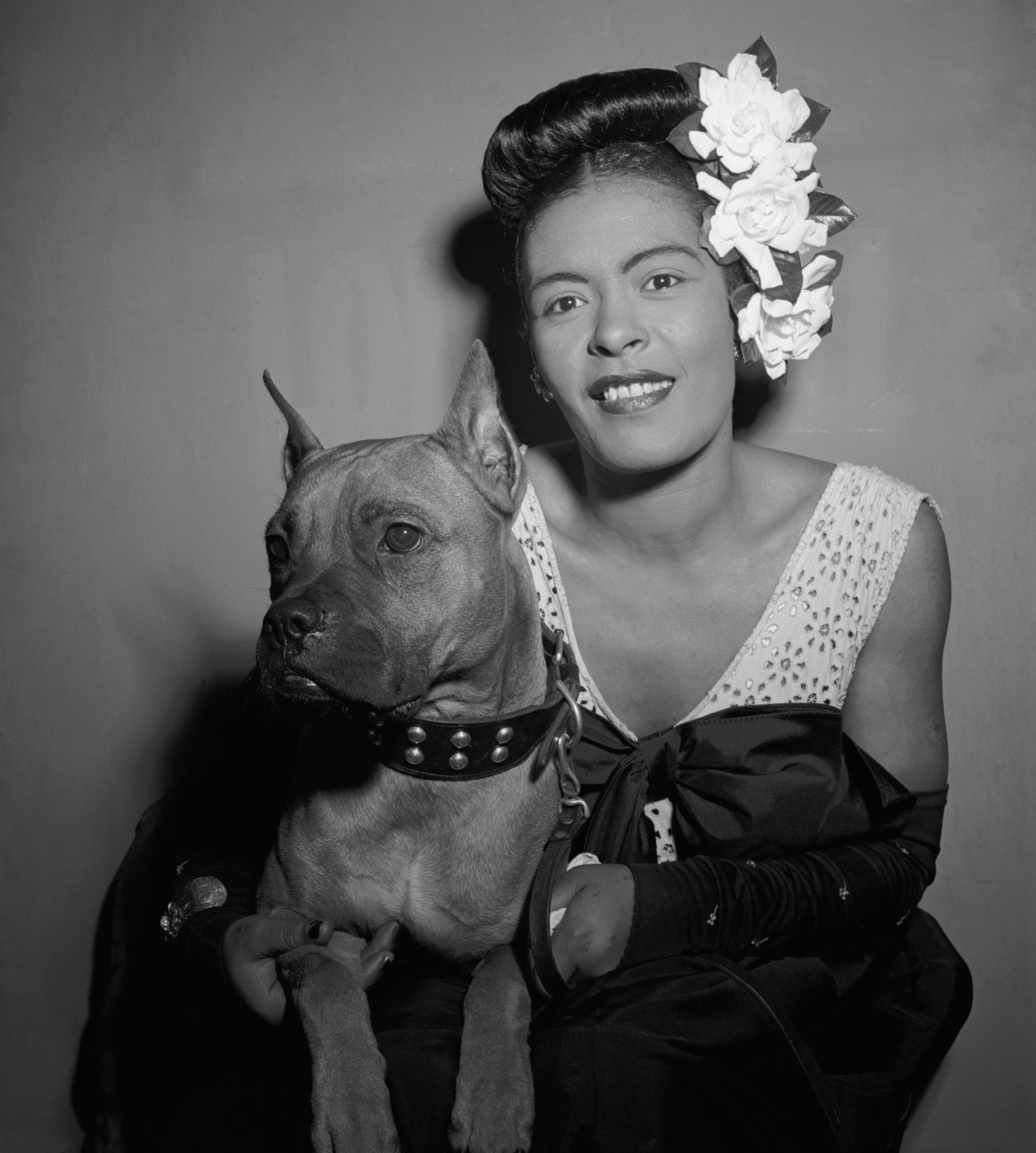
- Billie Holiday is the stage name of American jazz singer Eleanora Fagan
- Gender: Female
- Language: Italian, Swedish

Origin
- Origin: Greek

Other names
- Variant form: Eleonora
- Related names: Eleanor

Eleanora or Eleonora is a female given name, a variant of the name Eleanor.

Notable people with the name include:

- Countess Palatine Eleonora Catherine of Zweibrücken (1626–1692), Swedish princess
- Eleonora Luisa Gonzaga (1686–1741), Duchess of Rovere and Montefeltro as the wife of Francesco Maria de' Medici
- Eleonora, Princess of Ligne (born 1953), wife of Michel, 14th Prince of Ligne
- Eleonora Abbagnato (born 1978), Italian ballet dancer
- Eleonora Aguiari, Italian installation artist and author
- Eleonora Alverà (born 1982), Italian curler
- Eleonora Alvisi (born 2003), Italian tennis player
- Eleonora Archaia (born 1967), Georgian politician
- Eleanora Armitage (1865–1961), British botanist and writer
- Eleanora Atherton (1782–1870), English philanthropist
- Eleonora Bargili, Italian artist
- Eleonora Bechis (born 1974), Italian politician
- Eleonora Bentivoglio, Italian ruler
- Eleonora Bergman (born 1947), Polish architecture historian
- Eleonora Berlanda (born 1976), Italian middle distance runner
- Eleonora Bilotta, Italian complex systems researcher
- Eleonora Brigliadori (born 1960), Italian model, actress and television personality
- Eleanora Brown (born 1947), Italian film actress
- Eleonora Bruzual, Venezuelan writer
- Eleonora Buratto, Italian operatic soprano
- Eleonora Carrillo, Salvadoran model
- Eleanora Carus-Wilson (1897–1977), British economic historian
- Eleonora Cassano (born 1965), Argentine ballet dancer and teacher
- Eleonora Catsigeras, Uruguayan mathematician
- Eleonora Cecchini (born 2003), Sammarinese football player
- Eleonora Chiavarelli (1915–2010), wife of murdered Italian politician Aldo Moro
- Eleonora Ciabocco (born 2004), Italian cyclist
- Eleonora de Cisneros (1878–1934), American opera singer
- Eleonora Cortini (born 1992), Italian showgirl, model, actress and television presenter
- Eleonora Cybo (1523–1594), Italian noblewoman and writer
- Eleonora Czartoryska (1710–1795), Polish magnate
- Eleonora Daniele (born 1976), Italian actress and television presenter
- Eleonora Davtyan (born 1992), Armenian professional footballer
- Eleonora De Angelis (born 1967), Italian voice actress
- Eleonora De Paolis (born 1986), Italian canoeist
- Eleonora Di Nezza, Italian mathematician
- Eleonora Dimakos, Canadian actor, model and journalist
- Eleonora Dominici (born 1996), Italian racewalker
- Eleonora Rossi Drago (1925–2007), Italian actress
- Eleonora Duse (1858–1924), Italian actress, often known simply as Duse
- Eleonora Dziękiewicz (born 1978), Polish volleyball player
- Eleonora Ehrenbergová (1832–1912), Czech operatic soprano
- Eleonora von Essen (born 1978), Swedish food writer and cookbook author
- Eleonora Evi (born 1983), Italian politician
- Eleanora Fagan (1915–1959), birth name of American jazz singer Billie Holiday
- Eleonora Fersino (born 2000), Italian volleyball player
- Eleanora Fleury, Irish psychiatrist and early medical graduate
- Eleonora Forenza (born 1976), Italian politician
- Eleonora Gabrielian (born 1929), Armenian botanist
- Eleonora Gaggero (born 2001), Italian actress and writer
- Eleonora Gasparrini (born 2002), Italian cyclist
- Eleonora Giorgi (1953–2025), Italian actress
- Eleonora Giorgi (race walker) (born 1989), Italian racewalker
- Eleonora Goldoni (born 1996), Italian footballer
- Eleonora Gonzaga, several people
- Eleonora Jenko Groyer (1879–1959), Slovene politician
- Eleonora Hiltl (1905–1979), Austrian politician
- Eleonora Hostasch (born 1944), Austrian politician and trade union leader
- Eleonora Kaminskaitė (1951–1986), Lithuanian rower
- Eleonora Kezhova (born 1985), Bulgarian rhythmic gymnast
- Eleanora Kennedy (fl. 1990's–2020's), American business woman, activist, and Ireland-based racehorse owner
- Eleanora Knopf (1883–1974), American geologist
- Eleonora Kodele (born 1998), Slovenian handball player
- Eleonora Kruger, Romanov impostor
- Eleonora Lo Bianco (born 1979), Italian volleyball player
- Eleonora Marchiando (born 1997), Italian sprinter
- Eleonora Masalab (born 1988), Ukrainian beauty pageant contestant
- Eleonora Meleti (born 1978), Greek journalist
- Eleonora de Mendonça (born 1948), Brazilian long distance runner
- Eleonora Mihalca, Romanian table tennis player
- Eleonora Milusheva (born 1973), Bulgarian high jumper
- Eleonora Mitrofanova (born 1953), Russian politician and diplomat
- Eléonora Molinaro (born 2000), Luxembourgish tennis player
- Eleonora Monti, Italian painter
- Eleonora Oliva (born 1998), Italian footballer
- Eleonora Patacchini, American economist
- Eleonora Patuzzo (born 1989), Italian cyclist
- Eleonora Pedron (born 1982), Italian model and actress
- Eleonora Piacezzi (born 1995), Italian footballer
- Eleonora Requena, Venezuelan poet
- Eleonora Romanova (born 1998), Ukrainian-Russian rhythmic gymnast
- Eleonora Säfström (1770–1857), Swedish opera singer
- Eleonora Schmitt (born 1931), Brazilian swimmer
- Eleonora Sears (1881–1968), American tennis player
- Eleonora Mildred Sidgwick (1845–1936), British psychic researcher
- Eleonora Soldo (born 1984), Italian cyclist
- Eleanora E. Tate, American author and educator
- Eleonora Trivella (born 1990), Italian female rower
- Eleonora Troja, Italian astrophysicist
- Eleonora Tscherning (1817–1890), Danish painter
- Eleonora Vallone (born 1953), Italian actress, model and television personality
- Eleonora Vandi (born 1996), Italian middle-distance runner
- Eleonora Vargas, Italian film actress
- Eleonora Vegliante (born 1973), Venezuelan tennis player
- Eleonora Verbeke, Belgian nun and apothecary
- Eleonora Vild (born 1969), Serbian basketball player
- Eleonora Vindau (born 1986), Ukrainian soprano opera singer
- Eleonora Vinnichenko (born 1993), Ukrainian figure skater
- Eleonora Vinogradova (1931–2003), Ukrainian music educator and choir director
- Eleonora Wexler (born 1974), Argentine actress
- Eleonora Ziemięcka (1819–1869), Polish philosopher and publicist
- Eleonora Zouganeli (born 1983), Greek singer
- Ulrika Eleonora of Sweden (1688–1741), Queen of Sweden

== See also ==
- Eleanora (disambiguation)
