= Angela Borgia =

Italian noblewoman (c.1486-c.1521)

- Lady of Sassuolo
- Full name: Angela Borgia or Angela de Borja
- Born: c. 1486; Rome, Italy
- Died: c. 1520–1522; Sassuolo, Italy
- Noble family: Borgia
- Spouses: Alessandro Pio of Savoia, lord of Sassuolo
- Issue: Son (natural); Gilbert II of Savoia; Camilla Alessandra; Eleonora
- Father: Guillem-Ramón de Borja y Sanoguera
- Mother: Isabel de Montcada

Angela Borgia or Borja (born in Rome c. 1486; Died in Sassuolo c. 1520–1522), was an Italian noblewoman.

== Family ==
Angela was the illegitimate daughter of Guillem Ramon de Borja and Sanoguera (who was in Rome in the service of Pope Alexander VI, died in 1503), son of Otic de Borja y Montcada and his wife Violant Sanoguera. Otic was son of Escrivà Galceran de Borja and his wife Isabel de Moncada, Moncada Ot daughter of his second wife, Constança Diec. Angela's mother was Isabel de Montcada. She was also a niece of Cardinal Rodrigo Borgia, later Pope Alexander VI.

She is not to be confused with her sister Angela Borgia and Castellverd; born of the marriage by her father with Violant Castellverd Sanç, who married Rodrigo Rois de Corella, becoming the Countess of Cocentaina or with a third figure of the same name (and not last), Angela Borgia and Moncada Llançol and that, too, in 1506 settled its Llançol Lluís married.

== Youth ==
In her youth she lived in Rome alongside her cousin Lucretia Borgia, whom she accompanied to Ferrara when she married Alfonso I d'Este, Duke of Ferrara .

== Appreciation of her beauty ==
She was considered a woman of great beauty and elegance, and was the favorite companion and assistant to her favorite cousin Lucretia. Diomede Guidalotti dedicated two sonnets to her, and Ludovico Ariosto dedicated the last canto of Orlando Furioso to her.

Pietro Bembo idealized her as an "angel that can pray for me." On 1 August 1504, in the dedication of his "Gli asolani" to the duchess Lucrezia Borgia (published in Venice in 1505), refers back to his Angela, indicating that Lucrezia's cousin and maiden is "the dear and gallant Madonna Angela Borgia".

== Lady of discord: the rivalry of her two suitors of the House of Este ==
While in Ferrara serving Lucretia, she attracted the attentions of both Cardinal Ippolito and his illegitimate brother, Giulio. The two men were already estranged from each other due to previous and continuing disagreements, with mutual resentment between them. This situation between them escalated when both fell in love with Angela. The two brothers began competing for her love and affection. The beautiful and very young girl said one day that she preferred Giulio, and went on to state publicly that only the eyes of her favourite were worth more than the whole person of the Cardinal. At this, Ippolito's hatred towards his brother reached its peak.

Several days later, in November 1505, in the fields near the Palace of Belriguardo, the two rivals met. Giulio, to his misfortune, was alone and could do nothing when the Cardinal ordered his vassals to capture him, kill him and put out his eyes in revenge for Angela's statement. The terrible command was not completely carried out, and Giulio survived, but was beaten badly and lost the use of one eye. From that moment on he began to plot the death of Ippolito, and joined forces with another brother, Ferrante, who aspired to usurp the Duke's position. The plot was directed in a disorganized manner and was quickly discovered. All conspirators and allies were sentenced to death, but the death sentences for the two princes themselves were "generously" transmuted into jail for life.

In 1506, the two were imprisoned in the dungeons of the Castle of the East. Ferrante died there. Giulio survived and regained his freedom in 1559, by the grace of Alfonso II. He had lived 81 years, of which fifty-three held captive.

== Marriage and descendants ==
On December 6, 1506, Lucretia Borgia had Angela married off to Alessandro Pio of Savoia, lord of Sassuolo. The wedding took place in Ferrara, with dancing and comedy coinciding with the Carnival. From this marriage the following children were born: Gilbert (1508–1554), who married the illegitimate daughter of Cardinal Ippolito d'Este, Elisabetta. Camilla Alessandra, a nun of the convent of San Bernardino of Ferrara. Eleonora, a nun of the convent of San Bernardino of Ferrara.

The marriage was a shotgun marriage, as, in January 1506, Angela had given birth to an illegitimate son, whose paternity was attributed to her lover Giulio d'Este.

== Death ==
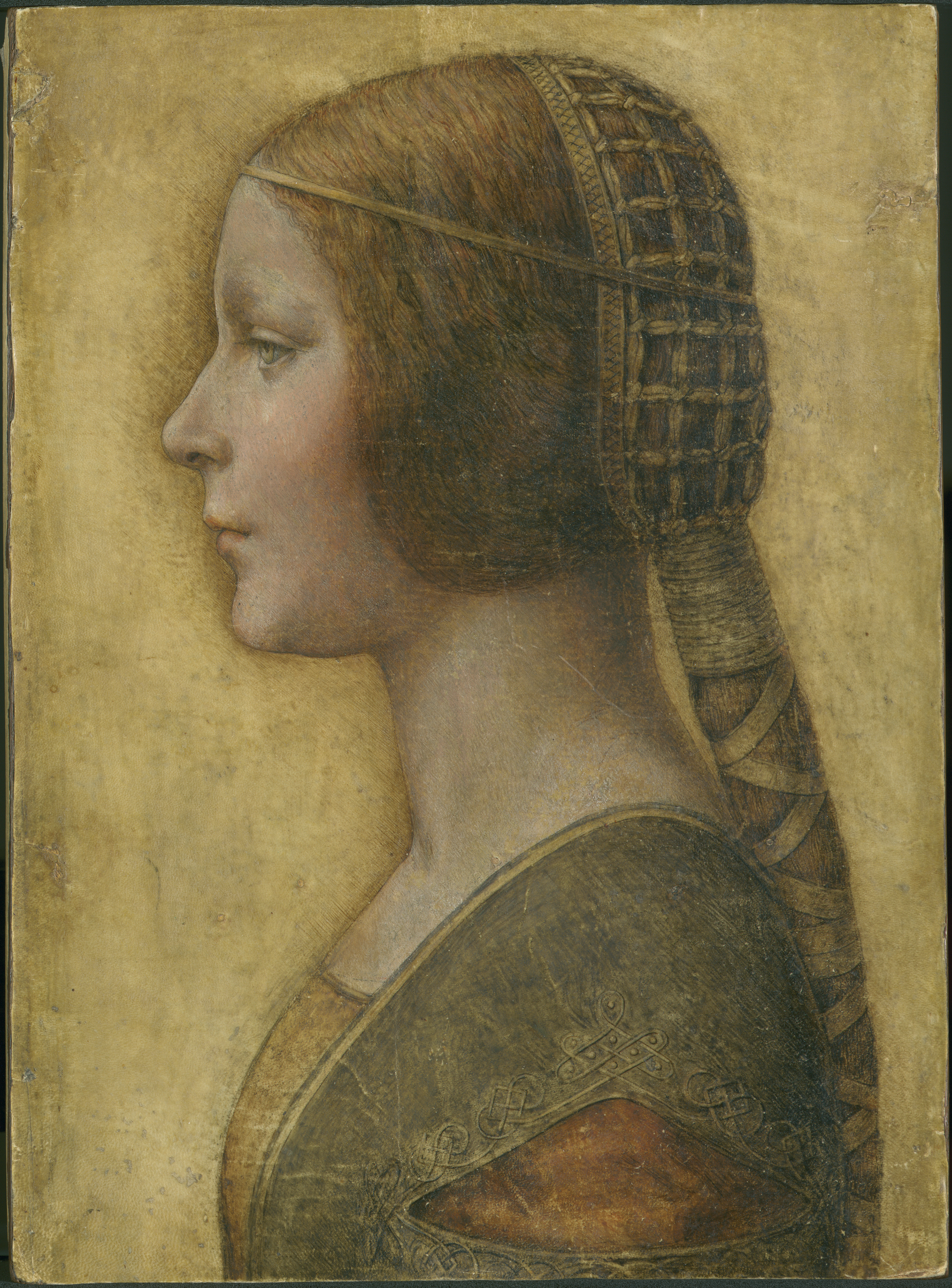
" Young Profile with Renaissance Dress " or " The Beautiful Princess "

According to tradition, his mother Eleonora Bentivoglio, who lived in and ruled the lordship of Sassuolo, was poisoned. She died between 1520–1522, in Sassuolo and was buried in the convent of San José, in the community, with her consort Alexander, died in 1517. By then, Sassuolo was in ruins because of the incessant wars between pro - Papal and pro - French and shifting alliances in which Angela was also involved. In 1537, his eldest son Gilberto, Eleonora still alive, was simple to do and put a plaque in memory of their parents, which currently does not exist, next to the front door of the convent of San José.

== Possible model for a work of Leonardo da Vinci ==
It has been said, by certain experts that the portrait originally known under the title of "Young Profile with Renaissance Dress", initially attributed the authorship of an unknown German painter of the nineteenth century, which recently have also been called "The Beautiful Princess", is actually a creation of the great master Leonardo da Vinci, indicating that the profile, it is appreciated that belongs to Bianca Sforza, the illegitimate daughter of the Duke of Milan, Ludovico Sforza or Ludovico "the Moor" . However, other experts are of the opinion that this is the profile of Angela Borgia.

== Ancestry ==
32. Rodrigo-Gil de Borja
16. Rodrigo Gil de Borja y Fennolet
33. Francesca de Fenollet
8. Galceran de Borja y Escrivá
34. Guillem-Andreu Escrivá; 34. Sibília de Pròixita
17. Sibília Escrivá y de Pròixita
4. Otic de Borja y Montcada
18. Ot de Montcada
9. Isabel de Montcada y Dieç
19. Constaça Dieç
2. Guilem-Ramón de Borja y Sanoguera
5. Violant Sanoguera
1. Angela Borgia (Angela de Borja)
3. Isabel de Montcada

== See also ==
- Castello Estense
