= Bilotta =

Bilotta is an Italian surname. Notable people with the surname include:

- Alessandro Bilotta (born 1977), Italian writer
- Bernardo Bilotta (1843–1918), Italian priest, poet and folklorist
- Eleonora Bilotta (born 1958), Italian complex systems researcher
