= Bruzual (surname) =

Bruzual is a surname. Notable people with the surname include:

- Eleonora Bruzual, Venezuelan writer and journalist
- Manuel Ezequiel Bruzual (1830–1868), Venezuelan military leader and president
