= House of Borgia =

Italo-Spanish Renaissance noble family

Borgia Borja
- Pontifical noble family
- Arms of Borgia family (Or a bull gules upon a terrace vert in a bordure Or charged with eight flames vert.)
- Country: Crown of Aragon; Kingdom of Spain; Kingdom of France; Andorra; Kingdom of Naples; Papal States
- Etymology: From the Spanish town of Borja
- Founded: 1455; 571 years ago
- Founder: Pope Callixtus III (de facto)
- Final ruler: María Ana, 12th Duchess of Gandía
- Titles: Pope (non-hereditary); Co-Prince of Andorra; Duke of Gandía; Gained and lost in 16th century; Prince of Piombino (1501–03); Prince of Squillace (1494–1728); Duke of Urbino (1501–03); Duke of Romagna (1501–53); Duke of Camerino (1501–48); Duke of Valentinois (1498–53); Count of Diois (1498–53)
- Members: Pope Callixtus III; Pope Alexander VI; Giovanni Borgia; Cesare Borgia; Lucrezia Borgia; Francis Borgia
- Distinctions: Supreme Order of Christ; Golden Rose (papacy); Order of Saint Michael
- Traditions: Roman Catholicism
- Dissolution: 1748; 278 years ago

The House of Borgia (/ˈbɔːr(d)ʒə/ BOR-zhə, BOR-jə; Italian: [ˈbɔrdʒa]; Spanish and Aragonese: Borja [ˈboɾxa]; Valencian: Borja [ˈbɔɾdʒa, -dʒɔ]) was a noble family of Spanish origins, which rose to prominence during the Italian Renaissance. They were from Xàtiva, Kingdom of Valencia, the surname being a toponymic from the town of Borja, then in the Crown of Aragon, in Spain.

The Borgias became prominent in ecclesiastical and political affairs in the 15th and 16th centuries, producing two popes: Alfons de Borja, who ruled as Pope Callixtus III during 1455–1458, and his nephew Rodrigo Lanzol Borgia, as Pope Alexander VI, during 1492–1503.

Especially during the reign of Alexander VI, they were suspected of many crimes, including adultery, incest, simony, theft, bribery, and murder. Because of their grasping for power, they made enemies of the Medici, the Sforza, and the Dominican friar Girolamo Savonarola, among others. They were also patrons of the arts who contributed to the development of Renaissance art.

== History ==
=== Early history ===
The Borja was a noble house with origin in the town of Borja (Zaragoza) in the then Crown of Aragon. During this time, there were numerous unsubstantiated claims that the family was of originally Jewish descent, and were pretending to be pious Roman Catholics. These underground rumours were propagated by, among others, Giuliano della Rovere, and the family was frequently described as marranos by political opponents. The rumours have persisted in popular culture for centuries, listed in the Semi-Gotha of 1912. The family themselves propagated a spurious genealogical descent from a 12th-century claimant to the crown of the Kingdom of Aragon, Pedro de Atarés, Lord of Borja, who actually died childless.

=== Alfons ===
Alfons de Borja (1378–1458) was born to Francina Llançol and Domingo de Borja in La Torreta, Canals, which was then situated in the Kingdom of Valencia.

Alfons de Borja was a professor of law at the University of Lleida, then a diplomat for the Kings of Aragon before becoming a cardinal. At an advanced age, he was elected Pope Callixtus III in 1455 as a compromise candidate and reigned as Pope for just three years, until his death in 1458.

=== Rodrigo ===
Rodrigo Borgia (1431–1503) was born in Xàtiva, also in the Kingdom of Valencia, to Isabel de Borja i Cavanilles and Jofré Llançol i Escrivà. He studied law at Bologna and was appointed as cardinal by his uncle, Alfons Borgia, Pope Callixtus III. He was elected Pope in 1492, taking the regnal name Alexander VI. While a cardinal, he maintained a long-term illicit relationship with Vannozza dei Cattanei, with whom he had four children: Giovanni; Cesare; Lucrezia; and Gioffre. Rodrigo also had children by other women, including one daughter with his mistress, Giulia Farnese.

As Alexander VI, Rodrigo was recognized as a skilled politician and diplomat. However, he was widely criticized during his reign for his over-spending, sale of Church offices, lasciviousness, and nepotism. As Pope, he sought to acquire more personal and papal power and wealth, often ennobling and enriching the Borgia family directly. He appointed his son Giovanni as captain-general of the papal army, his foremost military representative, and established another son, Cesare, as a cardinal. Alexander used the marriages of his children to build alliances with powerful families in Italy and Spain. At the time, the Sforza family, which comprised the Milanese faction, was one of the most powerful in Europe, so Alexander united the two families by marrying Lucrezia to Giovanni Sforza. He also married Gioffre, his youngest son from Vannozza, to Sancha of Aragon of the Crown of Aragon and Naples. He established a second familial link to the Spanish royal house through Giovanni's marriage during a period of on-again/off-again conflict between France and Spain over the Kingdom of Naples.

It is reported that under Alexander VI's rule the Borgias hosted orgies in the Vatican Palace. The "Banquet of Chestnuts" is considered one of the most disreputable balls of this kind. Johann Burchard reports that fifty courtesans were in attendance for the entertainment of the banquet guests.

Pope Alexander VI died in Rome in 1503 after contracting a disease, generally believed to have been malaria. Two of Alexander's successors, Sixtus V and Urban VIII, described him as one of the most outstanding popes since St. Peter.

=== Cesare ===
A Glass of Wine with Caesar Borgia by John Collier, 1893, from left: Cesare Borgia, Lucrezia, Pope Alexander, and a young man holding an empty glass. The painting represents the popular view of the treacherous nature of the Borgias – the implication being that the young man cannot be sure that the wine is not poisoned.

Cesare was Rodrigo Borgia's second son with Vannozza dei Cattanei. Cesare's education was precisely planned by his father: he was educated by tutors in Rome until his 12th birthday. He grew up to become a charismatic man skilled at war and politics. He studied law and the humanities at the University of Perugia, then went to the University of Pisa to study theology. As soon as he graduated from the university, his father made him a cardinal.

Cesare was suspected of murdering his brother Giovanni, but there is no clear evidence to confirm this. However, Giovanni's death cleared the path for Cesare to become a layman and gain the honors his brother received from their father, Pope Alexander VI. Although Cesare had been a cardinal, he left the holy orders to gain power and take over the position Giovanni once held: a condottiero. He was finally married to French princess Charlotte d'Albret.

After Alexander's death in 1503, Cesare affected the choice of the next Pope. He needed a candidate who would not threaten his plans to create his own principality in Central Italy. Cesare's candidate (Pius III) did become Pope, but he died a month after the selection. Cesare was then forced to support Giuliano della Rovere. The cardinal promised Cesare that he could keep all of his titles and honors. Later, della Rovere betrayed him and became his fiercest enemy.

Cesare died in 1507, at Viana Castle in Navarre, Spain, while besieging the rebellious army of Count de Lerín. The castle was held by Louis de Beaumont at the time it was besieged by Cesare Borgia and King John's army of 10,000 men in 1507. In order to attempt to breach the extremely strong, natural fortification of the castle, Cesare counted on a desperate surprise attack. He was killed during the battle, in which his army failed to take the castle.

=== Lucrezia ===
Lucrezia was born in Subiaco, Italy to Cardinal Rodrigo Borgia and Roman mistress Vannozza dei Catanei. Before the age of 13, she was engaged to two Spanish princes. After her father became Pope Alexander VI she was married to Giovanni Sforza in 1493 at the age of 13. It was a typical political marriage to improve Alexander's power; however, when Pope Alexander VI no longer needed the Sforzas, the marriage was annulled in 1497 on the dubious grounds that it had never been consummated.

Shortly afterwards she was involved in a scandal involving her alleged relationship with Pedro Calderón, a Spaniard generally known as Perotto. His body was found in the Tiber on February 14, 1498, along with the body of one of Lucrezia's ladies. It is likely that Cesare had them killed as an affair would have damaged the negotiations being conducted for another marriage. During this time rumors were also spread suggesting that a child born at this time, Giovanni Borgia, also known as the Infans Romanus (child of Rome) was Lucrezia's.

Lucrezia's second marriage, to wealthy young Prince Alfonso of Aragon, allowed the Borgias to form an alliance with another powerful family. However, this relationship did not last long either. Cesare wished to strengthen his relations with France and completely break with the Kingdom of Naples. As Alfonso's father was the ruler of the Kingdom of Naples, the young husband was in great danger. Although the first attempt at murder did not succeed, Alfonso was eventually strangled in his own quarters.

Lucrezia's third and final husband was Alfonso I d'Este, Duke of Ferrara. After her father died in 1503, she lived a life of freedom in Ferrara with her husband and children. Her pregnancies were difficult and she lost several babies after birth. She died in 1519, 10 days after the birth and death of her last child, Isabella Maria. She was buried in a tomb with Isabella and Alfonso.

Lucrezia was rumored to be a notorious poisoner and she became famous for her skill at political intrigue. However, some recent revisionists have looked at her in a more sympathetic light, claiming her to be a victim of her family's deceptions.

=== Family tree ===
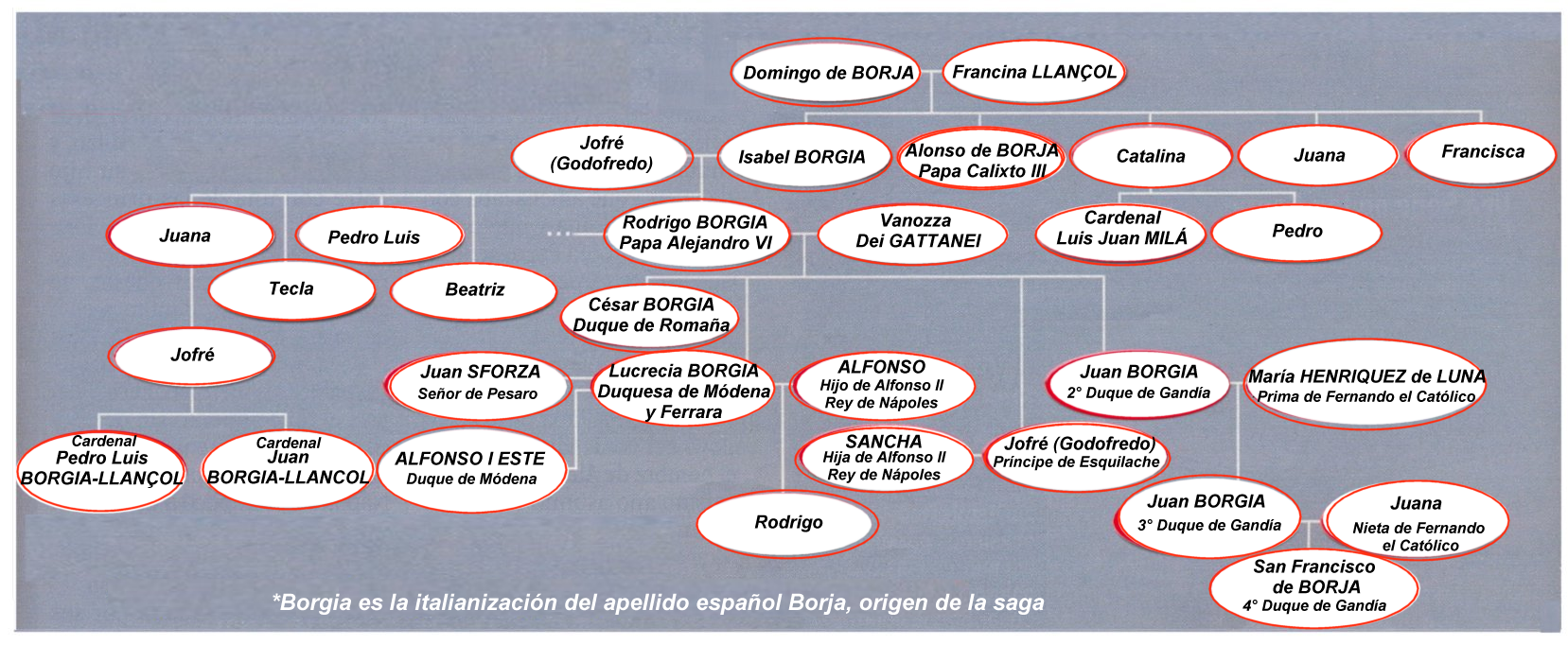
Borja or Borgia genealogy tree

=== Borgias of Velletri ===
One branch of the family established itself in the city of Velletri where for many years they served in the administration of the Papal States.

Pietro Borgia, married Madonna Filomena

- Ettore Borgia, married Porzia Landi

- Camillo Borgia, Governor of Velletri

- Clemente Erminio Borgia, Governor of Velletri, married Cecilia Carboni

- Stefano Camillo Borgia (1681–1763), married Madalena Gagliardi

- Giovanni Paolo Borgia, General in the Pontifical Army, married Alcmena Baglioni-Malatesta

- Camillo Borgia (1777–1817), Adjutant-General and Field Marshall in Murat's army, married Adelaide Quainson

- Ettore Borgia (1802–1892), Italian politician

- Alessandro Borgia (1783–1871), Lieutenant of the Grand Master of the Sovereign Military Order of Malta

- Stefano Borgia (1731–1804), Cardinal

- Alessandro Borgia (1682–1764), Archbishop of Fermo
- Fabrizio Borgia (1689–1754), Bishop of Ferentino
- Angela Caterina Borgia (1694–1743), a nun and Servant of God

=== Other notable members of the house of Borja ===
- Rodrigo de Borja (b. 1349), Head of the Borja family, great-grandfather of Rodrigo (Pope Alexander VI).
- Rodrigo Gil de Borja y Fennolet (lived late 14th century), Rodrigo's son, jurat of Xativa.
- Jofré Llançol i Escrivà (b. circa 1390 – d. 1436 or 1437), Rodrigo Gil's son; father of Rodrigo (Pope Alexander VI) and Pedro Luis.
- Pedro Luis de Borja (1432–1458), Duke of Spoleto and Marquess of Civitavecchia.
- Roderic de Borja i Escrivà (? – 1478)
- Pier Luigi de Borgia, 1st duke of Gandía (1458 or 1460 – 1488 or 1491).
- Giovanni Borgia, 2nd Duke of Gandia (1474 or 1476 – 1497)
- Gioffre Borgia (1482–1516), son of Pope Alexander VI and younger brother of Cesare Borgia and Lucrezia Borgia. He married Sancha of Aragon, daughter of Alfonso II of Naples, obtaining as her dowry both the Principality of Squillace (1494) and the Duchy of Alvito (1497). He later married Maria de Mila y Aragón.
- Juan Borgia, 3rd Duke of Gandia (1493–1543), son of Giovanni Borgia, II Duke of Gandia.
- Isabel Borgia (1498–1557), daughter of Giovanni Borgia, II Duke of Gandia, nun with the name of Francisca de Jesus.
- Angela Borgia or Angela de Borja (c. 1486 – c. 1520–1522), lady of Sassuolo.
- Enrique de Borja y Aragón (1518–1540)
- Francis Borgia, 4th Duke of Gandía (1510–1572), great-grandson of Pope Alexander VI. Became an effective organizer of the Society of Jesus. Canonized by Clement X as "Saint Francis Borgia" on 20 June 1670.
- Juan de Borja y Castro (1533–1606)
- Tomás de Borja y Castro (1551–1610)
- Juan Buenaventura de Borja y Armendia (1564* – 1628)
- Íñigo de Borja (1575–1622), great-grandson of Francis and elder brother of Gaspar.
- Gaspar de Borja y Velasco (1580–1645), born at Villalpando in Spain who unlike many of his relatives preferred to use the Spanish spelling "Borja". He served as Primate of Spain, Archbishop of Seville, and Archbishop and Viceroy of Naples.
- Francisco de Borja y Aragón (1581–1658)
- Fernando de Borja y Aragón (1583–1665)
- Arturo Borja Pérez (1892–1912), Ecuadorian poet who was part of a group known as the "Generación decapitada" (Decapitated Generation).
- Rosa Borja de Ycaza (1889–1964), Ecuadorian writer, essayist, playwright, sociologist, poet, novelist, feminist and activist.
- Luz Elisa Borja Martínez (1903–1927), Ecuadorian poet, pianist, painter, and sculptor.
- Rodrigo Borja Cevallos (1935–2025), President of the Republic of Ecuador

== Gallery ==
CÆCILIA CARBONIA CLEMENTIS ERMINY BORGLÆ
Coat of arms of the dukes of Gandía.

Coat of arms of Maria Enriquez de Luna widow of Pedro and Juan Borgia

Coat of arms of the dukes of Valentinois.

Coat of arms of Cesare Borgia as Duke of Romagna and Valentinois and Captain-General of the Church

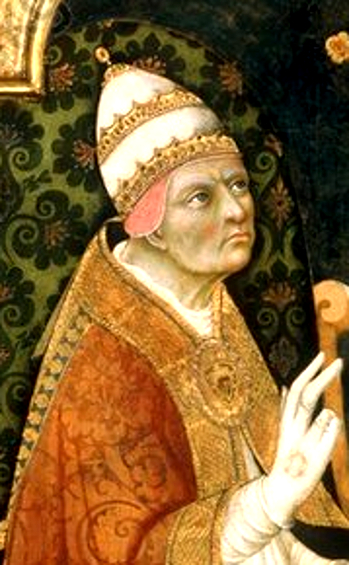
Alfons de Borja
Pope Callixtus III

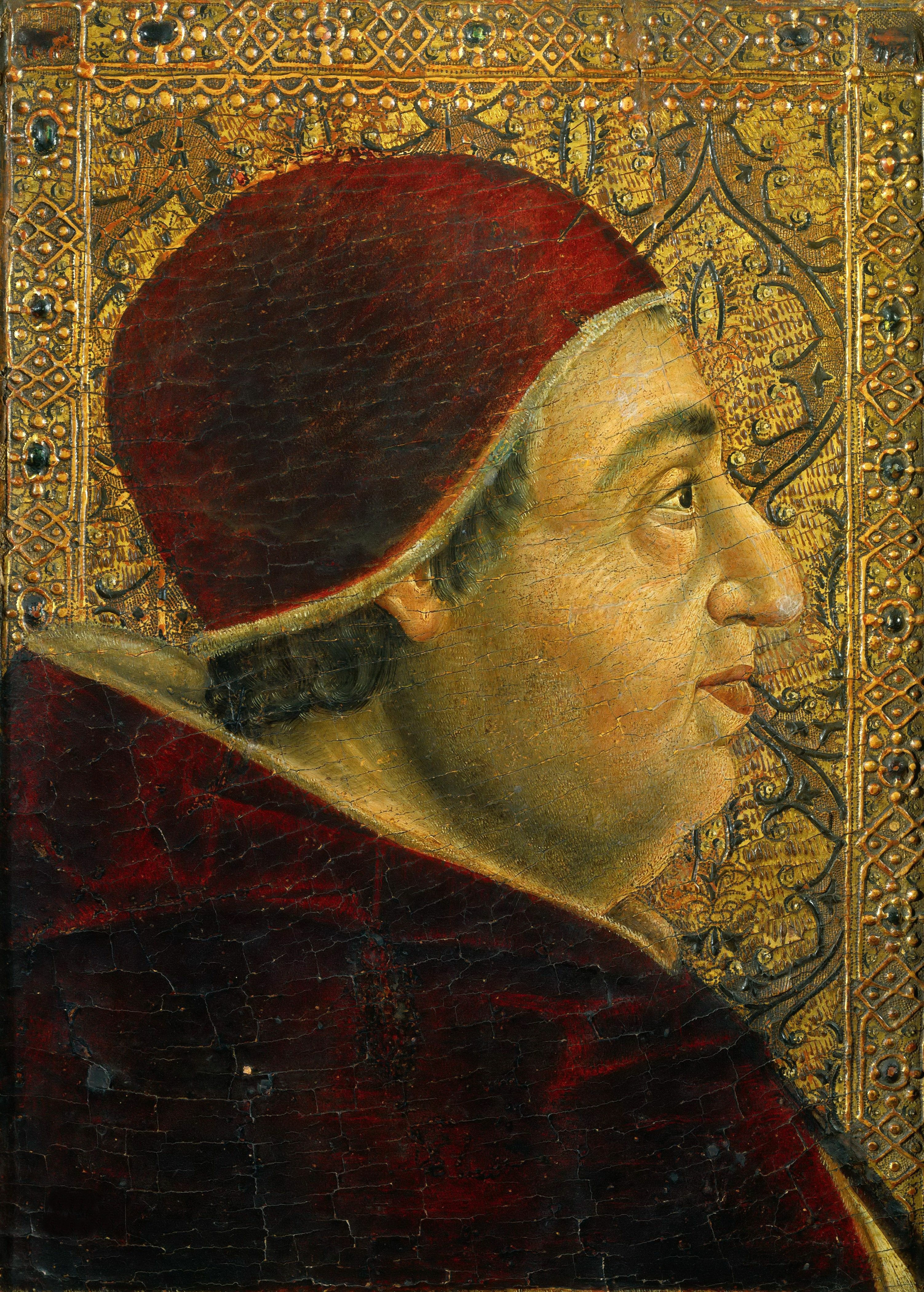
Rodrigo Borja
Pope Alexander VI, father of Cesare, Giovanni, Lucrezia and Gioffre.

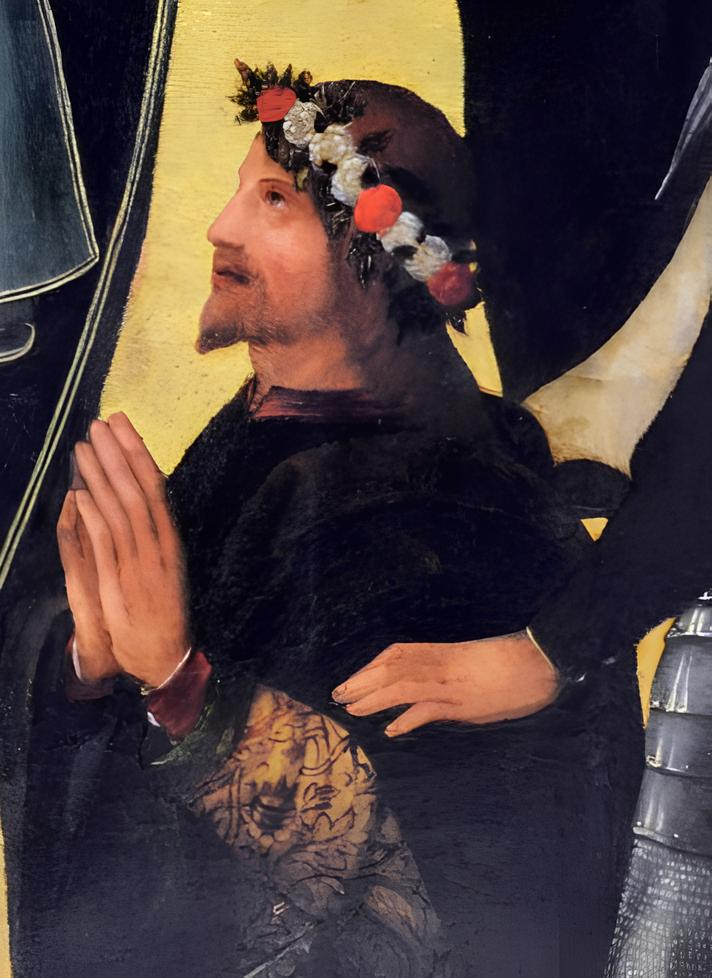
Giovanni Borgia
2nd Duke of Gandia

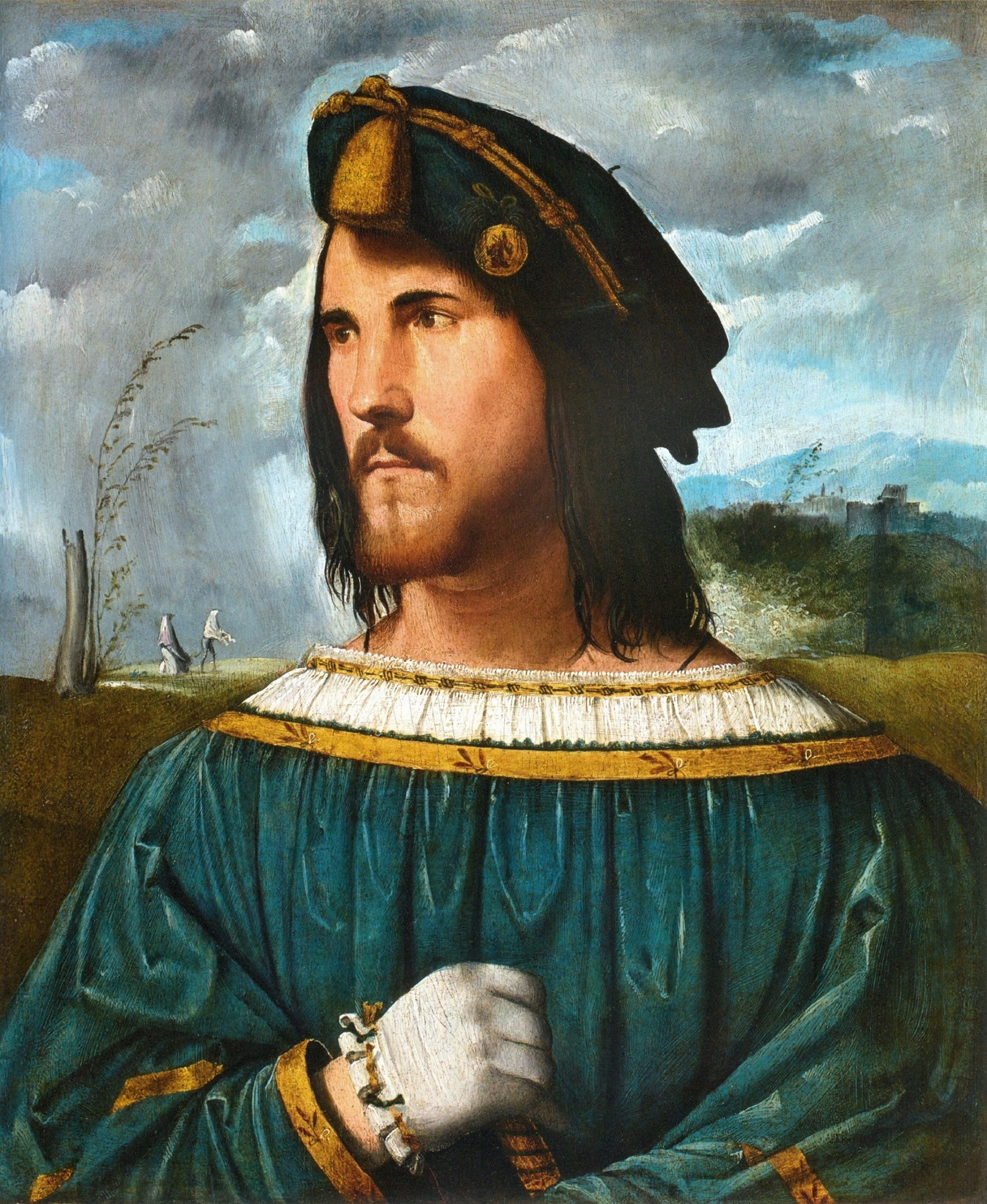
Portrait of a Gentleman, Cesare Borgia
Duke of Valentinois

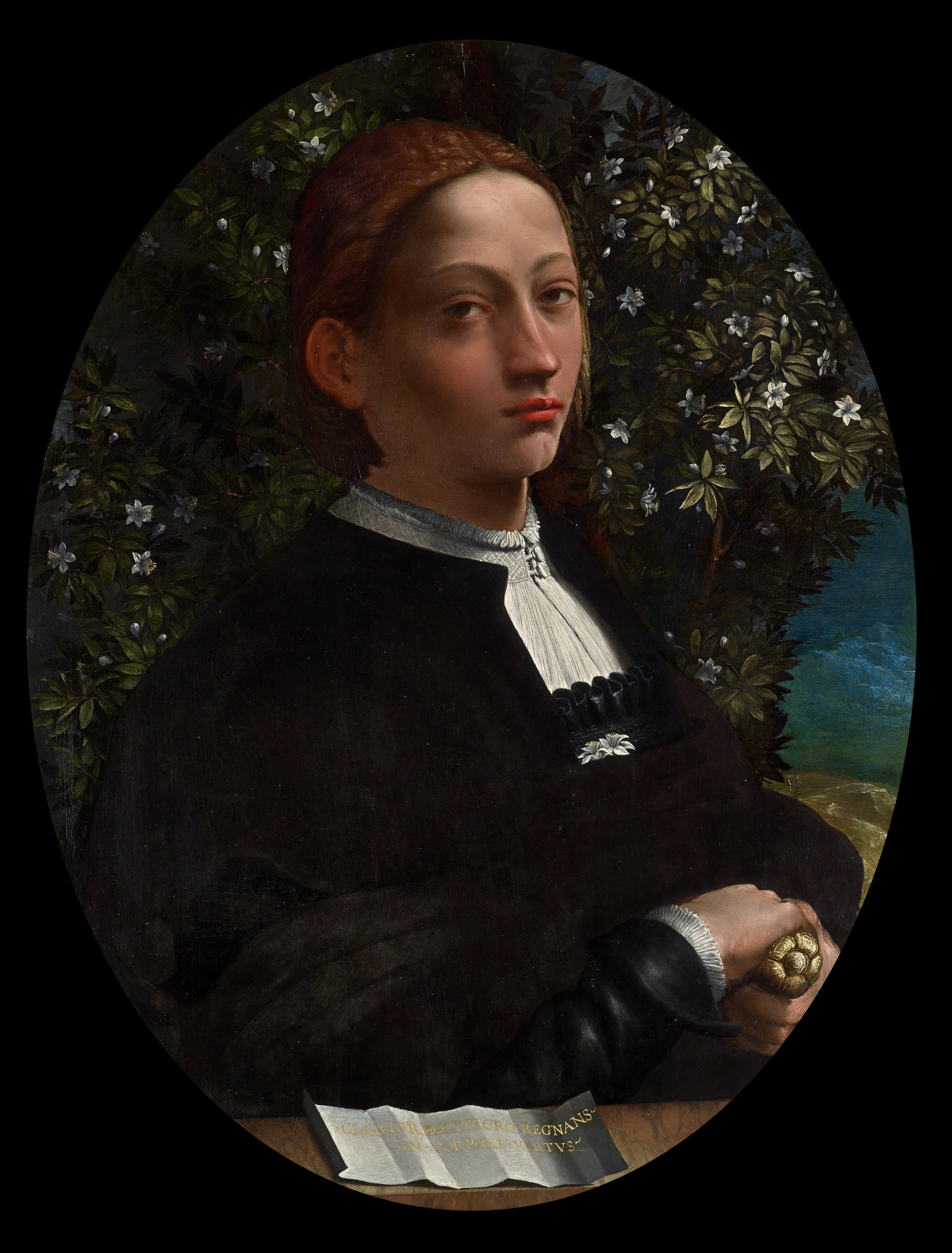
Lucrezia Borgia
Duchess of Ferrara and Modena

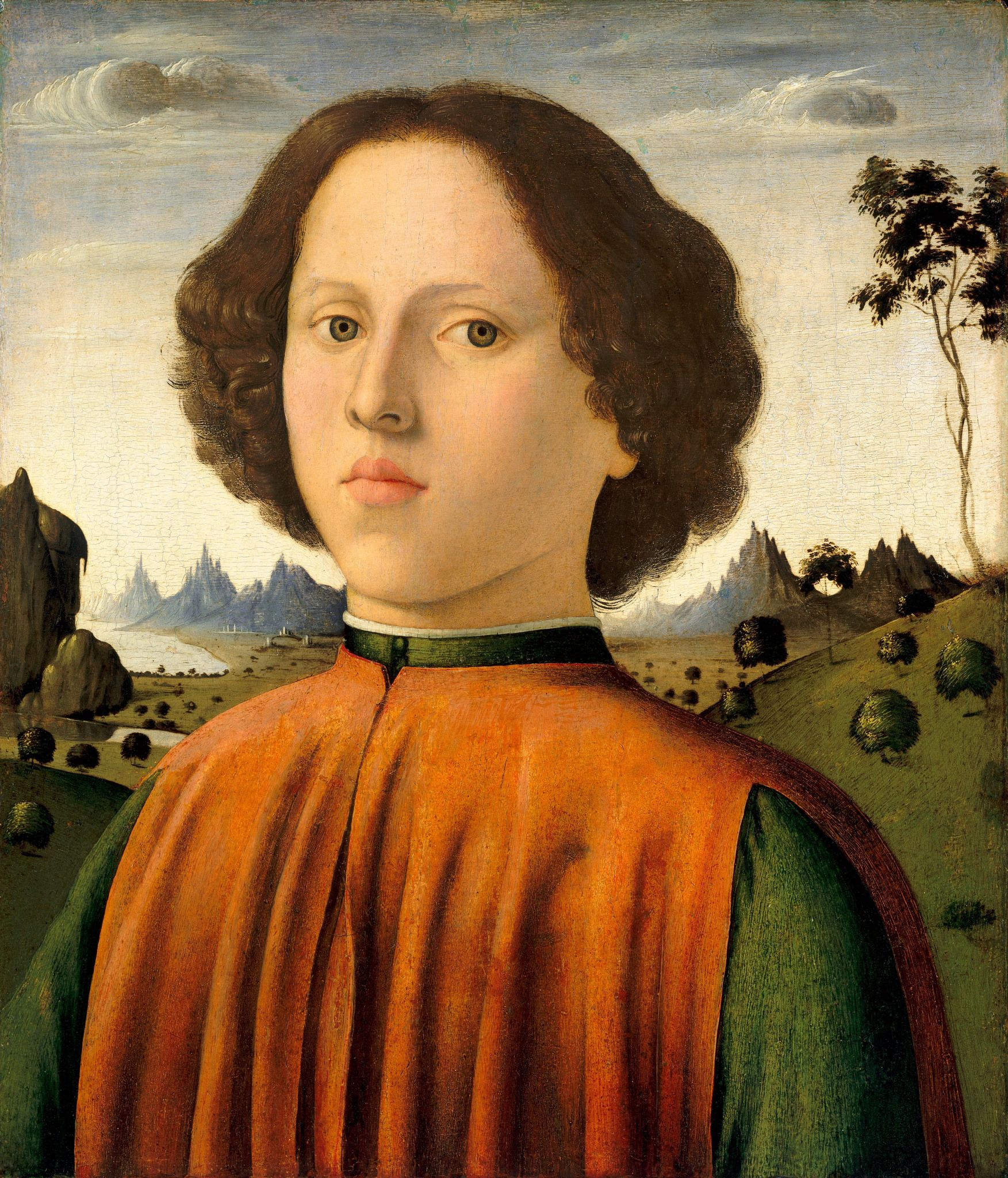
Gioffre Borgia
Prince of Squillace

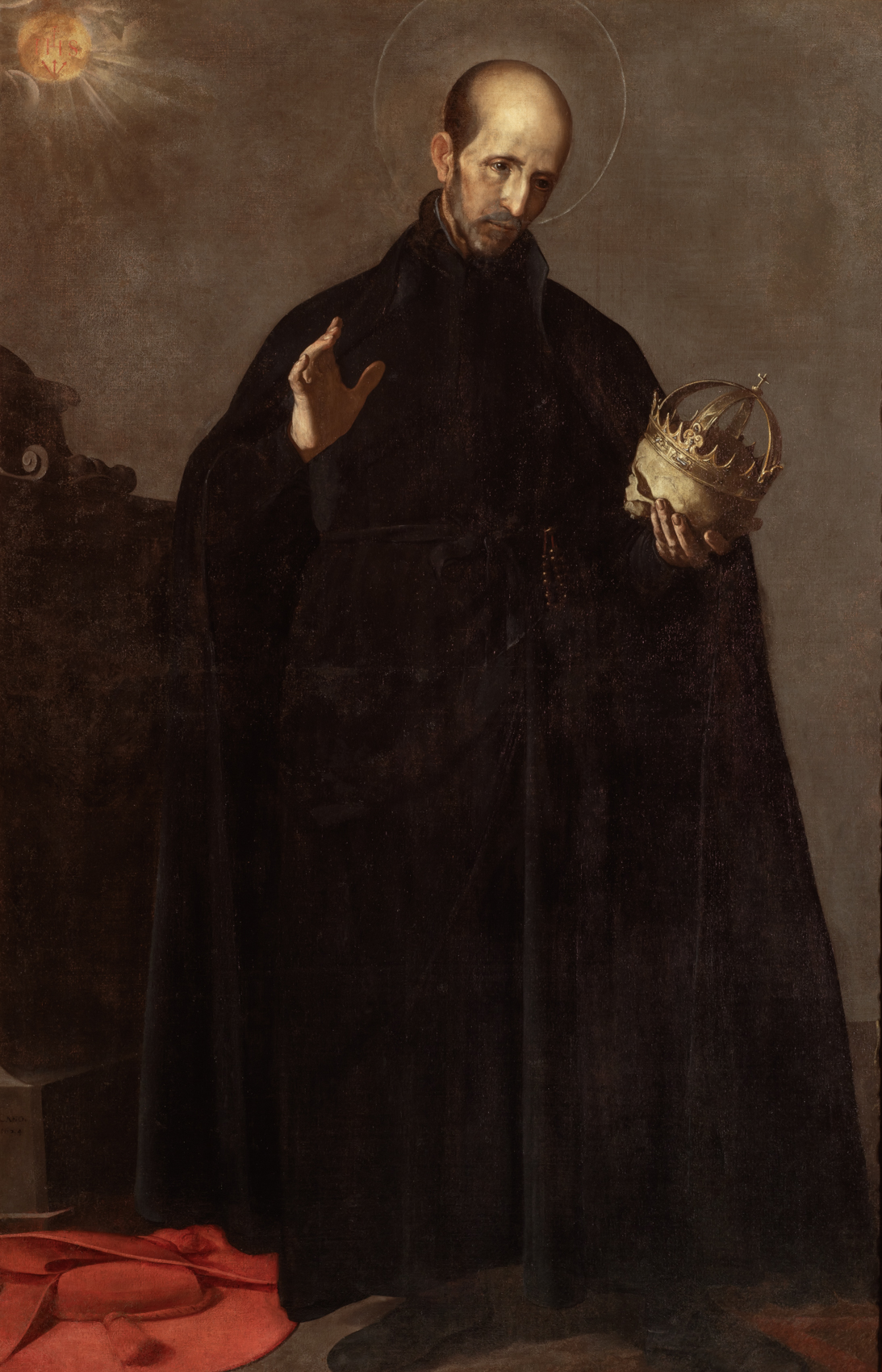
Francisco Borgia
Saint Francis Borgia, S.J., 4th Duke of Gandia

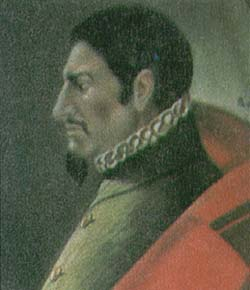
Juan Buenaventura de Borja, President of the Real Audiencia de Santa Fe de Bogotá

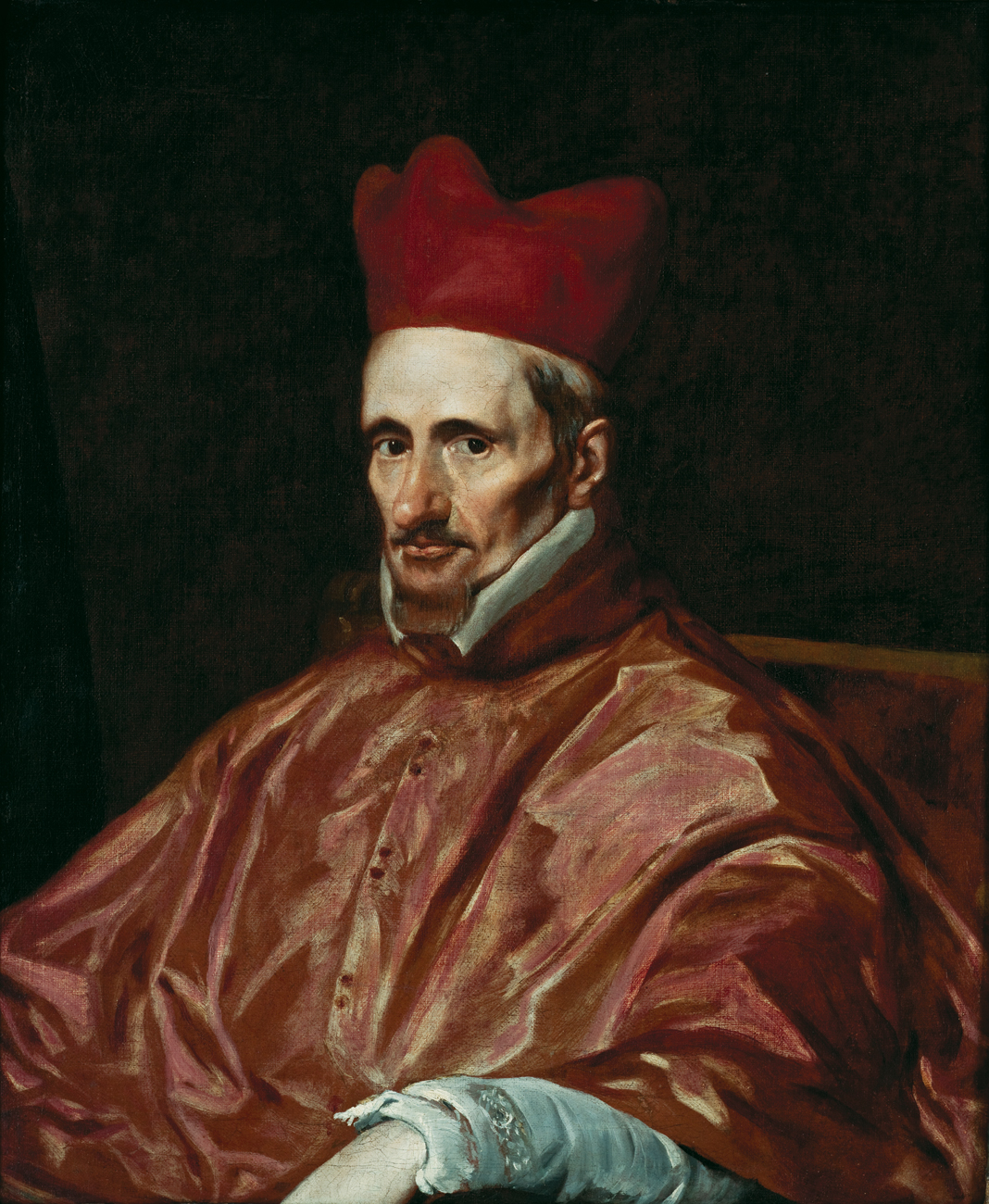
Gaspar de Borja y Velasco
Cardinal, Primate of Spain, Archbishop of Seville, and Archbishop and Viceroy of Naples

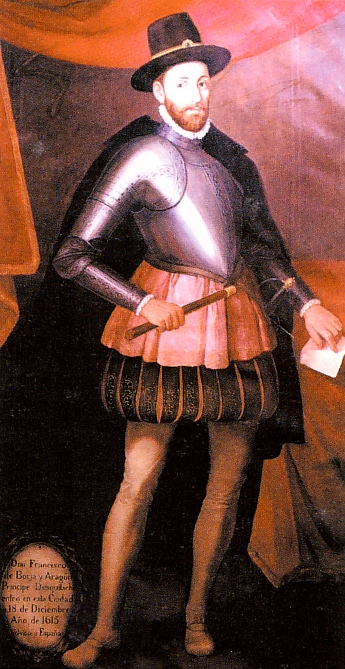
Francisco de Borja y Aragón
Prince of Squillace and Viceroy of Peru

== In popular culture ==
The Borgias were infamous in their time and have inspired numerous references in popular culture. They include novels such as City of God: A Novel of the Borgias (1979) by Cecelia Holland, The Family (2001) by Mario Puzo, and Summer of Night (1991) by Dan Simmons; plays, operas, comics; films like The Borgia (2006); television series like Borgia (2011) and The Borgias (2011) on CTV and Showtime; manhwas like “How To Win My Husband Over”; and video games such as Assassin's Creed: Brotherhood (2010) by Ubisoft.

In series 4 of the sketch comedy TV show Horrible Histories, a song called "The Borgia Family" was featured in the section 'Radical Renaissance'. The song is a parody of the theme song to the Addams Family.

== See also ==
- Grandee of Spain
- List of popes from the Borgia family
- Borgia castles
- Route of the Borgias
- Borgia Apartments
- Monastery of Sant Jeroni de Cotalba
- Ducal Palace of Gandia
- Oratory of the Borgias
- Tower and walls of the Borgias
- Palace of the Borgias
- Birthplace of Pope Alexander VI
