= Eleanora =

Eleanora or Eleonora may refer to:

== People ==
- Eleanora (name)
- Eleonora, three 17th century Swedish queens consort
- Countess Palatine Eleonora Catherine of Zweibrücken (1626–1692), Swedish princess
- Eleonora Luisa Gonzaga (1686–1741), Duchess of Rovere and Montefeltro as the wife of Francesco Maria de' Medici
- Eleonora, Princess of Ligne (born 1953), wife of Michel, 14th Prince of Ligne
- Eleanora Atherton (1782–1870), English philanthropist
- Eleonora Chiavarelli (1915–2010), wife of murdered Italian politician Aldo Moro
- Eleonora Duse (1858–1924), Italian actress, often known simply as Duse
- Eleonora Dziękiewicz (born 1978), Polish volleyball player
- Eleonora Ehrenbergová (1832–1912), Czech operatic soprano
- Eleanora Fagan (1915–1959), birth name of American jazz singer Billie Holiday
- Ulrika Eleonora of Sweden (1688–1741), Queen of Sweden

== Other uses ==
- "Eleonora" (short story), by Edgar Allan Poe
- Eleanora, principal woman's role in Strindberg's 1901 play Easter
- "Eleanora", a popular song recorded by Percy Faith
- 354 Eleonora, a large main-belt asteroid
- Eleonora (miniseries), a 1973 television miniseries directed by Silverio Blasi, with music by Bruno Nicolai

== See also ==
- Eleonora's falcon (Falco eleonorae), a medium-sized falcon, belonging to the hobby group
- Eleanor
