= Elanora =

Elanora may refer to:

- Elanora Heights, New South Wales - a suburb of Sydney
- Elanora, Queensland - a suburb of the Gold Coast

== See also ==
- Eleanora (disambiguation)
- Elanor
