= Nicholas Dawson =

Nicholas Dawson may refer to:

- Nicholas Mosby Dawson, leader in the Dawson Massacre
- Sir Nicholas Dawson, 5th Baronet (born 1957), of the Dawson baronets
- Nicholas Dawson (writer), Canadian writer (born 1982)
- Nicholas Dawson (character), the main character from Cecelia Holland's 1979 historical novel City of God
