= Ettore Borgia =

Italian politician

- Born: 1802; Velletri
- Died: 1892 (aged 89–90); Gioiosa Marea
- Occupation: Politician

Ettore Borgia (Velletri, 1802 – Gioiosa Marea, 11 July 1892) was an Italian politician and patriot.

== Biography ==
Ettore Borgia, son of Don Camillo Borgia di Velletri and Adelaide Quainson (or Quenson), belonged to the noble Borgia family of Velletri. In 1812, when he was ten years old, he had to move, by order of the French authorities, to the military college of La Flèche in France, despite the family's attempts to exempt him from this duty. When he was almost thirty years old, he was eventually able to return to his hometown and he took charge of the family with the help of his mother. Ettore never married and had no children, making him the last male direct descendant of the family.

Despite his father's revolutionary past and exile, Ettore was able to hold the position of Gonfaloniere di Velletri several times between 1840 and 1849. In addition, in 1847 he was given command of the City Guard Battalion with the rank of Lieutenant Colonel. But in 1849 he supported the Roman Republic and was even placed on the head of the Marittima Province, south of Rome.

In 1867, after the invasion of the Papal State and the arrival in Velletri by Giovanni Nicotera and his volunteer army, Ettore was appointed as member of the municipal administration for his role in the 1849 uprising. However, after Garibaldi's defeat in Mentana, he had to flee the city and follow Nicotera during his retreat.

In 1870, following the annexation of the Papal State to Italy, Ettore was rewarded for his patriotic actions over the years and was therefore appointed president of the (Provisory) Provincial Council of Rome. After the dissolution of this governmental body a few months later and due to his old age, he left active politics and became president of the nursery school of Velletri, which he helped to finance through various initiatives.

Ettore Borgia died in 1892 in San Giorgio di [Gioiosa Marea] at his nephew's house.

== Bibliography ==
- Ciccotti, Vincenzo (1999). Camillo Borgia (1773–1817). Soldato ed archeologo (Quaderni della Biblioteca comunale – 8). Velletri: Città di Velletri.
- Maggiore, Luca (2016). L'ordine pubblico nello Stato pontificio. Velletri dal 1814 al 1870. Tivoli: Tored Edizioni.
- Maggiore, Luca (2019). Velletri nel Regno d'Italia (1870–1876). Tivoli: Tored edizioni.
