= Modrá Hůrka =

- Municipality
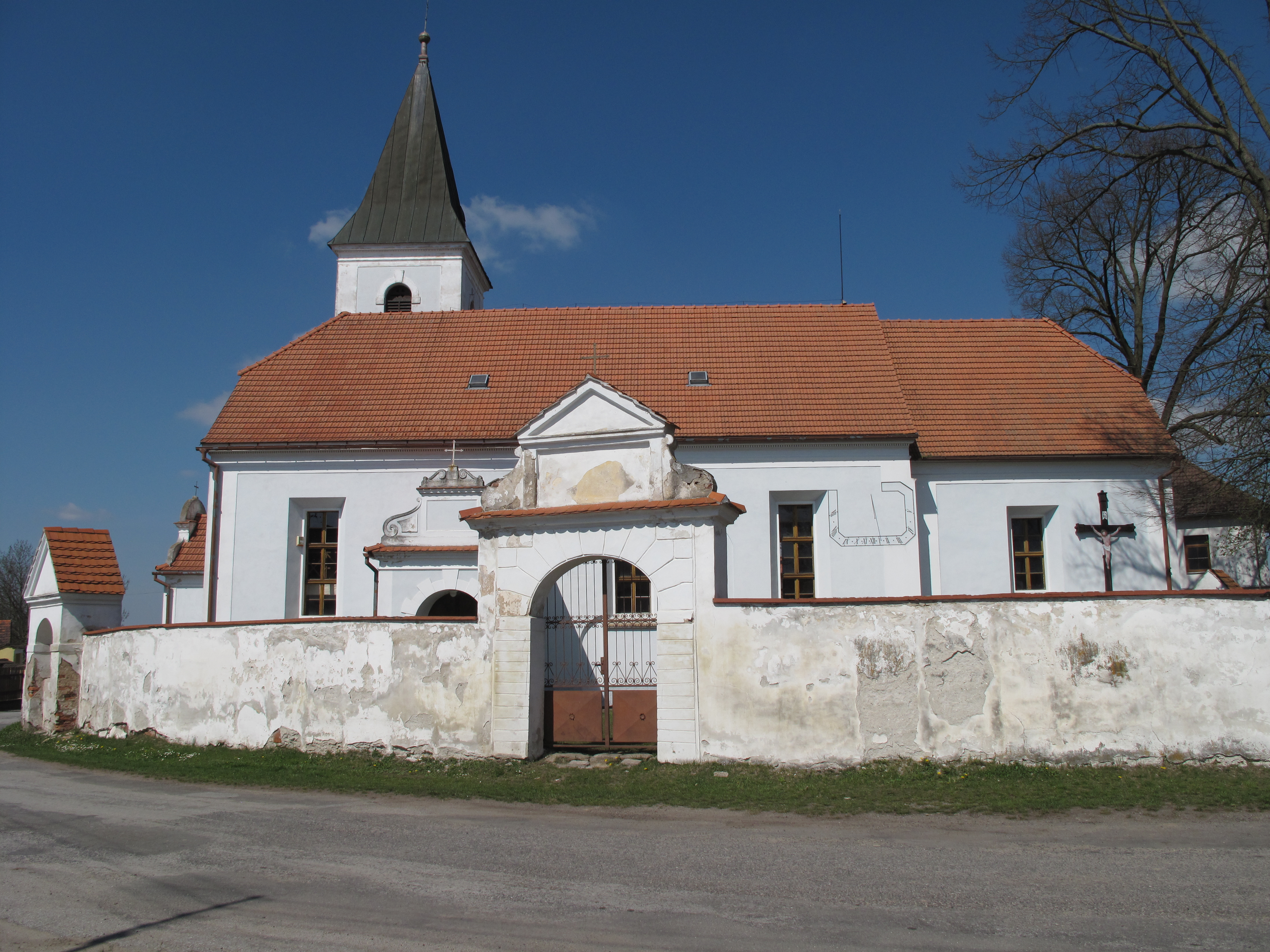
- Church of the Assumption of the Virgin Mary

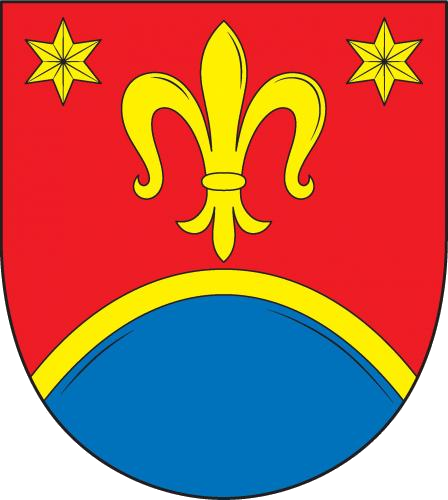
- Coat of arms

- Location in the Czech Republic
- Coordinates: 49°10′48″N 14°31′32″E
- Country: Czech Republic
- Region: South Bohemian
- District: České Budějovice
- First mentioned: 1354

Area
  - Total: 3.96 km^{2} (1.53 sq mi)
- Elevation: 513 m (1,683 ft)

Population (2026-01-01)
  - Total: 98
  - Density: 25/km^{2} (64/sq mi)
- Time zone: UTC+1 (CET)
  - Summer (DST): UTC+2 (CEST)
- Postal code: 375 01
- Website: www.modrahurka.cz

Modrá Hůrka is a municipality and village in České Budějovice District in the South Bohemian Region of the Czech Republic. It has about 100 inhabitants.

Modrá Hůrka lies approximately 24 kilometres (15 mi) north of České Budějovice and 101 km (63 mi) south of Prague.

== Administrative division ==
Modrá Hůrka consists of two municipal parts (in brackets population according to the 2021 census):

- Modrá Hůrka (67)
- Pořežánky (33)

== Demographics ==
Historical population
Year	Pop.	±%
1869	308	—
1880	311	+1.0%
1890	262	−15.8%
1900	250	−4.6%
1910	251	+0.4%
1921	221	−12.0%
1930	216	−2.3%
1950	160	−25.9%
1961	159	−0.6%
1970	134	−15.7%
1980	126	−6.0%
1991	90	−28.6%
2001	81	−10.0%
2011	65	−19.8%
2021	100	+53.8%
Source: Censuses

== Notable people ==
- Eleonora Ehrenbergová (1832–1912), opera singer
