= Castello Borgia (disambiguation) =

A number of Italian castles (or Italian: rocca) are associated with the Borgia family of Pope Alexander VI including:

- Castello Borgia in Nepi
- Rocca di Borgia in Camerino
- The Rocca Abbaziale, also referred to as the Rocca dei Borgia.

== See also ==
- List of castles in Italy
