= Anna Wahlgren =

Swedish writer (1942–2022)

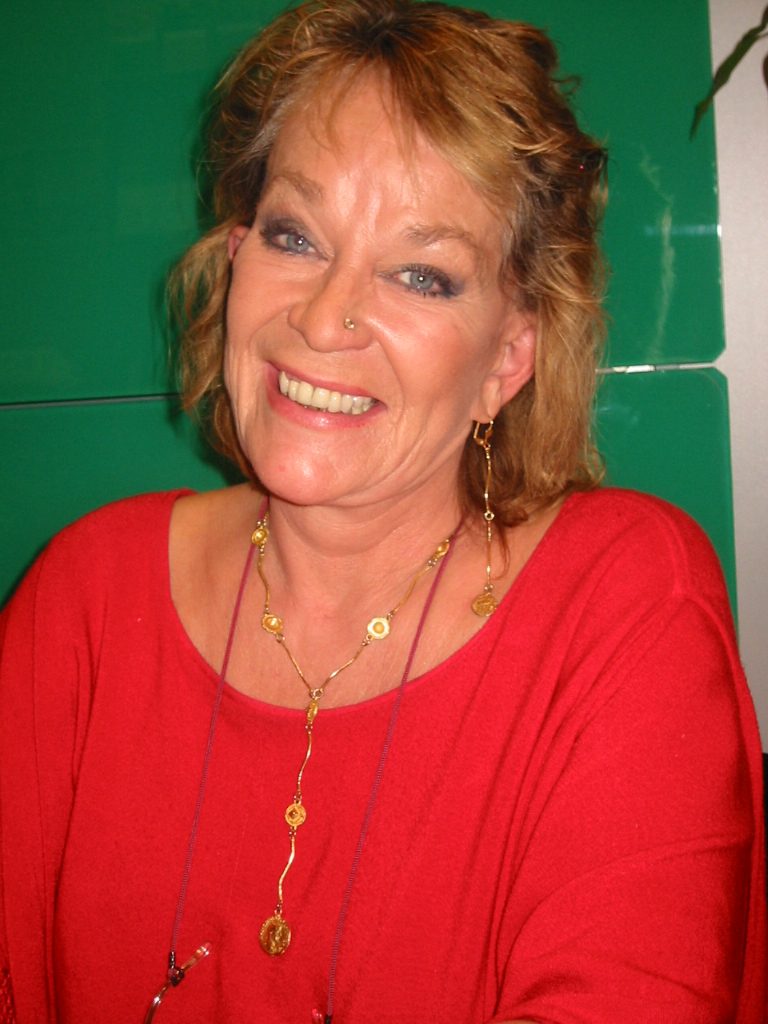
- Wahlgren at the Frankfurt Book Fair in 2006
- Born: Anna Martha Sofia Karlsson; 6 October 1942; Lund, Sweden
- Died: 7 October 2022 (aged 80); Goa, India
- Occupation: Author
- Children: 9 including Sara Danius and Eleonora von Essen
- Writing career
- Language: Swedish

Anna Martha Sofia Wahlgren (née Karlsson, 6 October 1942 – 7 October 2022) was a Swedish author and public debater.

Wahlgren was best known for her book Barnaboken, which was published in 1983. She also wrote novels, short story collections, poems, a children's book and an autobiography in three parts and was sometimes controversial participant in public debate about child rearing.

== Early life and career ==
Wahlgren was born on 6 October 1942. She was the daughter of master builder Harry Karlsson and restaurant manager Marianne Wahlgren; they divorced in 1950. She was the younger half-sister of photographer Stig T. Karlsson and builder Sven-Harry Karlsson. Wahlgren graduated from Viggbyholmsskolan in Täby in 1961 and attended Witzansky's theater school between 1962 and 1963.

Wahlgren made her debut as a writer in 1968 with the short story collection En av kvällarna i november (One of the Evenings in November) and the children's book Burken. She broke through with the novel Veka livet with a high edition for her time. Her most famous book, Barnaboken, published in 1983, has been published in several editions and translated into a number of languages.

In addition to her writing, Wahlgren has been a columnist in the weekly and daily press, including for Hemmets Journal between 1972 and 1976 and Aftonbladet in 1977. She was a Summer presenter on the radio program Sommar 1991. Wahlgren has also written plays for radio and television. TV2 has performed the play I väntrummet (In the waiting room) and four chamber plays Äkta makar (Real spouses).

== Personal life and death ==
Wahlgren was the mother of seven daughters and one son, to three husbands. One son died shortly after birth. Wahlgren was married seven times.

Among Wahlgren's nine children are literary critic Sara Danius from her first marriage, author Felicia Feldt and game developer Linus Feldt from her second marriage, and cookbook author Eleonora von Essen from her fourth marriage.

Wahlgren died on 7 October 2022 at her home in Goa, India, one day after turning 80.

== Bibliography ==
- En av kvällarna i november, noveller, 1968, Bonniers
- Burken, barnbok, 1968, Bonniers Juniorförlag
- Bilder från lustgården, noveller, 1969, Bonniers
- Veka livet, roman, 1970, Bonniers
- Ge liv, roman, 1973, Bonniers
- Den sjunde vintern, roman, 1975, Bonniers
- Man borde inte sova, 1976, Hemmets Journals bokförlag
- Fem pjäser för amatörteaterbruk, antologi,(Resan till Fagersta), 1977, Författarförlaget
- Men icke hade kärlek, noveller, 1977, Bonniers
- Jordens barn, prosapoesi, 1978, Hemmets Journals bokförlag
- Två människors rike, roman, 1978, Bonniers
- Lust och Längtan, noveller, 1978, Bonniers
- Mannen i kjol, satir, 1980, Bonniers
- Utan dig, diktberättelse, 1981, Bonniers
- I kärlekens namn, 1985, Bonniers
- Wahlgren, Anna (2008). Barnaboken : barnavård och barnuppfostran, 0–16 år (Ny utg ed.). Anna Wahlgren AB. ISBN 978-91-977736-0-7., 1983
- Fråga Anna om barn, föräldrarådgivning, 1986, Allerbok
- Rosengården, roman, 1986, Bonniers
- Sorgen, roman, 1987, Bonniers
- Dagbok, kvinnoberättelser, 1989, Bonniers
- Mommo – Det var en gång, memoarer, del 1, 1995, Sellin&Partner
- Lill-Babs – Hon är jag, biografi, 1996, Bra Böcker
- Mommo – Kvinnoliv, memoarer del 2, 1996 Sellin&Partner
- Mommo – Barnfota, memoarer del 3, 1997, Sellin&Partner
- En saga om kärlek, hängmattesåpa, 2002, Bonnier Carlsen
- Anna Wahlgren Online, föräldrarådgivning, 2002, Bonnier Carlsen
- Barnaboken, reviderad internationell nyutgåva, 2004, Bonnier Carlsen
- Sova hela natten (med dvd), 2005, Förlag Anna Wahlgren AB
- Wahlgren, Anna (2008). Internationella Sova hela natten – så hjälper du ditt lilla barn att sova gott hela natten lång. Anna Wahlgren AB. ISBN 9789163321788.
- Wahlgren, Anna (2008). Barnaboken - barnavård och barnuppfostran, 0-16 år. Anna Wahlgren AB. ISBN 9789197773607.
- Wahlgren, Anna (2009). A Good Night's Sleep - This is how you can truly help your baby to sleep through the night. Anna Wahlgren AB. ISBN 9789197773614.
- Wahlgren, Anna (2009). For the Love of Children - Childcare and Child Rearing 0-16 years. Anna Wahlgren AB. ISBN 9789197773621.
- Wahlgren, Anna (2010). Var inte rädd för att dö min älskade. Var rädd för att inte leva. Noveller av Anna Wahlgren. Anna Wahlgren AB. ISBN 9789197773652.
- Wahlgren, Anna (2010). Burken (nyutgåva). Anna Wahlgren AB. ISBN 9789197773638.
- Wahlgren, Anna (2011). Ryska Sova hela natten. Anna Wahlgren AB. ISBN 9789197773645.
- E-bok: Hem - Internationella Sova hela natten (2011).
- Wahlgren, Anna (2012). Sanning eller konsekvens: en ickeroman (in Swedish). Stockholm: Anna Wahlgren. ISBN 978-91-979631-8-3.
