= City of God (Holland novel) =

1979 novel by Cecelia Holland

City of God: A Novel of the Borgias
- US first edition
- Author: Cecelia Holland
- Language: English
- Genre: Historical fiction
- Published: 1979
- Publisher: Alfred A. Knopf
- Publication place: United States
- Media type: Print (hardcover)
- Pages: 273
- ISBN: 0-394-41277-X
- OCLC: 3845422

City of God: A Novel of the Borgias is a 1979 historical novel by Cecelia Holland. Set in Rome at the turn of the 16th century during the Borgia period, it follows Nicholas Dawson, ambitious secretary to the Florentine ambassador, as he becomes embroiled in dangerous political intrigue.

== Plot ==
Nicholas Dawson is the secretary to Ercole Bruni, the Florentine ambassador to the Roman Curia in the 15th century court of the Borgia pope, Alexander VI. Clever, ambitious and highly educated, Nicholas is also homosexual, and has been rewriting the correspondence of ambassador, who has no grasp of foreign affairs, to suit his own political views. Nicholas is enlisted as a double agent for the ruthless Cesare Borgia, and his contact in Florence is none other than Niccolò Machiavelli himself.

== Analysis ==
1981 Warner Books paperback cover, art by Elaine Duillo

The novel is set in Renaissance Rome from 1493 to August 13, 1503, which Jo Modert of the St. Louis Post-Dispatch called "a marvelous period for intrigue and treachery". Time wrote that the distinguishing factor of Holland's "imaginative tale" is its "highly original central character", Nicholas Dawson, "an intellectually gifted, arrogant homosexual without a country or a creed ... [who is] hungry for ducats and power". Kirkus Reviews described Nicholas as a "penny-pinching, boy-chasing, shadow-hugging ambassador's secretary ... [who] is loyal only to himself", noting that "crabby Nicholas, with his intellectual snobbery and self-indulgent courting of danger, is a remarkably original hero for historical fiction, unlovable but sympathetic." Modert described the character as "an intelligent, unscrupulous and ambitious young homosexual" and wrote, "Nicholas, as untrustworthy a character as you'll ever find, is also surprisingly likeable."

According to Library Review, "Holland attributes to Nicholas a keenly analytical mind, a self-serving nature, and a penchant for other men, facets which blend well with her representation of this unsettled time." She Reads Novels described the character as "a fascinating, complex character", and noted that "Nicholas is also a gay man living in a time when it is dangerous to be openly homosexual, and this adds another layer to the novel." Bookshare called Nicholas "a skilled liar, conspirator, spy, and manipulator—a man drawn to power and the pleasures of excess". He is "an intelligent servant to a weak master", and those who realize this value his opinions. David Jackson of The New York Review of Books described Nicolas as "more practical and astute than his new masters", and wrote "He is not a steel-jawed knight, he is often terrified, and circumstance alone forces him to act."

After 20 years of observing the intrigue around him—and secretly rewriting the ambassador's correspondence to suit his own political views—Nicholas becomes intimately involved in the machinations of the villainous Cesare Borgia, who seeks to conquer Florence. Holland credits Nicholas with plotting two of Cesare's most infamous crimes: the murder of his own captains and the capture of the fortress city of Urbino "by brazenly doublecrossing an ally." Kirkus Reviews noted that "Nicholas' efforts to be useful to the Borgias make him very rich, then very scared, then unemployed, then very nearly dead."

Nicholas is the master of his emotions until his devotion to Stefano, a "beautiful and dangerous young man" he takes as a lover, endangers his schemes, and his life. Jackson noted, "Love finally prompts Nicholas to break out of the golden collar and avenge Stefano, who has fallen victim to it." Kirkus Reviews wrote, "He is shown at last to possess both honor and courage, but that he survives is due mostly to chance."

== Critical reception ==
Time wrote, "As usual, Holland, who writes refreshingly taut prose, dispenses with the ponderous plots and pageantry of the genre: her people matter much more than their costumes. By substituting mental thrust and parry for the metal kind, she proves that there can be more to historical thrillers than swordplay and seduction." Kirkus Reviews called City of God "sleek, skillful historical fiction" and wrote, "With splendid period atmosphere ... and shrewd plotting, this is another costumed triumph". Bookshare described the novel as "a stunning tale of betrayal, deception, and blood", and Audrey Foote of The Washington Post called it "fascinating" and "compelling" Modert called City of God "a rattling good historical adventure" and added that Holland "is faithful to historical events, vividly depicts the geography and architecture ... and keeps her plot tense and plausible. Moreover, considering the general lechery of the period, her sexual scenes are discreet and in good taste."

David Maclaine praised City of God as a "gripping" novel of "slowly mounting tension leading to an intense pay-off. It is a brilliant introduction to the people and events that gave us the word 'Machiavellian.'" She Reads Novels called the novel "an interesting and unusual read" and wrote, "This is a book with a very dark and claustrophobic atmosphere and the writing is completely unromantic, focusing firmly on the political machinations of Nicholas and the Borgias and the intrigue of the Papal Court." The Idle Woman wrote, "As a roistering story of the Roman underbelly, full of dark alleyways, abductions and subterfuge, this should have been an absolute stunner ... and yet it's oddly stilted and unsatisfying."
