= Birthplace of Pope Alexander VI =

Coordinates: 38°59′19.99″N 0°30′58.58″W

- Casa natal del Papa Alejandro VI (Spanish)
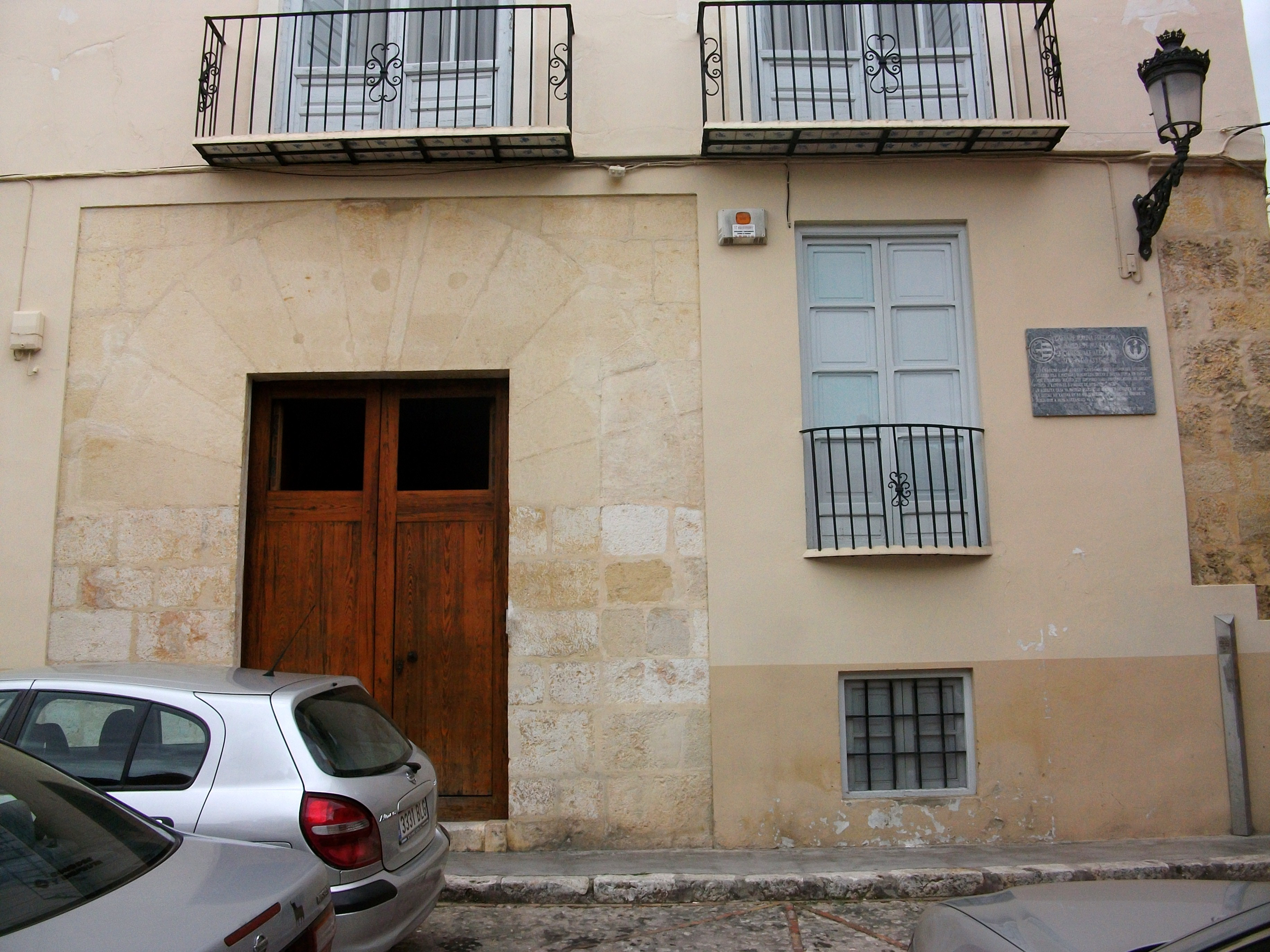
- Natal house of Alexander VI, in Xàtiva (Valencia)
- Interactive map of Birthplace of Pope Alexander VI
- Location: Xàtiva (Valencia)

History
- Built: 18th century

Site notes
- Architectural style: Valencian Barroque

Spanish Cultural Heritage
- Official name: Casa natal del Papa Alejandro VI
- Type: Non-movable

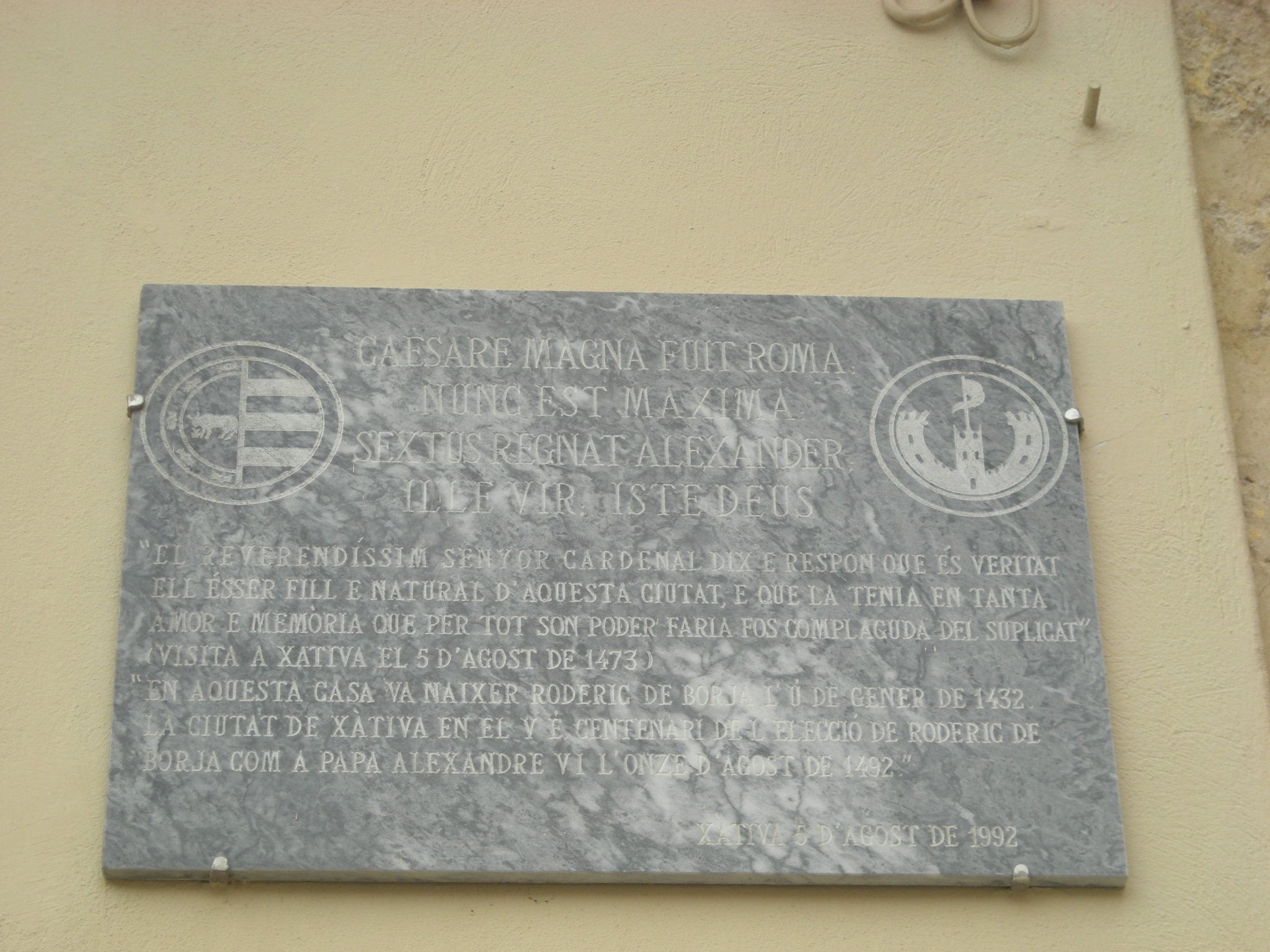
Square of the natal house of Alexander VI

The natal house of the Pope Alexander VI is located in Xàtiva (Valencia, Spain). It is a small urban house, where the Pope Alexander VI was born and lived in the Kingdom of Valencia, Spain. According to the tradition, at the number 5 of the old square of Aldomar, currently Alexander VI Square, was the birthplace of Rodrigo de Borja. From the original house where Alexander VI was born is preserved the door façade.

== See also ==
- Route of the Borgias
