= Bernardo Bilotta =

Italian priest, poet and folklorist

Bernardo Bilotta (Arbërisht: Binard Bilota; November 29, 1843 – June 16, 1918) was an Italian priest, poet and folklorist of Arbëreshë descent.

== Life and career ==
Born in Frascineto to Emanuele Bilotta and Francesca Martire, he studied in San Demetrio Corone and was ordained as a Byzantine rite priest in 1866. Interested in pedagogy and in classical and modern literatures and languages, he graduated as a school teacher and taught in elementary schools in Frascineto.

His commitment to the study and the preservation of the Arbëreshë language brought him to take part in some Arbëreshë linguistic congresses, notably to a congress held in Corigliano Calabro in 1895 and another congress held in Lungro in 1897.

As far as his poetical and writing career is concerned, Bilotta started composing in 1870 when he wrote Mercurio Dorsa. A few years later he began the epic poem La Spada di Skanderbeg a Dibre Inferiore, which he revised four times, from 1874 to 1890. Apart from his production of poems and poetry, he also wrote several philological works about the Albanian language, which he continued publishing until 1915.
