= Eleonora von Essen =

Swedish food writer and cookbook author

Linda Eleonora von Essen
- Born: Linda Eleonora Söderberg; 9 June 1978 (age 47); Täby, Stockholm County, Sweden
- Occupations: Food writer, cookbook author
- Spouse: Christian von Essen (m. 2007)
- Children: 3

Linda Eleonora von Essen (née Söderberg; born 9 June 1978) is a Swedish food writer and cookbook author.

Von Essen is the daughter of journalist and priest Bo Söderberg and author Anna Wahlgren. She was the eighth of nine full and half siblings and the younger half-sister of literary scholar Sara Danius, author Felicia Feldt and game developer Linus Feldt. She is also the granddaughter of builder Harry Karlsson and the niece of photographer Stig T. Karlsson and builder Sven-Harry Karlsson.

After graduating as a journalist, von Essen was food editor for the magazine Leva! for five years. She has since freelanced for a number of different magazines and has had her own food blog since 2008. As a food writer, she has often signed under the name Pytte.

Von Essen has published the books Bjud hem! Kokbok för glada, lata och sociala (2012), Flexitarianens kokbok – mycket grönt, lite kött (2014), Smarta snacks – nyttigare mellanmål, tilltugg och godis (2016) and Smartare mat för hela familjen (2017).

== Personal life ==
Since 2007, von Essen has been married to journalist Christian von Essen (born 1979), who is the nephew of Gustaf von Essen and the grandson of Per Erik von Essen. They have three children.
