= Ot de Montcada =

Catalan troubadour

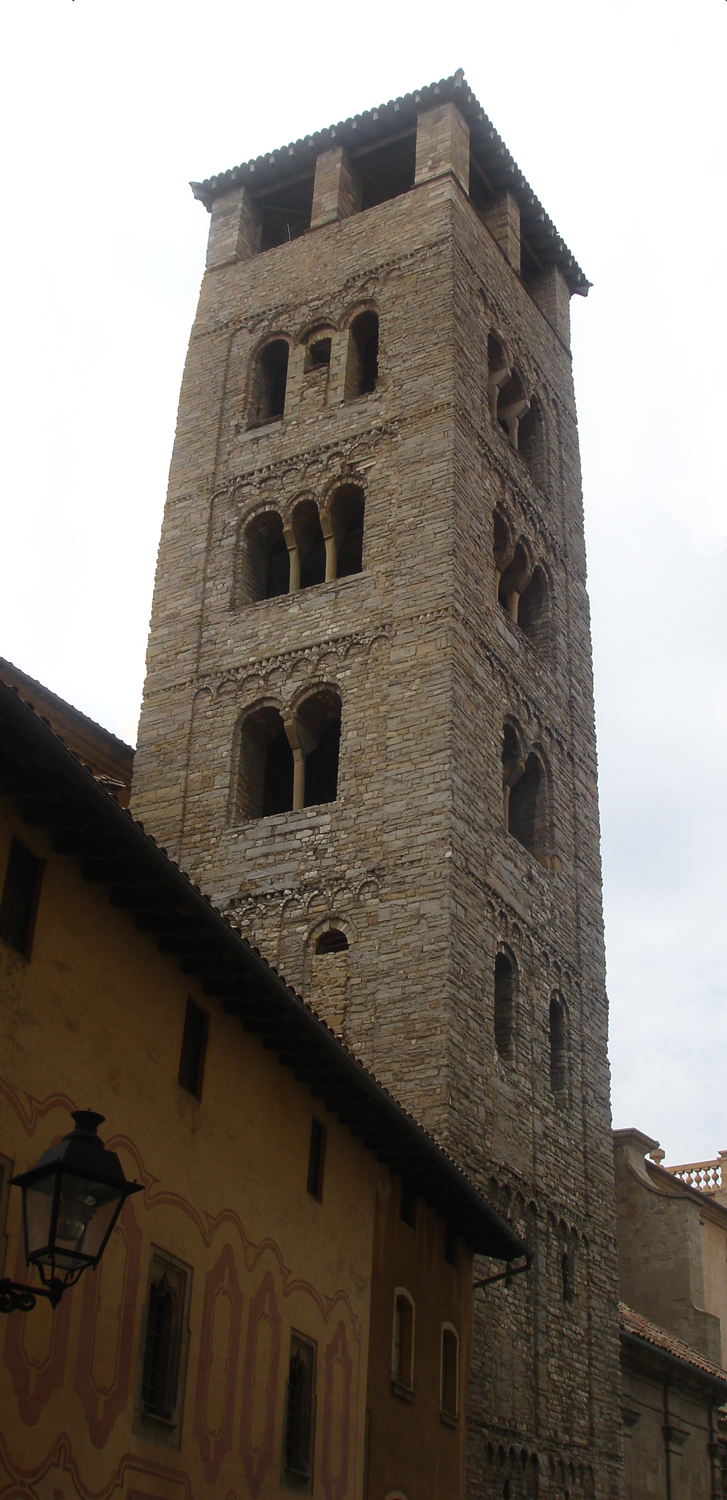
Bell tower at Vic

Ot de Montcada (Catalan: [ˈɔd də muŋˈkaðə]) was an early Catalan troubadour with no surviving work. Ot's work is known only from a reference in a sirventes of Guillem of Berguedan around 1175. By then he was considered old and out-dated. Guillem wrote his lyrics to the melody composed by Ot, who wrote it before the stone bell tower at Vic was erected:

Chanson ai comensada
que sera loing cantada
en est son vieil antic
que fetz N'Ot de Moncada
ans que peira pausada
fos el clochier de Vic.

Translation:

Here commences a song
that will long be sung
in the old ancient tune
that Sir Ot de Montcada composed
before possessed of stones
was the bell tower of Vic.

It is possible that Ot was active before 1038, since in that year the cathedral of Vic was consecrated; it was considered aged in the mid-twelfth. This dating is uncertain, however, since Guillem may have meant no more than that Ot was very old.
