= Eleonora Gonzaga =

Eleonora Gonzaga may refer to:

- Eleonora Gonzaga, Duchess of Urbino (1493–1570), daughter of Francesco II Gonzaga; wife of Francesco Maria I della Rovere, Duke of Urbino
- Eleonora Gonzaga (1598–1655), daughter of Vincenzo I Gonzaga & Eleanor de' Medici; wife of Ferdinand II, Holy Roman Emperor
- Eleonora Gonzaga (1630–1686), great-niece of previous, daughter of Charles II Gonzaga, Duke of Nevers; wife of Ferdinand III, Holy Roman Emperor
- Eleonora Luisa Gonzaga (1686–1741), daughter of Vincenzo Gonzaga, Duke of Guastalla; wife of Francesco Maria de' Medici, Duke of Rovere and Montefeltro
