= 354 Eleonora =

Main-belt asteroid

- VLT-SPHERE image of Eleonora

Discovery
- Discovered by: Auguste Charlois
- Discovery date: 17 January 1893

Designations
- Pronunciation: /ɛliəˈnɔːrə/
- Alternative designations: 1893 A
- Minor planet category: Main belt
- Adjectives: Eleonorian

Orbital characteristics
- Epoch 31 July 2016 (JD 2457600.5)
- Uncertainty parameter 0
- Observation arc: 123.16 yr (44983 d)
- Aphelion: 3.1188 AU (466.57 Gm)
- Perihelion: 2.47676 AU (370.518 Gm)
- Semi-major axis: 2.79777 AU (418.540 Gm)
- Eccentricity: 0.11474
- Orbital period (sidereal): 4.68 yr (1709.3 d)
- Mean anomaly: 123.762°
- Mean motion: 0° 12^{m} 38.196^{s} / day
- Inclination: 18.403°
- Longitude of ascending node: 140.37°
- Argument of perihelion: 5.5215°

Physical characteristics
- Dimensions: 191 × 162 × 144 km (± 14 × 12 × 12 km)
- Mean diameter: 165±3 km
- Mass: (6.61±0.49)×10^{18} kg (Note: Calculated from its standard gravitational parameter GM = 0.441±0.033 km^{3}/s^{2}.)
- Mean density: 2.81±0.26 g/cm^{3}
- Synodic rotation period: 4.277185±0.000001 h
- Axial tilt: 71°
- Pole ecliptic longitude: 154° ± 2°
- Pole ecliptic latitude: 24° ± 2°
- Geometric albedo: 0.172; 0.201±0.052
- Spectral type: S A
- Absolute magnitude (H): 6.15; 6.44

354 Eleonora is a large, stony main-belt asteroid that was discovered by the French astronomer Auguste Charlois on January 17, 1893, in Nice. This asteroid is orbiting the Sun at a distance of 2.80 AU with a moderate eccentricity (ovalness) of 0.11 and an orbital period of 4.68 years. The orbital plane is inclined at an angle of 18.4° to the plane of the ecliptic.

Photometric observations of this asteroid gave a light curve with a period of 13.623 hours. The data was used to construct a model for the asteroid, revealing it to be a regular-shaped object, spinning about a pole with ecliptic coordinates (β, λ) = (+20°, 356°), although this is with an accuracy of only ±10°. The ratio of the major to minor axes lengths is roughly equal to 1.2.

It is classified as a stony S-type asteroid and has an estimated size of 165 km. The spectrum of 354 Eleonora reveals the strong presence of the mineral olivine, a relative rarity in the asteroid belt. The surface spectrum is consistent with fine-grained material consisting of 60–70% olivine and 7–8% nickel.

During favorable oppositions, such as in 1968 and 2010, Eleonora can reach an apparent magnitude of +9.31.
