= Eleonora Bentivoglio =

Italian ruler

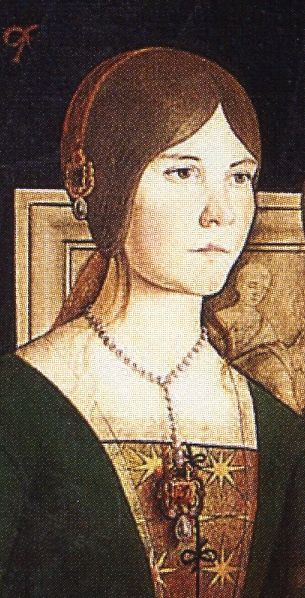
Eleonora Bentivoglio nella Pala Bentivoglio

Eleonora Bentivoglio (1470-1540) was an Italian ruler, Lady of Sassuolo by marriage to Giberto III Pio di Savoia. She was regent of the Lordship of Sassuolo between 1501 and 1505 during the minority of her son Alessandro Pio di Savoia, and regent a second time between 1517 and 1525 during the minority of her grandson Giberto II Pio di Savoia.
