= Eleonora Ehrenbergová =

Czech opera singer (1832–1912)

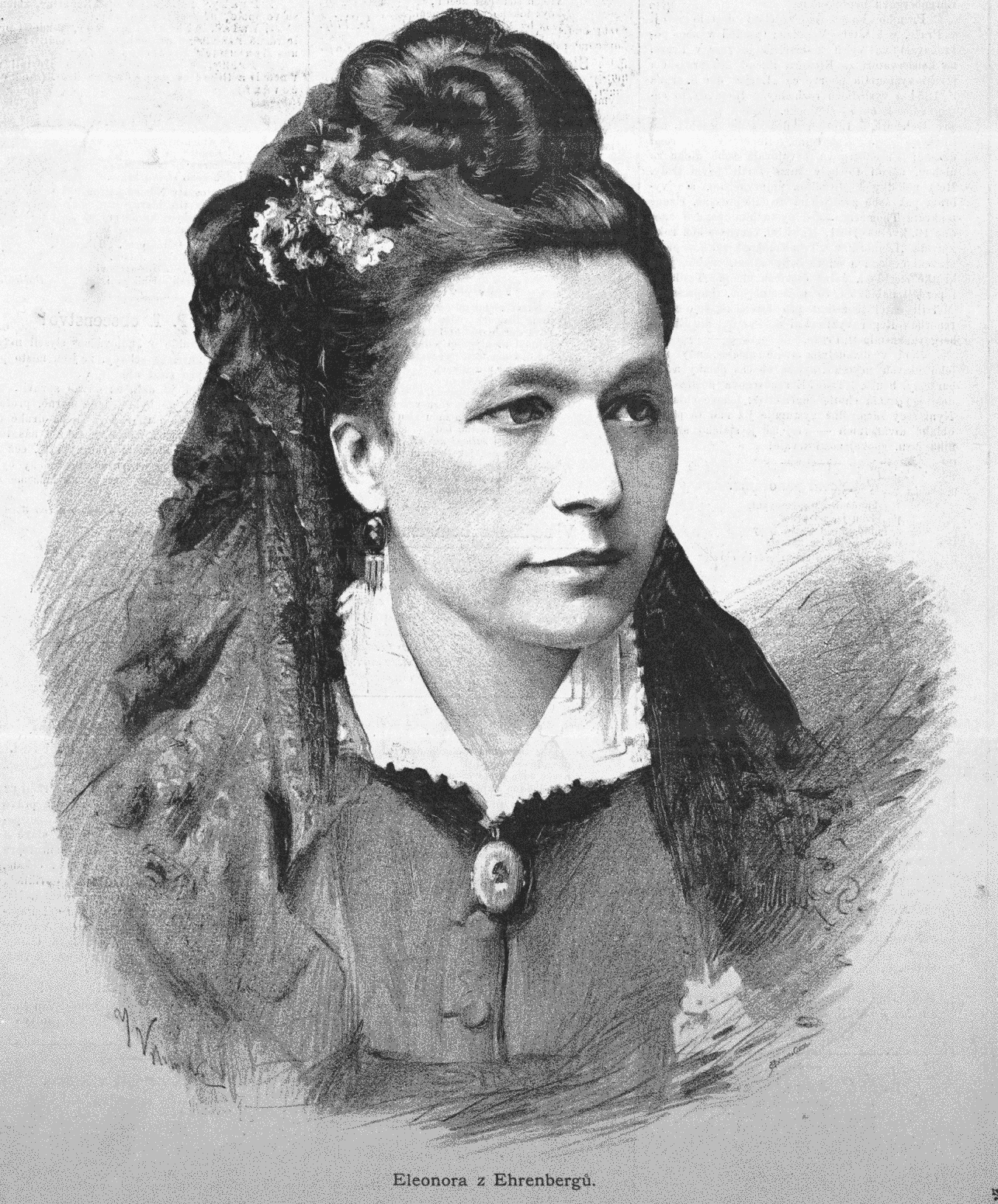
Eleonora Ehrenbergová by Jan Vilímek, 1885

Eleonora Ehrenbergová or Eleonora Gayerová z Ehrenbergů (German: Eleonora Gayer Freiin von Ehrenberg) (1 November 1832 in Modrá Hůrka – 30 August 1912 in Ondřejov) was a Czech operatic soprano.

== Career ==
In 1854 she made her professional opera debut at the Estates Theatre in the title role of Donizetti's Lucia di Lammermoor. In 1866 she created the role of Mařenka in the world première of Bedřich Smetana's The Bartered Bride, and in 1868 she portrayed Jitka in the premiere of Smetana's Dalibor. She retired from the stage sometime in the 1880s.
