= Eleonora Bruzual =

Venezuelan writer

Eleonora Bruzual (February 21) is a Venezuelan writer and journalist. She authored with her husband, José Luis Uzcátegui, a Venezuelan psychiatrist and anthropologist, Militaries: heroes or cowards and The Men Who Eroticized Fidel. As a journalist, she contributes to El Nacional, Diario Las Américas and El Nuevo Herald, has a daily radio segment called "Trinchera" on Radio Mambí of Miami (Florida) and is the editor of an information portal called Gentiuno.
