= Eleonora Bilotta =

Italian complex systems researcher

Eleonora Bilotta is an Italian researcher into complex systems and human–computer interaction, including educational entertainment, personal robots, and the use of chaos theory, cellular automata, and dynamical systems in the synthetic design of music and jewelry, especially focusing on the chaotic behavior of Chua's circuit.

Bilotta was born in 1958 in Catanzaro, in the Calabria region of Italy. She is employed as a professor of general psychology at the University of Calabria, where she also coordinates a course on complex systems, and co-directs a research group on evolutionary systems. Before joining the University of Calabria as a researcher and then professor, she was an instructor at the Magna Græcia University of Catanzaro.

With Pietro Pantano, she is the author of the books A Gallery of Chua Attractors (World Scientific, 2008) and Cellular Automata and Complex Systems: Methods for Modeling Biological Phenomena (IGI Global, 2010).
