= Vannozza dei Cattanei =

Italian noble (1442–1518)

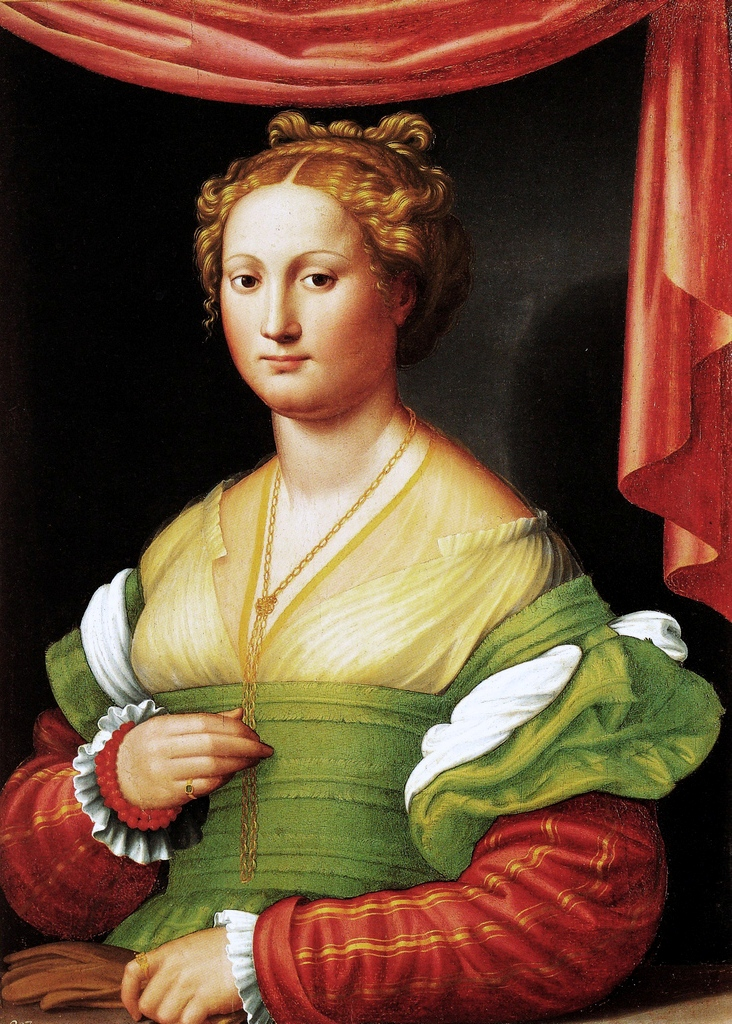
- Portrait traditionally identified as Vannozza
- Born: Giovanna dei Cattanei; 13 July 1442; Mantua, Margraviate of Mantua
- Died: 24 November 1518 (aged 76); Rome, Papal States
- Spouses: Domenico d'Arignano; Giorgio di Croce; Carlo Canale
- Partner: Pope Alexander VI (lover)
- Children: By Pope Alexander VI; Cesare Borgia; Giovanni Borgia; Lucrezia Borgia; Goffredo Borgia; By Giorgio di Croce; Ottavio di Croce
- Parents: Jacopo Cattanei (father); Menica (mother)

Giovanna "Vannozza" (dei) Cattanei (13 July 1442 – 24 November 1518) was an Italian woman who was the chief mistress of Cardinal Rodrigo de Borgia, later to become Pope Alexander VI, and mother of four of his children: Cesare, Giovanni, Lucrezia, and Goffredo, all publicly recognised by their father.

== Early life ==
Little is known about Vannozza's early life. What is certain is that she was born on 13 July 1442 to parents of Lombard origin (almost certainly from Mantua). From documents of the time it is understood that her mother was named Menica and that in 1483, already elderly, she was the widow of a certain Jacopo Cattanei. Jacopo was a painter by profession of minor nobility, who was probably the brother or brother-in-law of Andrea da Brescia, a marble worker.

According to some historians, she was born in Rome, even if some diarists of the time defined her as "the furrier of Mantua", as Vannozza probably grew up in a family of Lombard painters, marble workers, engineers and decorators who moved to Rome to work in the cardinals' palaces. In Rome, Vannozza worked as an innkeeper, managing some of the most famous and popular inns in the city, such as the Leone o dell'Angelo in the Borgo district. Among these, the best known was the Locanda del Gallo or della Vacca, in the vicolo del Gallo, a few steps from Campo de' Fiori. This establishment was frequented by high-ranking people who entertained themselves with the numerous prostitutes in Vannozza's service. In addition, she lent money on interest.

Commentators of the time spoke of her as a woman of great beauty, with blond hair, light eyes, who was endowed with a disturbing charm and an opulent beauty, in line with the aesthetic canons of the period.

== Cardinal Borgia's lover and marriages ==
There is no certain information on how and when Rodrigo and Vannozza met. Between 1465 and 1469, she met Cardinal Rodrigo Borgia, about ten years older than her, who had risen to the position of vice-chancellor of the Holy Roman Church at only 26 years of age through the intercession of his uncle, Pope Callixtus III. She established a long relationship with him, first sentimental and then emotional. Despite her position as the recognized and respected lover of one of the most powerful cardinals of the Church of Rome, Vannozza needed to have a legitimate husband. Rodrigo therefore took care of this personally, arranging all the marriages that the woman contracted during her life to his liking.

Thus in 1474, at the age of 32, Vannozza married the apostolic official Domenico Giannozzo, lord of Arignano, who was about fifty years old. In 1475 Vannozza gave birth to her first son, Cesare, who was Borgia's second son after Pier Luigi de Borgia, whom Borgia had had around 1458 from an unknown woman. Her relationship with Borgia was intense, almost daily, as demonstrated by the second pregnancy that Vannozza faced a few months after the birth of Cesare: in 1476, having been widowed by Domenico Giannozzo, she gave Borgia another son, Giovanni.

Shortly afterwards, Rodrigo arranged for her to marry Giorgio della Croce, of Milanese origins, appointed by Borgia as apostolic secretary to Pope Sixtus IV. During this period Vannozza's wealth increased considerably thanks not only to the favours she enjoyed as the concubine of the very powerful Spanish cardinal, but also to her undoubted business acumen, which allowed her to make advantageous and profitable investments. Her husband at that time was also wealthy, the owner of a splendid villa with a garden near the church of San Pietro in Vincoli, on the Esquiline Hill. This residence remained for a long time one of the places most closely linked to Vannozza's name and memory.

When, towards the end of 1479, Vannozza learned that she was pregnant again, she decided to go and spend the rest of her pregnancy in the Borgia fortress in Subiaco. On 18 April of the following year she gave birth to Lucrezia, who would become one of the leading figures of an entire era, discussed and controversial like few other figures of those years. A year later, in 1481, Vannozza gave birth to Goffredo, the last of the children she would give to Borgia. The frequentation between her and Borgia had become more sporadic, so much so that Borgia, although recognizing the son, always suspected that he was in reality the son of Vannozza's legitimate husband, Giorgio della Croce.

After her relationship with Borgia ended, Vannozza was able to devote herself more attention to her married life: thus, around 1482, Ottaviano, son of Giorgio della Croce, was born. In 1486, within a few days of each other, both her husband and son died. At 44 years of age, Vannozza was once again a widow. Borgia did not lose heart and in a few weeks he once again arranged the marriage of the mother of many of his children, planning for her what would have been by far the most successful union. On 8 June 1486 Vannozza married Carlo Canale (?-1500) from Mantua, a learned humanist with a profound knowledge of literature and poetry who had been chamberlain of Cardinal Francesco Gonzaga for many years. The new marriage marked in some way a turning point in Vannozza's life, who, together with her husband and children, decided to leave the palace in Piazza Pizzo di Merlo, given to her by Borgia at the beginning of their relationship, to move to a new home in Piazza Branca.

During the summer or rest periods, the family loved to stay in a large villa in the Suburra district, today's Monti district, where there is still a staircase called Salita dei Borgia. Carlo Canale soon became genuinely and unconditionally attached to the children of Cardinal Borgia, especially to little Lucrezia, to whom he transmitted all his love for the humanities, initiating her to the study of Greek, Latin, poetry and the arts in general. At this point, the strictly sentimental bond between Borgia and Vannozza could be said to have ended. However, in the years to come, a bond of deep affection and esteem would remain between the two, of which the fundamental glue was the visceral love that both felt for their children, even though they were destined to troubled and often painful existences.

== Pontificate of Alexander VI ==
After the death of Pope Innocent VIII on 25 July 1492, the cardinals gathered in conclave in the Sistine Chapel on 6 August to elect his successor. Only at dawn on 11 August, at the end of the fifth ballot, did the cardinals elevate Cardinal Rodrigo Borgia to the throne of Saint Peter, who took the name of Alexander VI. In the front row, on the steps of St. Peter's Basilica, Vannozza witnessed, together with Lucrezia and Rodrigo's cousin, Adriana Mila, the jubilation with which the city acclaimed the new Pope.

Upon his ascension to the papal throne, Alexander had already for some time turned his attention to the very young Giulia Farnese, daughter-in-law of his cousin Adriana, who was known throughout Rome and beyond as "Giulia the Beautiful" for the extraordinary beauty of her appearance. The girl, wife of Orsino Orsini, ended up definitively replacing Vannozza in the role of Alexander's official concubine, so much so that with Alexander's election many began to nickname her, with no little irony, Concubina Papae or even Sponsa Christi.

Soon Vannozza would be estranged from her children, called to the destiny that their father had designed for them. Vannozza was not even allowed to attend the wedding of her daughter Lucrezia with Giovanni Sforza, lord of Pesaro, and this was only the beginning of her exclusion from her children's lives. In the eleven years of Alexander's pontificate, Vannozza was kept substantially on the margins of what, despite the glaring anomalies, was still her family.

The destinies of her children would have increasingly distanced them from her. Cesare would have lived a life entirely dedicated to building an imperial dream that he would never be able to realize, engaged for years in fighting wars until he fell miserably after the death of his father, the only support for his political aims.

Even more unfortunate was the fate of Giovanni, who, upon the death of Pier Luigi, had inherited the title of Duke of Gandia in 1492. Handsome and vigorous in appearance, Giovanni was by far the favourite son of Alexander VI, who placed in him the greatest hopes of a glorious future for the House of Borgia, but the young man was in reality only a lover of entertainment and luxury and not at all inclined to the art of war and politics. After a dinner at Vannozza's house on 14 June 1497, the Duke of Gandia, recalled to Rome by his father for a failed military expedition, was mysteriously assassinated with numerous stab wounds and his body was found two days later in the waters of the Tiber. Alexander and Vannozza's pain was immense and many were suspected of being guilty of the murder, probably of political motivation.

Lucrezia, perhaps the most profitable pawn in the hands of the Pope for the construction of his designs for power, would have contracted three political marriages, at whose celebration Vannozza would always have been absent: the first with Giovanni Sforza Count of Pesaro, later annulled, then with Alfonso, Duke of Bisceglie, assassinated on the orders of Cesare, and finally with Alfonso I d'Este, who would make her the most famous Duchess of Ferrara. As for Goffredo, he lived essentially at the court of Naples as Prince of Squillace through the marriage contracted with Sancha of Aragon, daughter of King Alfonso II and sister of Alfonso, Duke of Bisceglie.

Upon Alexander's death, Vannozza followed Cesare and Goffredo to Nepi, then returned to Rome when the situation had calmed down.

Vannozza would see almost all of her children die: after Giovanni's mysterious assassination, Cesare died during the siege of Viana on the night between 11 and 12 March 1507. Ten years later, Goffredo died in January 1517 in an unclear circumstance. Only Lucrezia survived her, even if only by a few months, dying after giving birth on 24 June 1519 at the age of 39.

== Later life ==
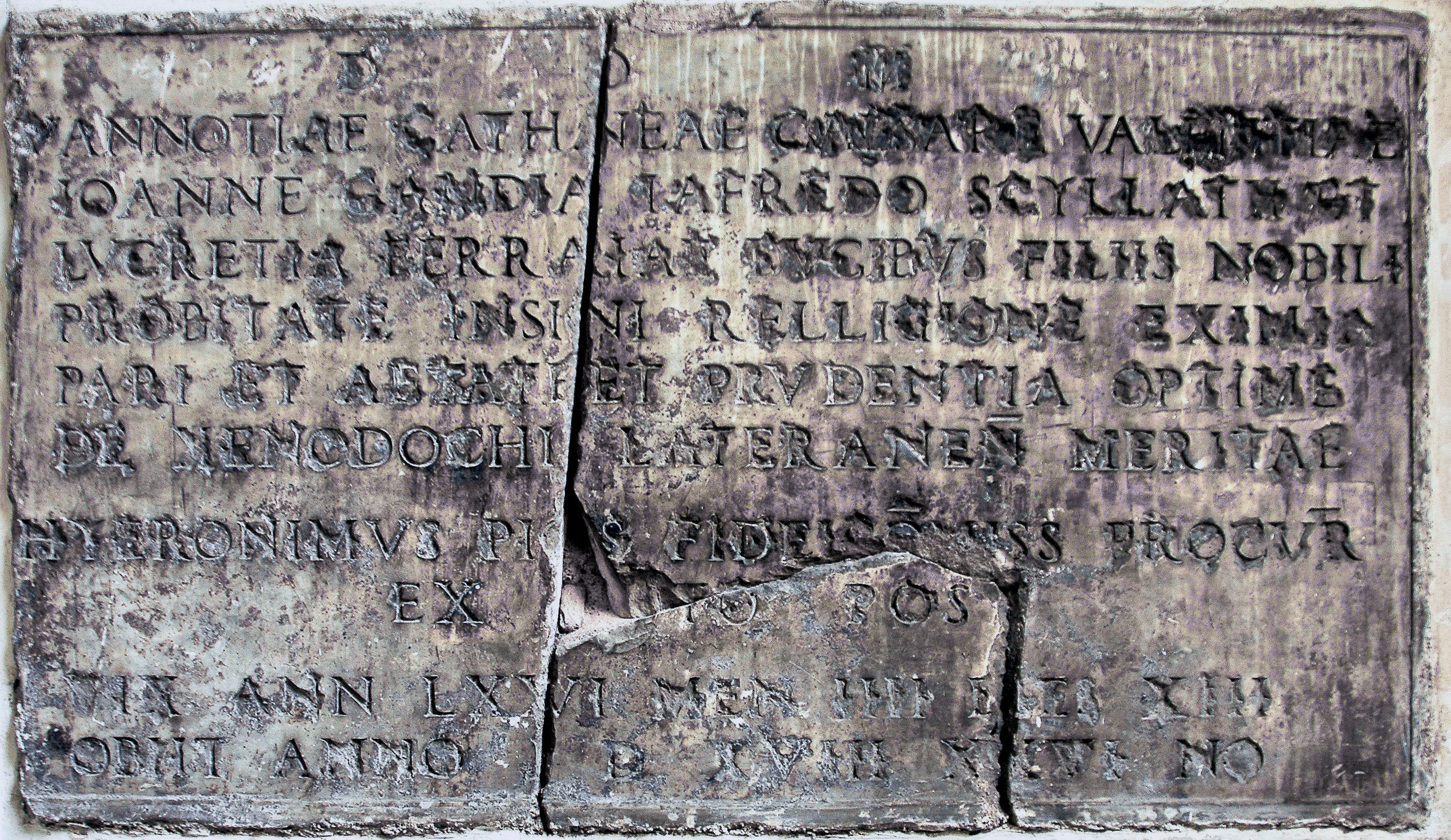
Vannozza dei Cattanei's sepulchral stone in the portico of the Basilica of San Marco

In the last years of her life, Vannozza led a life of penance, atonement and charity, so much so that Paolo Giovio, who knew her in that period, described her as a "good woman". She joined the Gonfalone confraternity, to which she left all her possessions.

Vannozza Cattanei died on 26 November 1518, at the age of 76. The instructions she gave about her burial were not respected: instead she was buried "with pomp almost equal to a cardinal", as reported by Marino Sanudo. She was interred in the Basilica of Santa Maria del Popolo, where her son Giovanni was buried. The entire papal court attended the funeral by order of Pope Leo X. Arnold Mathew wrote:

"Vannozza breathed her last at Rome, 26 November 1518, at the age of seventy-six. She was buried with conspicuous honours 'almost like a Cardinal' in the Church of Santa Maria del Popolo, near her son, the Duke of Gandia. An official character was imparted to the ceremony by the presence of the papal Court. Pope Leo X in this way recognised Vannozza either as the widow of Alexander VI or as the mother of the Duchess of Ferrara."

Vannozza's tombstone was found in 1948, after centuries of being used upside down as flooring; it was reassembled and walled up in the portico of the Basilica of San Marco, in front of Capitoline Hill, where it is still preserved today.

== Issue ==
With her lover, Rodrigo Borgia, later Pope Alexander VI, she had three sons and a daughter. Initially passed off as the offspring of Vannozza's husbands, they were all publicly acknowledged by Alexander as his own children after his accession to the papal throne:

- Cesare Borgia (1475-1507), known as "il Valentino". Cardinal, military, Duke of Romagna, and Duke of Valentinois. He was the inspiration for The Prince by Niccolò Machiavelli.
- Giovanni "Juan" Borgia (1476-1497). Captain of the Church and 2nd Duke of Gandia. He was assassinated by unknown.
- Lucrezia Borgia (1480-1519). Married three times, she was Governor of Spoleto by her right and Countess of Pesaro, Duchess of Bisceglie, and Duchess of Ferrara by marriage.
- Goffredo "Joffré" Borgia (1481-1517). Prince of Squillace through his marriage to Sancia of Aragon.

During her marriage to Giorgio di Croce, Vannozza also had another son:

- Ottavio or Ottaviano (1482 - 1486). Born after Goffredo and officially son of di Croce, he died as a child, before Rodrigo's accession to the papacy.

== In popular culture ==
In film, Vannozza dei Cattanei was portrayed by Nora Tschirner in the 2006 Canadian-German film The Conclave and by Ángela Molina in the 2006 Spanish-Italian film The Borgia.

In television, she was portrayed by Barbara Shelley in the 1981 British miniseries The Borgias, by Joanne Whalley in the 2011-13 Canadian television series The Borgias and by Assumpta Serna in the 2011-14 French-German miniseries Borgia.

She is featured in the manga Cesare by Fuyumi Soryo.

== Sources ==
- Spinosa, Antonio (1999). La saga dei Borgia. Mondadori.
- Los Borgia, Juan Antonio Cebrián, Temas de Hoy, 2006. ISBN 84-8460-596-5
