= Trogia Gazzella =

Mistress of King Alfonso II of Naples

Trogia Gazzella (also called Trusia or Turzia; 1460–1511) was an Italian noblewoman, mistress of King Alfonso II of Naples and mother of two of his illegitimate children, who both married illegitimate children of Pope Alexander VI Borgia by his mistress Vannozza Cattanei.

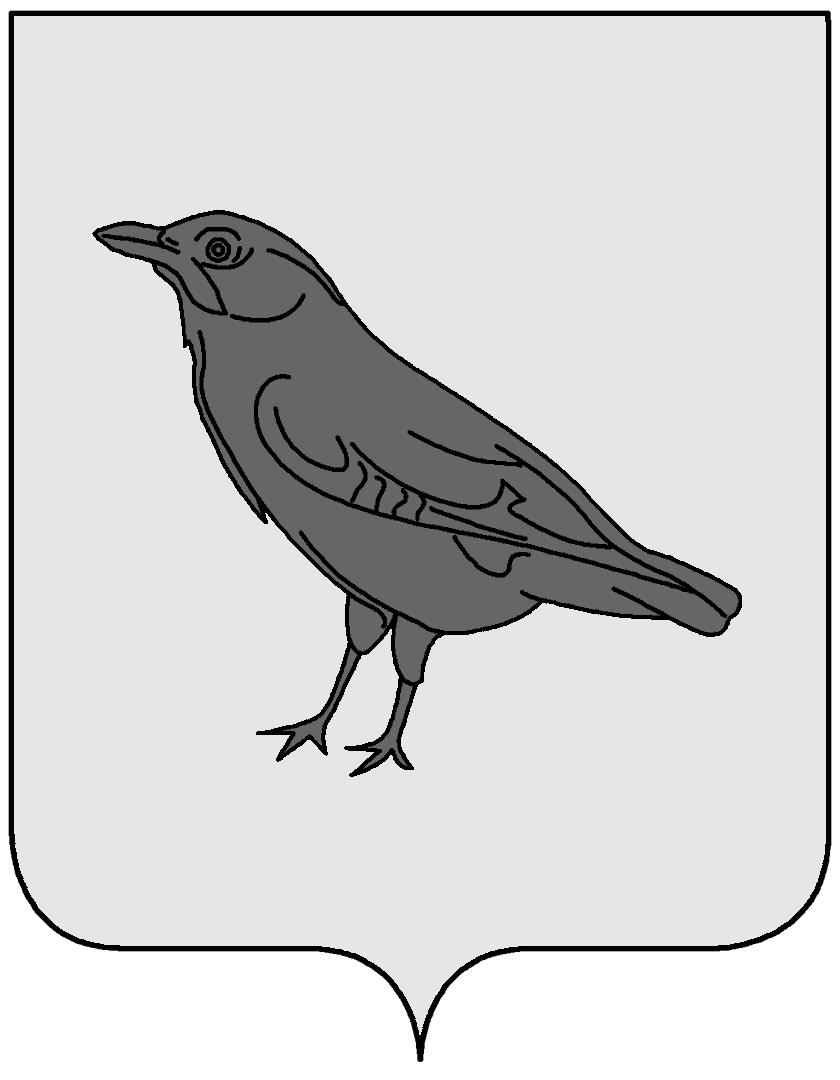
Arms of family Gazzella of Gaeta

== Biography ==
Trogia Gazzella was born in 1460 in Gaeta, daughter of Antonio Gazzella of Gaeta. and Orsina Carafa di Castelluccio. She was first married to Antonio Carbone of Naples and then, in 1495, to Cesare Gesualdo of Capua.

During her first marriage she lived at the court of Naples and became the mistress of King Alfonso II. By him she had a daughter and a son:

- Sancha of Aragon (1478–1506). She married Goffredo "Joffre" Borgia, the younger illegitimate son of Pope Alexander VI and Vannozza Cattanei, in 1494, and was Princess of Squillace.
- Alfonso of Aragon (1481–1500). Duke of Bisceglie, he married Lucrezia Borgia, Goffredo's older sister, in 1498, and was assassinated in controversial circumstances.

Trogia Gazzella died in Naples in 1511.
