= Alfonso of Naples =

Alfonso of Naples may refer to:

- Alfonso I of Naples (r. 1442–1458), called The Magnanimous, also Alfonso V of Aragon
- Alfonso II of Naples (r. 1494–1495)
