= The Borgia =

- Theatrical release poster
- Spanish: The Borgia
- Directed by: Antonio Hernández
- Screenplay by: Piero Bodrato
- Produced by: Tedy Villalba; Guido & Mauricio De Angelis
- Starring: Lluís Homar; Sergio Peris-Mencheta; María Valverde; Paz Vega; Ángela Molina
- Cinematography: Javier Salmones
- Edited by: Iván Aledo
- Music by: Angel Illarramendi
- Production companies: Ensueño Films; DAP Italy
- Distributed by: DeAPlaneta (es)
- Release date: 6 October 2006 (Spain)
- Countries: Spain; Italy
- Language: Spanish

The Borgia (Spanish: Los Borgia) is a 2006 Spanish-Italian biographical film directed by Antonio Hernández. It stars Lluís Homar, Sergio Peris-Mencheta and María Valverde as, respectively, Rodrigo, Cesare and Lucrezia Borgia.

== Cast ==
- Lluís Homar as Rodrigo Borgia
- Sergio Peris-Mencheta as Cesare Borgia
- María Valverde as Lucrezia Borgia
- Paz Vega as Caterina Sforza
- Ángela Molina as Vanozza
- Roberto Álvarez as Burckard
- Eloy Azorín as Jofré Borgia
- Linda Batista as Sancha de Aragón
- Antonio Dechent as Michele Corella
- Roberto Enríquez as Paolo Orsini
- Giorgio Marchesi as Alfonso de Aragón
- Diego Martín as Perotto
- Sergio Muñiz as Juan Borgia
- Miguel Ángel Muñoz as Ramón
- Eusebio Poncela as Giuliano della Rovere
- Kate Saunders as Giulia Farnese
- Antonio Valero as Ascanio Sforza
- Enrique Villén as Savonarola

== Release ==
Distributed by DeAPlaneta, the film was theatrically released in Spain on 6 October 2006.

== See also ==
- List of Spanish films of 2006
