= The Borgias (2011 TV series) =

Television series

- Genre: Historical drama
- Created by: Neil Jordan
- Written by: Neil Jordan; David Leland; Guy Burt
- Starring: Jeremy Irons; François Arnaud; Holliday Grainger; Joanne Whalley; Lotte Verbeek; David Oakes; Sean Harris; Ronan Vibert; Peter Sullivan; Simon McBurney; Steven Berkoff; Aidan Alexander; Julian Bleach; Thure Lindhardt; Gina McKee; Colm Feore
- Theme music composer: Trevor Morris
- Countries of origin: Canada; Ireland; Hungary
- Original language: English
- No. of seasons: 3
- No. of episodes: 29 (list of episodes)

Production
- Executive producers: Neil Jordan; Jack Rapke; Darryl Frank; John Weber; Sheila Hockin; James Flynn; David Leland (second season); Michael Hirst (first season)
- Production location: Hungary
- Cinematography: Paul Sarossy
- Running time: 48–58 minutes
- Production companies: Myriad Pictures; Amblin Television; ImageMovers; Octagon Entertainment; Take 5 Productions; CTV; Bell Media; Showtime Networks

Original release
- Network: Showtime (United States); Bravo (Canada); Sky Atlantic (United Kingdom & Ireland)
- Release: April 3, 2011 – June 16, 2013

The Borgias is an historical drama television series created by Neil Jordan. It ran for three seasons from 2011 to 2013, when it was cancelled. Set in Renaissance-era Italy, the series follows the Borgia family in their scandalous ascension to the papacy. It stars Jeremy Irons as Pope Alexander VI with François Arnaud as Cesare, Holliday Grainger as Lucrezia and David Oakes as Juan. Colm Feore also stars as Cardinal della Rovere.

The Borgias premiered on April 3, 2011 on Showtime in the US and Bravo! in Canada. That June it received its major television network premiere on the CTV Television Network. The second season followed on April 8, 2012 and the third on April 14, 2013. In June 2013, Showtime canceled the series, a season short of Jordan's planned four-season arc for the series. The cancellation was implied to be due to the expense of production, with plans for a two-hour wrap-up finale also scrapped. A fan campaign attempted to convince Showtime to revive the series, and in August it was announced that the series finale script would be released as an ebook, as a movie would be too expensive to produce.

== Plot overview ==
The series follows the rise of the Borgia family to the pinnacle of the Catholic Church and their struggles to maintain their grip on power. The beginning of the first season depicts the election of Rodrigo Borgia to the papacy through simony and bribery, with the help of his sons, Cesare and Juan. Upon winning the election, Rodrigo Borgia becomes Pope Alexander VI.

He and his family are thrust into the heart of politics in fifteenth-century Europe: from shifting loyalties within the College of Cardinals to the ambitions of the kings of Europe to the rivalries between the noble families of Italy at the time.

Meanwhile, enraged by his loss of the election to Borgia, Cardinal Giuliano della Rovere travels across Italy and France, seeking allies to depose or kill Alexander: this would force another papal conclave and race for Pope, which della Rovere is convinced he would win without Borgia to oppose him.

The series also follows the complicated sibling relationships among Cesare, Juan, and Lucrezia. Between Cesare and Juan, there is deep rivalry, with jealousy and resentment on Cesare's side; inferiority and aggression on Juan's. Juan's descent into addiction, illness, malice, and madness in the second season leads to a shocking confrontation between him and Cesare that forever changes the family. Cesare and Lucrezia have an abiding intimacy and closeness which devolves into incest in Season 3. This is the show's exploration of the persistent rumors about the historical siblings. Their youngest sibling, Gioffre, is a minor player in the first season, not seen at all in the second, and does not become a major plot point until the third and final season.

The show also addressed Lucrezia's first and second marriage, her illegitimate child, the affair between Alexander VI and Giulia "La Bella" Farnese, the rise of Girolamo Savonarola in Florence, his Bonfire of the Vanities and eventual burning for heresy.

The series cancellation prevented the death of Pope Alexander VI and the succession of Pope Julius II from being explored, and ended before the downfall of Cesare Borgia.

== Cast ==
=== Main cast ===
- Jeremy Irons as Rodrigo Borgia / Pope Alexander VI: An ambitious clergyman and patriarch of the Borgia family, he uses his position to acquire wealth, power and influence, becoming pope in 1492. Shrewd and scheming, he is utterly devoted to his family but enjoys the company of beautiful women, as well. The Pope, despite his corruption and cunning, believes he is doing what is right but often questions himself and his actions when innocents are caught in the crossfire. His favourite child is clearly shown to be Lucrezia, and he has a special fondness for her mother, Vanozza.
- François Arnaud as Cesare Borgia: Oldest son of Rodrigo, he is his father's consigliere in the church. However, he desires to leave the priesthood, preferring warfare to the clergy. Self-confident, impatient, and possessing a sharp wit, Cesare quickly earns a notorious reputation. He has a violent streak, mercilessly killing anyone to help the family's cause or eliminate romantic rivals. His love and devotion to his sister Lucrezia is his one soft spot. He hardens after the torture and death of his lover, Ursula Bonadeo, and the brutal treatment of his sister by her first husband, and brings terrible vengeance to the perpetrators of both crimes. Once disinterested in the papacy, he develops a taste for power which leads him to become a brilliant warrior and shrewd leader feared by all of Europe.
- Holliday Grainger as Lucrezia Borgia: Daughter of Rodrigo, she is the apple of her father's eye. Brilliant, witty, and exceedingly beautiful, Lucrezia proves to be her father's main asset time and again, single-handedly saving the Borgia papacy on several occasions. There also seems to be an abnormal relationship between Lucrezia and her father in season 1. From its onset, the series implies an emotionally incestuous relationship between her brother Cesare and her. Her first love is Prince Djem, and when he is murdered, she is truly heartbroken. Early in the series, she is betrothed at a young age to the abusive Giovanni Sforza, and suffers from an unhappy marriage. While married to Sforza, she has a passionate affair with Paolo, a servant, and has a child by him, but he, too, is murdered. When Lucrezia and Giulia are captured by the French king, she charms him with her wit and beauty to save Rome. She rejects her father's attempts to get her to remarry, before eventually accepting Alfonso of Aragon as her new husband. Their marriage is a failure, and drives her into Cesare's forbidden arms.
- Joanne Whalley as Vanozza Cattaneo: Courtesan and mother of the pope's children, her position as the matriarch of the family is threatened by the Borgias' newly acquired powers and the pope's new mistress, but eventually she and Giulia form a sort of friendship, and she remains in the Pope's heart. She resides in a villa and then in a dead Cardinal's Palace.
- Lotte Verbeek as Giulia Farnese: Mistress to the pope and an independent and wise woman herself, she earns the trust of Pope Alexander and becomes a close friend and mentor to Lucrezia.
- David Oakes as Juan Borgia: Second son of Rodrigo and Gonfalonier of the Papal Armies, he behaves recklessly and arrogantly, but is an inept coward. He has a cruel, violent streak but lacks the Borgia cunning possessed by his father and siblings. In the aftermath of slaying Lucrezia's beloved Paolo, he comes to fear his sister's cunning wrath (she encourages his fear, constantly toying with him and making him paranoid to avenge Paolo). After learning of abysmal behavior during his failed siege of Forli (which Juan had covered up), as well as seeing his cruelty to Lucrezia concerning her child, Cesare and Micheletto discreetly murder him after he leaves an opium den.
- Sean Harris as Micheletto Corella: Cesare's loyal henchman, he carries out ruthless killings under the order of Cesare to keep the Borgia family in power. He secretly engages in homosexual trysts, which ultimately becomes his downfall in the final season, when Micheletto takes a lover who happens to be a spy for the Sforza family, and, after being ordered to kill him, a heartbroken Micheletto abandons Cesare.
- Aidan Alexander as Gioffre Borgia: The barely pubescent youngest son of the pope, he is married to Sancia of Naples by the pope to secure an alliance with the kingdom to consolidate his papacy.
- Colm Feore as Giuliano della Rovere: A powerful cardinal in the church, after losing the papal election to Rodrigo Borgia, he devotes himself to deposing the new pope, whom he sees as lewd and blasphemous. Della Rovere's first attempt, by aligning himself with the King of France, is ultimately unsuccessful when the Pope outmaneuvers the French and persuades them to pass through Rome peacefully. His second attempt, to get a young man to become the Pope's taster, and then poison him, almost succeeds, but thanks to Lucrezia's ingenuity, he is unsuccessful, and because he chose to be at the Pope's deathbed, he is promptly arrested by Cesare, and faces torture and painful execution. However a rebellious cardinal releases him, and della Rovere escapes Rome.
- Gina McKee as Caterina Sforza: Cousin of cardinal Ascanio Sforza, Giovanni Sforza, Ludovico Sforza. Known as the legendary "Tigress of Forli" for her military prowess, she leads the powerful Sforza clan and is a chief rival for power in Italy. Like the rest of the Sforzas, she refused to support the pope against the impending French invasion. Following their victory over the French, the Borgias unleash their wrath upon the Sforzas, and Cesare is sent to Forli. He fails to persuade her to come to Rome and bow down before the Pope. Instead, she begins a passionate tryst with Cesare. A war between Caterina and the Borgias begins after Cesare kills her cousin Giovanni, avenging Lucrezia. Juan is sent to conquer Caterina, but her cousin Ludovico defeats him at Forli. Still, Juan captures and tortures Caterina's son Benito, who is then secretly taken to Rome and released by Cesare. Caterina attempts to forge an alliance with some of the Borgias' enemies, who are subsequently won over by Cesare. A failed attempt to assassinate the Pope via a biological plague agent is thwarted by Cesare, who in turn kills her son and cousin Ludovico. The Pope, through a Jewish trader and ally, buys the entire gunpowder supply in Italy, which he then grants to Cesare, who forms an alliance between the French and the Papal armies and successfully lays siege to Forli. Defeated, Caterina attempts to commit suicide by hanging, but the rope is shot by one of Cesare's generals and she is taken prisoner. Cesare then humiliates her by organizing a grand arrival into Rome with her on display in a jaded cage, wearing an extravagant, tiger-striped dress.

=== Supporting cast ===
- Ronan Vibert as Giovanni Sforza: The Lord of Pesaro, picked as the husband of Lucrezia by the pope in exchange for support from the Sforza clan. A cold and beastly man, he rapes Lucrezia repeatedly at the beginning of the marriage. He breaks his leg after falling off a horse thanks to a scheme by stable boy Paolo out of love for Lucrezia. The household staff all hate him and several of them side with Lucrezia and aid her in her affair with Paolo. He betrays the alliance with the Borgias by refusing to support them against the impending French invasion. He is later publicly humiliated by the Borgias, who convene the College of Cardinals to have his marriage to Lucrezia annulled on the grounds of impotence. When Sforza denies the charges, the Pope declares that he must prove it before the College and two prostitutes are brought in. Sforza, unable to bear the humiliation, declares that he is impotent and is sent from Rome in disgrace. Later, after making snide comments about Lucrezia to Cesare, who is on a visit to Forli to negotiate peace with his cousin, Caterina Sforza, Cesare attacks and kills him, igniting a war between the Borgias and Caterina.
- Edward Akrout as Yves d'Alègre (c. 1450 – battle of Ravenna, 1512): an outstanding French captain who became known in the early Italian Wars (1494–1512).
- Steven Berkoff as Girolamo Savonarola: An influential priest in Florence who is eventually killed for preaching against the corruption in the Church and the leadership of the Borgias.
- Simon McBurney as Johannes Burchard: The Vatican Master of Ceremonies and a scholar with impeccable expertise on canon law. To keep his position (and life), Johannes remains deliberately ambiguous about his loyalties, at times assisting both Pope Alexander VI and his enemies in their scheming.
- Augustus Prew as Alfonso II of Naples: The eldest son of King Ferdinand I of Naples. His father was old and senile, leaving himself as the effective ruler of Naples. In the series, he is eventually tortured to death by King Charles VIII, who blamed him for the plague that swept Naples, and his body is placed in his father's gruesome "Last Supper" as Judas Iscariot. However, the historical Alfonso fled to a Sicilian monastery, dying non-violently in 1495
- Luke Pasqualino as Paolo: The young servant of Giovanni Sforza. He is outraged by his master's treatment of Lucrezia and sabotages Sforza's saddle, causing his master to suffer a serious injury. He and Lucrezia later have an affair, and he fathers a child with her. He helps her escape from the Sforza household, which cost him a violent whipping from his master. He travels to Rome to search for her, naively befriending a prostitute whom Juan Borgia employs to follow him. With the help of Cesare and Micheletto, he is reunited with Lucrezia and his child for one night. Shortly after he is murdered by Juan, who hangs him to make it look like a suicide. Lucrezia is heartbroken by his death and forces her father to give Paolo a Christian burial, while also having her revenge on Juan for Paolo's murder.
- Derek Jacobi as Cardinal Orsino Orsini (fictional character): One of the cardinals who plotted against Pope Alexander, he is poisoned to death at the instruction of Cesare Borgia.
- Ruta Gedmintas as Ursula Bonadeo/Sister Martha: A noblewoman who engaged in a passionate extramarital affair with Cesare. Upon discovering Cesare killed her husband she becomes a nun and was thereafter known as Sister Martha. She is killed when the Convent of Saint Cecilia is destroyed by Charles VIII, on his way back to France after retreating from Rome. Her death fills Cesare with vengeance, and he leads a band of mercenaries to raid and destroy the French army, ultimately destroying their entire war machine.
- Elyes Gabel as Prince Cem (Djem or Jem): A rival to the Ottoman throne, who was banished by his half-brother, the Sultan. Pope Alexander accepted the Sultan's offer to host Cem in exchange for financial reward. The handsome and good-hearted young man easily wins over the Borgias, especially Lucrezia. It is heavily implied that Cem and Lucrezia fall in love, but do not consummate their relationship. Cem was eventually killed by the Borgias, who used the much more substantial reward offered by the Sultan for Cem's death, in order to pay for Lucrezia's dowry.
- Montserrat Lombard as Maria, a maid in the Orsini Palace during Giulia Farnese's stay there who is willing to testify on her indiscretions with the Pope and pays the price for it.
- Emmanuelle Chriqui as Sancha of Aragon: The illegitimate daughter of the King of Naples. When a marriage to the Borgias was proposed, Juan refused to marry her due to her illegitimacy. She was married instead to Joffre, but Juan became struck by her beauty and began an affair with her.
- Vernon Dobtcheff as Cardinal Julius Verscucci (fictional character)
- Bosco Hogan as Cardinal Piccolomini
- David Bamber as Theo: The estranged husband of Vanozza Cattaneo who was forced aside and barred from her life by Rodrigo Borgia prior to becoming pope. He lives on a remote farm the pope bought him but visits Vannozza during Lucrezia's first wedding. Cesare is civil but Juan beats him, for which the Pope severely chastises him. He is rumored to have fathered one of the Borgia children, which Juan suspects is him.
- Peter Sullivan as Ascanio Sforza: A powerful cardinal who becomes vice-chancellor in a deal with Rodrigo Borgia to elect Borgia as pope. Sforza becomes a trusted confidant and henchman to the Borgias carrying out many duties that maintain their power and wealth.
- Julian Bleach as Niccolò Machiavelli: A senior official in the Republic of Florence and adviser to the Medici family, he carefully considered the offers of alliance by Cardinal della Rovere and Cesare Borgia. Della Rovere pushes for Florence to give free passage of the French army on their way to Rome. He was upset when the Medicis yield hopelessly to the demands of the King of France in the face of total destruction of Florence by the French armies. He later allies with Cesare, providing advice on the matter of Savonarola and the location of Medici gold transports for Cesare to steal.
- Ivan Kaye as Ludovico Sforza: The brutish Duke of Milan, also known as "il Moro," who seized the throne and imprisoned his own nephew in the process. Despite an alliance of the Sforzas and the pope, he allowed the French army free passage through Milan on the way to Rome.
- Michel Muller as Charles VIII: King of France and commander of one of the most feared armies in Europe, Charles is a modernizing military leader who, in contrast to his theatrical opponents, conducts warfare with ruthless efficiency. He claimed the throne of Naples, and was enticed by Cardinal della Rovere to pursue this objective in return for deposing Pope Alexander. Insecure about his height and looks, he was charmed by the clever and beautiful Lucrezia Borgia on his way to seizing Rome, and later talked into an alliance by the pope, who agreed to recognize him as King of Naples. After discovering that Naples has been devastated by plague, he has Prince Alfonso II killed, but ends up catching the plague himself.
- Darwin Shaw as Augustino, a childhood friend of Micheletto. The two briefly resume a passionate and intense romance, but Augustino's betrothal to a baker's daughter deeply hurts Micheletto.
- David Lowe as the French Ambassador to Rome.
- Sebastian de Souza as Alfonso of Aragon, Duke of Bisceglie and Prince of Salerno: He arrived in Rome as suitor to Lucrezia, who chose to marry him as a second husband.
- Thure Lindhardt as Rufio: A student of the art of death, he is Caterina Sforza's ruthless assassin. He is sent to Rome by his patron to bring about the Borgias' downfall, and he tries to enlist Cardinal Sforza's help in doing so. At the end of season 3 with the Sforzas defeated Rufio is hired by Cesare.
- Matias Varela as King Ferdinand in Season 3. Alfonso's uncle that demands proof of his nephew's consummated marriage to Lucrezia and refuses to recognize her son at court due to his illegitimacy thus incurring the wrath of Lucrezia and Cesare. He is killed by Micheletto, who pushes him into a fanciful lake of lampreys.
- Cyron Melville as Cardinal Farnese in Season 3. He is Giulia Farnese's brother that is made a cardinal through his sister's intervention with the Pope. He manages the papal finances.
- Pilou Asbæk as Paolo Orsini in Season 3.
- Katie McGuinness, as Beatrice, in two episodes: "Paolo" and "The Choice" in Season 2.
- Patrick O'Kane as Francesco Gonzaga.
- Ana Ularu as Charlotte d'Albret, Dame de Châlus and Duchess of Valentinois. She became Cesare's wife following a pact made with King Louis XII of France to gain military support against the Sforza family.
- Jemima West as Vittoria, a young girl who disguises herself as a boy in order to be apprenticed as an artist.
- Joseph M. Kelly as Ferrante of Naples.
- Harry Taurasi as Piero de Medici.
- Luke Allen-Gale as Fredirigo.
- Abraham Belaga as Vitelezzo Vitelli.
- Björn Hlynur Haraldsson as Gian Paolo Baglioni.
- Keith Burke as Gian Galaezzo.
- Michael Poole as Pope Innocent.
- Joseph Macnab as Prospero Colonna.

Pinturicchio is mentioned as a painter of Giulia Farnese in season 1, episode 2.

== Production ==
The series is an international co-production, filmed in Hungary, and produced in Canada. Filming in Hungary mainly took place at the Korda Studios in Etyek, just west of Budapest.

Jordan had tried to direct a film about the Borgia reign for over a decade, and the project had many times come close to fruition, with stars such as Colin Farrell and Scarlett Johansson attached to it. In 2010, Steven Spielberg, the head of DreamWorks Pictures (now a producer of The Borgias), suggested the film be turned into a cable drama, and Jordan took the idea over to Showtime executives who, wanting to fill the void historical series The Tudors would leave after its final season, commissioned the series. Jordan has stated that the ideal would be a series of four seasons so he could span at least the period of Rodrigo Borgia's papacy (1492–1503).

For the role of Rodrigo Borgia, Jordan turned to Academy Award winner Jeremy Irons, known for playing villains and anti-heroes. The actor initially had second thoughts about his suitability to play someone historically described as an obese, dark-complexioned Spaniard, but Jordan wanted him to focus on the aspects of the character's obsession with power and life, which the actor could play to the hilt.

== Episodes ==
The first season consists of nine episodes; the premiere encompassed two episodes, with the remaining seven episodes being first-aired each week following. The second season consisted of ten episodes, the first half of which were written by show creator Neil Jordan, whereas the latter half was written by noted English writer-director David Leland, who joined the series' staff as co-showrunner and producer and directed its last two episodes. The finale of season 2 was written by Guy Burt, who also helped storyline the season. Season 3, the show's final season, again consists of ten episodes, four of which were written by Burt, while the other six, including the final episode, were again written by Jordan.

=== Season 1 (2011) ===
No. overall	No. in season	Title	Directed by	Written by	Original release date	US viewers (millions)
1	1	"The Poisoned Chalice"	Neil Jordan	Neil Jordan	April 3, 2011	1.06
After the death of Pope Innocent VIII, Cardinal Rodrigo Borgia, with the help of his sons, bribes and cajoles other cardinals to vote for him in the conclave to elect the new pontiff. He succeeds, and assumes the papal throne as Alexander VI. Two other ambitious cardinals, Orsini and Della Rovere, immediately begin plotting against him. When Orsini hosts a dinner for the pope and the cardinals, Rodrigo's son Cesare catches a servant, Micheletto, in the kitchen preparing to poison the Borgias' wine. Offering the assassin better pay if he works for his family, Cesare has Orsini poisoned instead.
2	2	"The Assassin"	Neil Jordan	Neil Jordan	April 3, 2011	1.06
Cesare enlists Micheletto to spy on Cardinal della Rovere, who seeks to find a legal way to depose Rodrigo as pope. He is advised by scholar Johannes Burchard that a pope who engages in "public and notorious lechery" could be deposed. Rodrigo begins an affair with Giulia Farnese, provoking the outrage of his former mistress, Vannozza dei Cattanei, and threatening to provide della Rovere with just the evidence he needs. On Micheletto's information, the pope corners Burchard and demands his support in expanding the College of Cardinals to shore up his position. Cesare sets Micheletto to work preventing della Rovere and a witness from presenting evidence against the pope.
3	3	"The Moor"	Simon Cellan Jones	Neil Jordan	April 10, 2011	0.683
Djem, brother and potential threat to the new Sultan Bayezid II of the Ottoman Empire, arrives in Rome. The Sultan is paying the Holy See handsomely to keep Djem there as a "guest", but he will pay a lot more if Djem somehow dies. Cesare declines his brothers' request of using Micheletto. The pope tries to decide who is to marry his daughter. Djem is murdered, and the grateful Sultan's gold is used as Lucrezia Borgia's dowry.
4	4	"Lucrezia's Wedding"	Simon Cellan Jones	Neil Jordan	April 17, 2011	0.708
Pope Rodrigo betroths his daughter Lucrezia to Giovanni Sforza. In order not to bring a perception of disrepute to his daughter's lineage, he forbids the girl's mother from attending the wedding, much to the chagrin of both Lucrezia and Cesare. Cardinal Della Rovere courts Neapolitan and French authorities, promising to support France's claim on Naples if he gets their aid in deposing the pope. The wedding proceeds as planned, without Vannozza. After the ceremony, however, Cesare brings her to the reception, to the shock of many of the guests. It quickly causes the marriage to go sour. The following night, Lucrezia is brought to Giovanni's home, where he rapes her.
5	5	"The Borgias in Love"	John Maybury	Neil Jordan	April 24, 2011	0.778
Lucrezia is very unhappy with her brutish husband, who brutally rapes her night after night, and the pope is tormented by nightmares about her. After trying and failing to secure safe passage for French troops from the Medici rulers of Florence, Cardianl Della Rovere makes the same request of Sforza, the Duke of Milan. Cesare follows to Florence, offering the Medici an inquisition against the preacher Savonarola, in exchange for denying free passage to the French. Lucrezia flirts seductively with a handsome young stable boy Paolo and entices him to sabotage her husband's saddle so that he will have a riding accident, which he does. The Borgias are soliciting suitable brides for Juan Borgia. Cesare interprets Ursula Bonadeo's request to be "freed" from her unhappy marriage as license to kill her husband, which he does with Micheletto's help.
6	6	"The French King"	John Maybury	Neil Jordan	May 1, 2011	0.824
Lucrezia nurses her wounded husband, and commences a love affair with Paolo. The King of Naples offers his daughter Sancha as a bride for Juan Borgia. Juan goes to Naples to sound out a possible marriage of the King's daughter to his under-age brother Joffre in his stead. Della Rovere, now in France, tries to win the favor of the French King, Charles VIII. Cesare takes Ursula as a mistress, but upon discovering that he murdered her husband, she is overwhelmed by scruples and flees to a nunnery. Joffre Borgia marries Sancha, who is having an affair with Juan.
7	7	"Death, on a Pale Horse"	Jeremy Podeswa	Neil Jordan	May 8, 2011	0.855
The aged King Ferdinand of Naples dies and is succeeded by his son Alfonso. King Charles VIII of France, with Cardinal Della Rovere in his train, invades Italy and is given free passage by the Sforza Duke of Milan. Victory seems inevitable as the French sack the city of Lucca. In fear of a similar fate, Florence capitulates to the French king's harsh terms. Rodrigo sends Giulia Farnese to Giovanni Sforza to confirm his loyalty in arms. Once there, she discovers the House of Sforza will do nothing should the invasion continue into Rome. Giulia also realizes that Lucrezia is pregnant, albeit not by her husband, and advises they both flee in secret.
8	8	"The Art of War"	Jeremy Podeswa	Neil Jordan	May 15, 2011	0.764
Giulia and Lucrezia escape Pesaro on horseback at dawn. The pope musters his forces to meet the French challenge. While Giovanni Sforza is torturing the page who aided their escape, the two ladies ride into the French army and are taken into the king's custody. Lucrezia charms the king, and when a battle is about to commence, she engineers a truce between him and her brother Juan, the general of the Papal forces. As the French approach Rome, the cardinals flee to safety.
9	9	"Nessuno (Nobody)"	Jeremy Podeswa	Neil Jordan	May 22, 2011	0.810
The French army marches into a deserted Rome. Cardinal Della Rovere expects a convening of the College of Cardinals to depose the pope, but the pope strikes a deal with King Charles of France to recognize him as ruler of Naples. Charles is crowned King of France and Naples in a pompous affair in Rome. Meanwhile, Cesare and Micheletto travel to Pesaro and kidnap Giovanni Sforza in a scheme to have his marriage with Lucrezia annulled. They frame Sforza for being unable to consummate the marriage, by obliging him to prove his potency in front of the college of cardinals. Sforza is unable to endure such ridicule and declares that he is impotent; the marriage is annulled in a humiliating ordeal for Sforza. The French army reaches Naples, where they find the city ravaged by the plague and full of corpses. Lucrezia gives birth to a baby boy, after which she is joined by the rest of the Borgias.

=== Season 2 (2012) ===
No. overall	No. in season	Title	Directed by	Written by	Original release date	US viewers (millions)
10	1	"The Borgia Bull"	Neil Jordan	Neil Jordan	April 8, 2012	0.605
The pope, pleased with the current standing of his family and their successes, decides to hold a pagan celebration in Rome for the common people. Whilst hunting he and Giulia discover a hidden alcove of art dedicated to pleasure, that he has removed and placed in the Vatican. Here he meets a young art apprentice, Vittoria, a lady disguising herself as man to whom he is attracted. Giulia, knowing that her lover has strayed whilst she was away, fears she will lose him and also befriends Vittoria. Meanwhile the King of France is suffering from the plague in Naples and captures King Alfonso, proceeding to torture him with the devices used by his own father on those who displeased him.
11	2	"Paolo"	Neil Jordan	Neil Jordan	April 15, 2012	0.534
The Pope decides to see for himself the conditions in the streets of Rome and after realising the extreme poverty enlists Giulia to try and tackle the issue. Paolo, the father of Lucrezia's child, arrives in Rome seeking her. With the help of a prostitute, he manages to meet Lucrezia again, but they are seen by Juan who is angry that his sister would love a commoner. Cesare and his mother organise one night for Paolo and Lucrezia to be together again so that he can meet his child, on the condition he leaves Rome immediately after. This he does only to be caught and killed by Juan.
12	3	"The Beautiful Deception"	Jon Amiel	Neil Jordan	April 22, 2012	0.509
The effects of the murder of Lucrezia's lover Paolo, father of her child, are played out. Cardinal Della Rovere begins to scheme to depose the pope, attempting to enlist several houses of religious along the way. King Charles, still sick with the "Neapolitan fever", returns from Naples and attempts to sack Rome, at while scheming with the Sforza family, intending to breach her walls by the use of his cannons. Pope Alexander VI attempts to have cannons cast to repel the assault, only to learn that all of the foundries in Rome could cast only one or two in the several days required for King Charles's host to reach Rome. Cardinal Cesare Borgia, attempts "The Beautiful Deception": enlisting city artisans, he has plaster mock-ups of cannons cast, which are then used to successfully bluff the King of France into riding past the Eternal City.
13	4	"Stray Dogs"	Jon Amiel	Neil Jordan	April 29, 2012	0.579
During the celebrations of the retreat of the French, Cesare finds the nuns of the Convent of St. Cecilia raped and slaughtered, including his former lover Ursula Bonadeo. Pledging vengeance he sends Micheletto out to the streets to gather men to strike those responsible. A captured scouting party reveals Giovanni Sforza's involvement as well as secrets of the French army. Ludivico Sforza petitions the pope to sanction a League to repel the French forces from Italy, with which he agrees. The pope, Cesare and Cardinal Sforza ride north leaving Lucrezia in charge of Rome. Lucrezia takes this time to address the needs of the poor and the orphans of Rome to the Consistory. On the eve of battle Cesare and his men infiltrate the French camp and destroy their gunpowder, rendering their cannon useless.
14	5	"The Choice"	Kari Skogland	Neil Jordan	May 6, 2012	0.567
With the French defeated, the pope rides to Florence to silence Savonarola while Cesare departs for Forlì to deal with Caterina Sforza. While in Florence, the pope meets with Piero de Medici and Machiavelli to discuss ways to get rid of Savonarola. After returning to Rome the roof of St. Peter's Basilica collapses during Communion and is interpreted as a sign of God's displeasure. Cesare delivers a message to Caterina to either come to Rome and bow to the pope willingly or in chains. After deliberating with Giovanni Sforza, she refuses. Cesare makes good his promise and kills Giovanni and barely escapes Forlì. Della Rovere meets with Savonarola again to receive his blessing for the murder of the pope. Receiving such he returns to the Abbey where he recruits a young monk named Antonello to become the pope's taster and poison him. Micheletto returns to his ancestral home and reconnects intimately with a man from his past.
15	6	"Day of Ashes"	John Maybury	David Leland	May 13, 2012	0.687
Cesare returns to Rome and confesses to his father he murdered Giovanni Sforza and slept with Caterina. This pushes the Pope to reveal that to secure the papacy he must now marry off Lucrezia again, much to her displeasure. Savonarola continues to gain fervor in Florence. Cardinal Sforza presents the Pope's offer of cardinal to Savonarola, which he refuses. Cesare is tasked with delivering a doomed message to Savonarola to cease preaching or face excommunication and execution. Della Rovere begins to train Antonello in the task of poisoning the pope by strengthening his reaction to cantarella. Machiavelli comes to Rome and informs Cesare of routes taken by wagons filled with gold from the Medici bank. Cesare and his men attack the caravans and bring the gold back to Rome. With the new gold, a siege of Forlì is planned but Cesare is denied his wish of commanding the Papal Army as Juan is soon to return from Spain.
16	7	"The Siege at Forlì"	Kari Skogland	David Leland	May 20, 2012	0.554
Juan Borgia returns to Rome with Conquistadors bearing gifts from the New World including a panther for Lucrezia and cigars for his father, who confuses them for "turds". In private Juan reveals he is to be a father and is given the task of taking Forlì. Juan seeks the help of a doctor who diagnoses him with syphilis. The army advances to Forlì to discover her recent armament of French cannon put to good use. While discussing terms Caterina's son is abducted by Juan and is tortured in view of his mother. Ludovico Sforza marches his army to Forlì to break the siege and decimates the Papal army with hand cannons. Caterina's son is saved from execution and Juan deserts his army and escapes into the woods. In Florence Cesare, Micheletto, and Machiavelli observe Savonarola who continues to preach against vanity. They witness the Bonfire of the Vanities. Lucrezia agrees to meet with her suitor Calvino de Genova after his brother Raffaello catches her eye.
17	8	"Truth and Lies"	John Maybury	David Leland	June 3, 2012	0.567
Lucrezia accepts Calvino's marriage proposal so she may carry on her affair with Raffaello. Juan returns to Rome and claims his injuries are proof of his courage and valor on the battlefield of Forlì. Juan's health worsens and he is introduced to opium to treat the pain. Cesare suspects that his brother is lying, which is confirmed by Caterina Sforza's son. Cesare arranges a meeting between the boy and the Pope to reveal the truth about the siege. Della Rovere sends Antonello to Rome who in turn drowns Bernardino. Cesare is given a declaration charging Savonarola with heresy.
18	9	"World of Wonders"	David Leland	David Leland	June 10, 2012	0.621
Calvino tells the pope he cannot marry Lucrezia because his brother Raffaello wishes to marry her instead. He is refused and the brothers leave Rome. With the assistance of Machiavelli, Cesare challenges Savonarola to a trial by fire. Savonarola fails the trial and loses favor in Florence. Cesare brings him to Rome for a confession under torture. Antonello is appointed as the pope's taster. Upon the baptism of Giovanni, Antonello poisons the pope's water but wine is chosen instead. Juan continues to deteriorate and puts Giovanni's life in danger, enraging Lucrezia. In response, Cesare and Micheletto track him down to an opium den, lure him to a bridge and kill him.
19	10	"The Confession"	David Leland	Guy Burt	June 17, 2012	0.517
Savonarola is tortured for a confession of heresy. After a confession is forged, Savonarola is burned at the stake. Juan's body is discovered and the pope refuses to have a funeral until his killer is found, leading Cesare to admit his guilt to his grief-stricken father. Cesare is finally absolved of his vows after his father realizes the mistakes he made with Juan. Lucrezia chooses a suitor to marry. Antonello makes his next move: the pope is poisoned, ending the season with a cliff-hanger.

=== Season 3 (2013) ===
No. overall	No. in season	Title	Directed by	Written by	Original release date	US viewers (millions)
20	1	"The Face of Death"	Kari Skogland	Guy Burt	April 14, 2013	0.582
Pope Alexander fights for his life after having been poisoned, and the Cardinals plot at his deathbed. Cesare and Micheletto trace the assassination plot back to its source, but Della Rovere is ready to make his move. Caterina Sforza has dispatched her own personal assassin Rufio to dethrone the Borgia family. However, thanks to Lucrezia's quick thinking, she saves her father, and he awakens. Della Rovere is arrested, but is later released by a traitorous cardinal, and flees, and Rufio's attempt to assassinate the Borgia family is thwarted.
21	2	"The Purge"	Kari Skogland	Neil Jordan	April 21, 2013	0.474
Now fully recovered, Alexander tasks Cardinal Sforza with instigating an "inquisition" among the Cardinals who were plotting against him whilst dying. With the "evidence" he needs, Alexander dismisses and banishes all the Cardinals he does not trust. But Cardinal Orsini does not leave quietly, forcing blood to spill. Caterina Sforza orders Rufio to seek support from the mercenary warlords of the Romagna families – Orsini, Vitelli and Colonna. Lucrezia is annoyed that her future in-laws will not welcome her son, Giovanni, at court and also rejection from Alfonso because he refuses to have sex before marriage. This makes her realize how much she loves and relies on Cesare, and she pleads with him to negotiate for her son to follow her to Naples.
22	3	"Siblings"	Jon Amiel	Guy Burt	April 28, 2013	0.569
As the purged Cardinals are dismissed and stripped of their titles and wealth Cardinal Versucci angrily sets the Vatican Treasury ablaze after stealing a large sum, which he gives to a small convent. Incensed by the new King Ferdinand's arrogant refusal to accept Giovanni as Lucrezia's child, Cesare travels to Naples to fix the problem and begins to consider an alliance with the old enemy France. After Lucrezia and Alfonso's wedding, Alfonso sees that Cesare isn't sure about his allegiance to the Borgia family. Upset, he leaves Lucrezia alone and the marriage unconsummated. Deciding that only a Borgia can truly love a Borgia, Lucrezia visits Cesare in his chambers and makes love to him, committing incest.
23	4	"The Banquet of Chestnuts"	Jon Amiel	Guy Burt	May 5, 2013	0.674
Newly appointed Cardinal Farnese is placed in the Treasury and quickly discovers Versucci's theft. Micheletto is sent to find the wayward cardinal. Meanwhile, upon hearing of Venice's request for help against Turkish pirates, Alexander, seeing this as an opportunity to replenish the coffers, dramatically calls for a Crusade. Concerned about the loyalty of his new cardinals, Giulia arranges a trap for them – the "banquet of chestnuts". At the feast details of the cardinals' sexual activities with prostitutes dressed as nuns are recorded to extort their future loyalty. Elsewhere, King Ferdinand learns that Lucrezia and Alfonso's marriage has not been consummated and demands a witnessed display of their consummation from members of both families. Lucrezia is humiliated, but goes through with it as King Ferdinand and Cesare watch.
24	5	"The Wolf and the Lamb"	Kari Skogland	Neil Jordan	May 12, 2013	0.749
Cesare's diplomatic mission to France is a success, Cesare makes an ally of Archbishop d'Amboise, and marries Charlotte d'Albret. Back in Rome, the seductive and dangerously insane Bianca takes her own life, prompting Alexander and Cardinal Sforza to conspire to repay Gonzaga's cruel plot. Lucrezia travels to Naples accompanied by her husband, with Micheletto offering protection. King Ferdinand remains steadfast in his determination that little Giovanni will not be recognised at court. Upon learning this, Lucrezia plots to poison him, but Micheletto takes on the task.
25	6	"Relics"	Kari Skogland	Guy Burt	May 19, 2013	0.663
Cesare lands in northern Italy with a French army. Alexander is unhappy with what he perceives as a challenge by his son to his authority. Together they plot to use the French army to destroy the Sforza dynasty. Catherina, meanwhile, has come up with a plot of her own – biological warfare sent directly to the Vatican. Concerned about the lack of funds for his Crusade, Alexander imposes punitive taxes on the newly arrived Jewish community. They offer instead the Spear of Longinus.
26	7	"Lucrezia's Gambit"	David Leland	Neil Jordan	May 26, 2013	0.421
Cesare burns Cardinal Constanzo's palace in order to contain the plague. Lucrezia, aware that with the death of King Ferdinand of Naples, Alfonso's cousins Prince Raphael and Prince Frederigo are both claimants to the throne of Naples before her husband. As such, she blackmails one of the princes to forgo the Crown of Naples, seeking the lesser of two evils so she may keep her child with her. Cesare and Micheletto solve the problem of Catarina Sforza's son being alive. Micheletto meets a stranger calling himself Pascal.
27	8	"Tears of Blood"	David Leland	Neil Jordan	June 2, 2013	0.804
Micheletto discovers that his lover is a spy and works with Cesare to discover for whom. As pilgrims travel to Rome for the Jubilee year celebration, Caterina Sforza devises a fake miracle to divert them (and their gold) from their pilgrimage, thus endangering Alexander's attempt to replenish the Vatican's coffers. When Cesare and Micheletto arrive to investigate, she attempts to have Cesare killed. At the King of Naples' investiture in Rome, Lucrezia is named the Vatican's ambassador to his court, but soon discovers that she is under the constant surveillance of Neapolitan guards. Meanwhile, Alexander and Mattai work together to prosecute the pope's promised Crusade against the Turks.
28	9	"The Gunpowder Plot"	Neil Jordan	Neil Jordan	June 9, 2013	0.611
Devastated by his betrayal, Micheletto kills his lover and disappears. Cesare races to Naples to rescue Lucrezia. Brother and sister are eventually reunited and are so overjoyed to see one another that Alfonso begins to suspect that their relationship seems more than that of ordinary siblings. Alexander schemes to corner the market in Italian sulfur – the key ingredient to gunpowder.
29	10	"The Prince"	Neil Jordan	Neil Jordan	June 16, 2013	0.528
Alexander and Cesare are reconciled at last. The Papal Armies have been fortified with the money saved from the Crusade and the proceeds of the Jubilee. Cesare marches his fearsome army to finish what Juan started – lay siege to Forlì. While preparing his attack, Micheletto reappears, in his tent, to inform him of a forgotten Roman mine beneath the wall, and, with this information, Cesare's army fire a barrage of cannonballs at the point where the tunnel meets the wall, causing it to cave in, and the wall to fall. Cesare and his army manage to seize control of the city with few losses. Deciding she would rather die than surrender, Caterina Sforza attempts to hang herself, but one of Cesare's lieutenants fires his rifle at the rope, and she is taken prisoner. Cesare, wanting to show off Caterina as the legend he believes she truly is, then has an extravagant cage prepared to transport her to Rome, and Castel Sant'Angelo in Rome is prepared to serve as her prison. Following a scuffle with Cesare, a drunken Alfonso is near death and Lucrezia turns to her potions to end his life painlessly. Cesare vows that Lucrezia will now be his for good.

== Reception ==
The show's first season received generally favorable reviews in the United States, scoring 66 out of 100 based on 25 critics on Metacritic. Robert Bianco of USA Today said, "... seen from a safe distance, captured by a sterling cast led in marvelous high style by Jeremy Irons, and presented with all the brio, flair and sumptuous design TV can muster, the infamous family is almost addictively entertaining". Linda Stasi of the New York Post gave the season a 3.5/4 rating, remarking "'The Borgias' (the series) makes The Tudors look like a bunch of amateurs with bigger lips."

However, it was met with a more mixed reception in the United Kingdom. Rachel Ray of The Daily Telegraph called Irons' performance "disappointingly undiabolical". She added that the show is "for history buffs, not for viewers looking for another Godfather". Sarah Dempster of The Guardian mocked the show's dialogue and visual style: "The ridiculousness mounts. The opening double bill features impromptu palazzo brawls between priapic gadabouts in bejewelled codpieces ("Back to Spain, Borgia!") and flocks of miffed cardinals gliding along darkened corridors like motorised pepperpots". Sam Wollaston recalled the 1981 BBC miniseries of the same name, which had been widely panned, and said there was "more thought to this [2011] version, and attention to character. And Irons is proper". The Independent's Holly Williams praised Irons, but said elsewhere, "the acting and script feel about as substantial as a communion wafer. With power struggles, sex, assassinations and sibling rivalries, it should, at least, be racy and fun. Yet the storyline often feels curiously ungripping".

The second season's premiere was met with much more positive reviews, and holds a Metacritic score of 81/100, based on six reviews. Curt Wagner of RedEye has stated, "Based on the first four episodes of the new season, I'd say Jordan has figured things out. The Borgias still overflows with delicious intrigues, sex and deadly politics, but it now has an energy and constant forward momentum the first season lacked." Tim Goodman of The Hollywood Reporter has stated, "Borgias retains the intrigue and conniving family politics that made season one such a pleasure ride, but it all has more snap now, with Jordan spinning the plates with aplomb."

=== Awards and nominations ===
The Borgias garnered 16 Emmy nominations throughout its run, and won three: twice for Outstanding Costumes for a Series (2011 & 2013) and once for Outstanding Original Main Title Theme Music (2011). The excellence of the costume design on the series was further recognized by the Costume Designers Guild, which twice nominated The Borgias for the Excellence in Period/Fantasy Television award (2011 & 2013).

Jeremy Irons was nominated for the Golden Globe Award for Best Actor – Television Series Drama in 2012.
