= Borgia (TV series) =

French-German-Czech-Italian historical drama television series

- Genre: Historical fiction; Transgressive fiction
- Created by: Tom Fontana
- Starring: John Doman; Mark Ryder; Stanley Weber; Isolda Dychauk; Marta Gastini; Diarmuid Noyes; Art Malik; Assumpta Serna; Christian McKay; Dejan Čukić; Scott Winters
- Composers: Cyril Morin (s. 1); Éric Neveux (s. 2–3)
- Countries of origin: France; Germany; Czech Republic; Italy
- Original language: English
- No. of seasons: 3
- No. of episodes: 38

Production
- Executive producers: Tom Fontana; Barry Levinson; Takis Candilis; Klaus Zimmermann; Ferdinand Dohna; Anne Thomopoulos; Steven Bawol; Olivier Bibas
- Producers: Michael Schwarz; Petr Moravec; Katerina Silna; Rick McCallum; Brant Englestein
- Production locations: Czech Republic; Italy
- Cinematography: Ousama Rawi (s. 1–2); James Welland (s. 3)
- Running time: 52 minutes

Original release
- Network: Canal+ (France); ZDF (Germany); ORF 2 (Austria); Sky Cinema 1 (Italy, s. 1–2); Sky Atlantic (Italy, s. 3)
- Release: 10 July 2011 – 27 October 2014

Borgia is a historical drama television series created by Tom Fontana for Canal+, ZDF, ORF, and Sky Italia. The show recounts the Borgia family's rise to power and subsequent domination of the Papal States during the Renaissance.

Borgia debuted in Italy on Sky Cinema 1 on 10 July 2011. It was since renewed for a second season, which premiered in France on Canal+ on 18 March 2013. A third and final season premiered in France on Canal+ on 15 September 2014. The series finale aired in France on Canal+ on 27 October 2014 as the 38th episode overall.

== Production ==
The series is produced by Atlantique Productions, a subsidiary of Lagardère Entertainment, for French premium-pay TV Canal+ in association with EOS Entertainment, and was filmed in the Czech Republic and Italy. Czech production was held by company Etic films. International distribution is handled by Beta Film GmbH. Season 3 was filmed between 27 May 2013 and 27 January 2014.

=== International production ===
The show was a French-German-Czech-Italian production, and the cast and crew represented a range of other nationalities as well. Series creator, producer, and lead writer Tom Fontana was American, as were writers Sean Whitesell, Gina Gionfriddo, and Larry Cohen. Season 2 saw French writer Audrey Fouché join the writing team.

The directors came from several different parts of Europe: Oliver Hirschbiegel and Christoph Schrewe are German, Dearbhla Walsh is Irish, Metin Hüseyin is British, and Thomas Vincent is French. Each director would handle at least two consecutive episodes before handing the series over to the next.

Main character Rodrigo Borgia was portrayed by American actor John Doman. The rest of the cast hailed from the United Kingdom, France, Germany, Italy, the Czech Republic, Ireland, Denmark, Spain, and several other countries.

== Cast and characters ==
=== Main ===
- John Doman as Cardinal Rodrigo Borgia / Pope Alexander VI
- Mark Ryder as Cesare Borgia
- Stanley Weber as Juan Borgia and Francesco Borgia (Season 1, guest seasons 2–3)
- Isolda Dychauk as Lucrezia Borgia
- Marta Gastini as Giulia Farnese
- Diarmuid Noyes as Cardinal Alessandro Farnese
- Art Malik as Francesc Gacet, Rodrigo Borgia's secretary
- Assumpta Serna as Vannozza Cattanei
- Christian McKay as Cardinal Ascanio Sforza (seasons 1–2)
- Scott Winters as Cardinal Raffaele Riario-Sansoni
- Dejan Čukić as Cardinal Giuliano della Rovere / Pope Julius II

=== Recurring ===
- Victor Schefé as Johann Burchard
- Paul Brennen as Agapito Geraldini, Cesare's secretary
- Andrea Sawatzki as Adriana de Mila, Lucrezia's governess
- Michael Fitzgerald as Cardinal Oliviero Carafa
- Miroslav Táborský as Cardinal Giambattista Orsini
- Alejandro Albarracín as Alfonso di Calabria
- Sean Campion as Virginio Orsini
- Karel Dobrý as Cardinal Giovanni Colonna
- Andrew Hawley as Alfonso d'Este
- Predrag Bjelac as Cardinal Francesco Piccolomini
- Nicolás Belmonte as Shahzadeh Djem
- Adam Misík as Goffredo Borgia
- Raimund Wallisch as Alfonso II of Naples
- Richard Southgate as Marcantonio Colonna
- Marc Duret as Cardinal Guillaume Briçonnet
- Petr Vaněk as Miguel de Corella
- Sebastian Urzendowsky as Cardinal Juan Borgia Lanzol
- Manuel Rubey as Giovanni Sforza
- John Bradley West as Giovanni de' Medici
- Josef Jelínek as Cardinal Federico Sanseverino
- Tereza Voříšková as Fiametta Michaelis, Cesare's lover
- Josef Badalec as Cardinal Pedro Luis Borgia Lanzol
- Joseph Beattie as King Louis XII of France
- Paloma Bloyd as Princess Carlotta d'Aragona
- Rafael Cebrián as Rodrigo Borgia Lanzol, 'el pequeño'
- Matt Di Angelo as Cardinal Francesco Alidosi
- Peter Hosking as Cardinal Giovanni Battista Savelli
- Babsie Steger as Giovanna Farnese

=== Guest starring ===
- Tom Wlaschiha as Philip of Habsburg
- Vadim Glowna as Cardinal Jorge da Costa
- Mónica Lopera as Maria Enriquez de Luna
- Jiří Mádl as Francesco Remolino d'Ilerda
- Eliska Křenková as Sancia of Squillace
- Scott Cleverdon as Gonzalo Fernández de Córdoba
- Davide Lipari as Sigismondo d'Este
- Alexandra Oppo as Isabella d'Este
- César Domboy as Guy de Laval
- Bohdan Petrovic Esek as Cardinal Francesco Borgia
- Michael Billington as Orsino Orsini Migliorati
- Udo Kier as Pope Innocent VIII
- Dave Legeno as Guidobaldo da Montefeltro
- Jiří Ornest as Cardinal Ardicino della Porta
- Marek Vašut as Fabrizio Colonna
- Amber Rose Revah as Maacah bat Talmai, Juan's lover
- Simon Larvaron as King Charles VIII of France
- David Atrakchi as Yves D'Allegre, French captain
- Marco Cassini as Pietro Bembo
- Antoine Cholet as Cardinal Georges D'Amboise
- Thibaut Evrard as Niccolò Machiavelli
- Josef Karas as Domenico Doria, Papal Guard commander
- Valentina Cervi as Caterina Sforza
- Iain Glen as Girolamo Savonarola
- Richard McCabe as King Frederick IV of Naples
- Daisy Lewis as Maria Diaz Garlon, Cesare's lover
- Rudolf Martin as Franceschetto Cybo
- Javier Godino as Dionigi di Naldo
- Paul Hamy as Simon d'Auxerre
- Lorenzo Richelmy as Sidonius Grimani
- Luka Peroš as Imola man
- Ellie Darcey-Alden as Felice della Rovere

== Episodes ==
=== Season 1 – Borgia: Faith and Fear (2011) ===
(March 1492 – June 1493)

No. in series	No. in season	Title	Directed by	Written by	Original air date			
No. in series	No. in season	Title	Directed by	Written by	Italy (Sky Cinema 1)	France (Canal+)	Austria (ORF 2)	Germany (ZDF)
1	1	1492	Oliver Hirschbiegel	Tom Fontana	10 July 2011	10 October 2011	13 October 2011	17 October 2011
In Pisa, Cesare whips himself for his sins. In Rome, before the College of Cardinals Rodrigo asks the pope to name Queen Isabella and King Ferdinand of Spain as most Catholic majesties. He succeeds, angering Giuliano della Rovere, who had wanted the honor to go to France. Juan brings news of Pedro Luis's death. Rodrigo takes Lucrezia to live with him. Rodrigo sends Juan to speak with Orsini and Cesare with Colonna. Cesare fails, so Juan is named second duke of Gandia. Juan has sex with Fabrizio Colonna's wife. Fabrizio beats Juan and kills his wife. Rodrigo asks the pope to name Cesare as archbishop of Valencia. Juan and Cesare confront Marcantonio Colonna. Cesare is named as archbishop of Valencia. During a fight with Marcantonio, Cesare cuts his finger. Rodrigo tell his nephews the pope is ill.
2	2	Ondata di calore	Oliver Hirschbiegel	Story by: Tom Fontana; Teleplay by: Kyle Bradstreet & Brant Englestein	10 July 2011	10 October 2011	13 October 2011	17 October 2011
Cesare and Alessandro visit a witch. She predicts that he will not die soon, but five will before summer. Ottoman prince Djem comes to Rome and gives the lance of Longinus to the Pope. Goffredo asks Lucrezia to visit their family, who are sick, but she declines. Lorenzo de Medici dies. Juan and Cesare uncover a plot to kill the Pope and Djem. The Pope becomes seriously ill. Rodrigo tries to prolong Pope's life to reverse his will. Cesare brings the witch to heal his family. Ottaviano dies so he kills her. Juan takes credit for foiling the assassinations and publicly kills the assassin. Juan discovers Franceschetto Cybo's conspiracy, and the will is reversed. The pope dies, and peasants unleash chaos through the city.
3	3	A Sacred Vow	Oliver Hirschbiegel	Story by: Tom Fontana; Teleplay by: Frank Pugliese & Brant Englestein	9 September 2011	17 October 2011	14 October 2011	19 October 2011
After the chaos, Rodrigo sends Juan to Spain, Cesare to Pisa, and Lucrezia to Subiaco. Giuliano and Rodrigo select the cardinals for the nine requiem masses. Lucrezia gets sick. Cesare visits his lover Fiametta, who gives birth to his son. Vannozza visits her daughter. The election begins, Giuliano through Piccolomini reveals through a letter about Rodrigo attending an orgy. In revenge, Rodrigo reveals a letter through Sanseverino about Giuliano with French money trying to buy the election. Both are tied for last place. Cesare sacrifices his son for Rodrigo to be pope.
4	4	Wisdom of the Holy Spirit	Oliver Hirschbiegel	Story by: Tom Fontana; Teleplay by: Brant Englestein & Frank Pugliese	9 September 2011	17 October 2011	14 October 2011	19 October 2011
Fiametta beats Cesare for sacrificing their son. Lucrezia becomes possessed. Rodrigo tries to bribe cardinals with properties. All except Oliviero Carafa accept. Rafael Riario agrees to vote for Rodrigo. Fearing defeat, Carafe asks King Ferrante to stop the election by force. Naples attacks Rome, but the election goes on. After defeat, Carafa asks everyone to vote for Ascanio Sforza. Vannozza escapes with Lucrezia to Rome. Ascanio leads the election. Rodrigo threatens Ascanio about revealing his heritage, and Ascanio agrees to vote for him in exchange for Lucrezia's marriage to Giovanni Sforza and him being vice chancellor. Cesare searches for his son but can't find him. Rodrigo wins the election and becomes Pope Alexander VI.
5	5	The Bonds of Matrimony	Dearbhla Walsh	Story by: Tom Fontana; Teleplay by: Gina Gionfriddo	16 September 2011	24 October 2011	19 October 2011	20 October 2011
Cesare and Alessandro reach Spoleto. Rodrigo is crowned Pope, and he promises to build a new basilica. Giulia Farnese seduces Rodrigo to appoint Alessandro as cardinal. Alessandro tells Cesare that he is to be named a cardinal. Cesare asks him to be his spy in the Vatican. Rodrigo tries to reform the Church. Lucrezia and Giovanni are married in proxy. Rodrigo names Juan captain general of the papal guard. Cesare, due to his guilt, tries to commit suicide. Vannozza informs Cesare about a conspiracy to depose the Pope. Rodrigo hosts a banquet for Lucrezia's marriage. Alessandro meets Silvia and tells her why he saved Cesare's son. Rodrigo refuses Lucrezia to be with Giovanni. Cesare decides to visit Rome and tell the Pope about the conspiracy.
6	6	Legitimacy	Dearbhla Walsh	Story by: Tom Fontana; Teleplay by: Bradford Winters	16 September 2011	24 October 2011	19 October 2011	20 October 2011
The Treaty of Tordesillas is signed in favor of Spain in exchange for Juan's marriage to Maria Enriquez de Luna. Cesare visits the Vatican to tell about the conspiracy to Rodrigo. A Holy League is formed against the conspirators. Prince Alfonso of Naples asks Cesare to be married to Sancia, but the Pope agrees to marry Goffredo to her instead. Vannozza visits Rodrigo regarding Cesare, and to reveal to him that he is his father. Vannozza asks help from Giulia to eliminate Adriana. Giulia is attacked and her face is scarred. Cesare and Alessandro are named cardinals, and Giulia arranges for Lucrezia to meet with Giovanni. Rodrigo acknowledges Cesare, Juan, Lucrezia, and Goffredo as his children. Giulia tells Rodrigo she is pregnant with his child.
7	7	Maneuvers	Metin Hüseyin	Story by: Tom Fontana; Teleplay by: Andrea Ciannavei	23 September 2011	31 October 2011	21 October 2011	24 October 2011
King Ferrante is dead and who should succeed him king Charles VIII of France or Alfonso of Naples is discussed. Rodrigo decides to verify himself to announce the successor. Giuliano warns that Charles will invade Italy for Naples. Maria Enriquez de Luna comes to Rome. Cesare visits Orvieto and helps Alessandro to better its defences, for the work Rodrigo names Cesare governor of Orvieto which makes Alessandro jealous who confronts Cesare. Rodrigo orders Juan and Guidabaldo to seize and capture Ostia from Giuliano which they do. Lucrezia discovers Giovanni is impotent and engages with Alfonso d'Este. Rodrigo finds from a peasant that Orsino attacked Giulia. Rodrigo orders Juan to capture Orsinis in Bracciano, due to Juan's mistake they lose many men and are defeated. Cesare is not made governor of Orvieto due to Giulia. Juan reveals to Rodrigo his wife is pregnant. Adriana is arrested for helping Orsino. Cesare crowns Alfonso as King of Naples in Pope's place and with Juan attends marriage of Goffredo and Sancia. Juan has sex with Sancia. Miguel de Corella assassinates Orsino Orsini.
8	8	Prelude to an Apocalypse	Metin Hüseyin	Story by: Tom Fontana; Teleplay by: Thomas Kelly	23 September 2011	31 October 2011	21 October 2011	24 October 2011
The Borgias prepare for battle. Giulia appoints Pantisilea as Lucrezia's lady-in-waiting to spy for her. Alfonso d'Este leaves for Ferrara. Lucrezia demands divorce for her, Rodrigo declines. Juan and Cesare recruit the Germans for their army, they favour Cesare over Juan. Rodrigo excommunicates Marcantonio. Rodrigo looks for help from Emperor Maximilian and King Ferdinand. Cesare and Alessandro reconcile. Rodrigo sends Cesare to Marcantonio in exchange for Colonna joining him, where Marcantonio rapes him. Lucrezia tries to poison Giovanni but later changes her mind. Giulia is captured by the French army, so Rodrigo orders the arrest of the Orsini and Colonna and then she is released. The Neapolitan army is defeated by the French. Juan's mercenaries desert him.
9	9	The Invasion of Rome	Christoph Schrewe	Story by: Tom Fontana; Teleplay by: Sean Whitesell	30 September 2011	7 November 2011	24 October 2011	26 October 2011
Rome gets ready for the French army. Rodrigo shifts the cardinals, his family and the refugees to Castel Sant'Angelo. Giulia gives birth to Laura. Rodrigo decides to let King Charles free passage through Rome in exchange for Cesare's release, Marcantonio releases Cesare. The French army invades Rome and Charles reaches the Vatican, Cesare escapes them and reaches Castel Sant'Angelo. During the chaos Jean Briconnet rapes Vannozza. Rodrigo sends Cesare to speak with Charles, Charles demands Djem and surrender of the fortress, Cesare convinces him not to depose the Pope. Rodrigo meets with Charles to discuss and both agree to each other's conditions. Cesare kills Jean Briconnet. Juan returns and Cesare confronts him for his cowardice. Rodrigo grants Charles the title “The most Christian King", Charles demands the pope to crown him in Naples, he refuses so he asks for Cesare; Rodrigo is forced to agree. Juan mocks Cesare and gets beaten by him. Rodrigo learns of Cesare's suffering. The French army with Cesare leave for Naples. King Ferdinand agrees to go to war with Charles if the pope issues a papal bull to make Francisco de Cisneros to be Cardinal, Rodrigo agrees. Rodrigo sends the cardinals to major city-states in Italy to form a holy league to defend Italy from Charles.
10	10	Miracles	Christoph Schrewe	Story by: Tom Fontana; Teleplay by: James Yoshimura	30 September 2011	7 November 2011	24 October 2011	26 October 2011
In Velletri, Djem becomes ill and dies, Cesare uses the situation to set fire to the French army's munitions and escape. Emperor Maximilian sends his army to conquer Venice for himself, Rodrigo uses this to his advantage to make Venice join the Holy league. Maria Enriquez de Luna reveals to Lucrezia about Juan's abuses so she sends Maria to Spain in secret. French captain Yves D'Allegre enquires Rodrigo about Cesare and reveals that he had sex with Giulia, Rodrigo becomes angry and asks her to make it right, and Giulia does by killing Yves. Queen Isabella asks the Pope to rid Rome of Jews, Rodrigo agrees to do it only after the Spanish defeat the French. Juan confronts Lucrezia regarding Maria. Rodrigo with Giulia goes to Orvieto leaving Juan and Lucrezia to meet with Charles, who speak with Charles and make him leave Rome. Rodrigo meets Cesare in Orvieto, from there goes with him to Perugia. In Perugia Rodrigo meets Sister Columba, a miracle worker. Rodrigo asks her about his future, she didn't tell him anything and faints. Juan seduces Rosalina and has sex with her, after knowing the truth, she commits suicide. In Battle of Fornovo the holy league defeats the French and take their treasure. In Naples French surrender to Spanish general Cordova. Lucrezia meets with Alfonso who is struck with French disease, disgusted with Rodrigo and Alfonso, Lucrezia enters a convent.
11	11	God's Monster	Metin Hüseyin	Story by: Tom Fontana; Teleplay by: Kevin Deiboldt	7 October 2011	14 November 2011	25 October 2011	27 October 2011
After the French army's defeat, Carafa asks the Pope to invest Federigo d'Aragona as the new King of Naples. Pope suggests Juan as the new king, which many do not agree. Lucrezia witnesses Sister Lucia and her miraculous wounds. General Cordova and Guidabaldo meet the pope, Cordova asks the Pope to rid Rome of Jews as agreed by the Pope. Rodrigo meets Pedro Caldes and asks him to speak to Lucrezia and bring her back to him. Lucrezia dismisses Pedro, Juan confronts Lucrezia and tells her Maria died giving birth to twins, later Pedro wins her over and the two have sex, Pedro brings her to Rodrigo. Juan asks Giovanni de Medici's help in the conversion of Jews in Rome. Cesare discovers that Juan killed Pedro Luis. Pantisiliea comes to Vannozza and tells her the truth that she was spying Lucrezia for Giulia. Juan orders Miguel de Corella to Kill Cesare. Corella does not kill Cesare but wills to serve him instead of Juan, Cesare asks him to reveal how Juan killed Pedro Luis and he does. Rodrigo orders Cordovo, Guidabaldo and Juan to capture the Orsini and Colonna, They capture Marcantonio Colonna but fail to capture Virginio Orsini. Alessandro reveals to Cesare that Silvia is pregnant. Corella assassinates Marcantonio. Cesare learns that his son is alive and Alessandro saved him. The leaders of the city-states of Italy and King Ferdinand approve Federigo as the King of Naples rather than Juan, Rodrigo is forced to agree. Cesare tells Alessandro he knows the truth about his son and beats him up.
12	12	The Serpent Rises	Metin Hüseyin	Tom Fontana	7 October 2011	14 November 2011	25 October 2011	27 October 2011
Near the Colosseo, Rodrigo discovers a relic from ancient Rome, The Statue of Laocoön and His Sons. Goffredo and Sancia visit Rome, Rodrigo announces Sancia is pregnant and he also longs to see his grandchildren in Spain. Rodrigo appoints Carafa as Dean of the sacred college and renews Rafael Riario's tenure as Camerlengo of Holy Roman church. General Cordova and Guidabaldo bring the captured Virginio Orsini before the pope, Rodrigo appoints Juan to decide his punishment. Vannozza reveals to Lucrezia about Pantisiliea spying on her for Giulia. Juan confronts Corella asking why has he not yet killed Cesare. At dinner, a fight between Cesare and Juan escalates which leads to both of them fighting in the streets. The next day Cesare wakes up with Pantisiliea not knowing what happened the day before as he was drunk. General Cordova is presented with the Golden Rose of Rome for his services. Juan's horse comes to Vatican without him, with its stirrups cut. Cesare finds Juan's body in the Tiber river with multiple stab wounds and his money intact, leading him to believe he was murdered not for his money, he quickly informs Rodrigo, who struck with grief locks himself in his room refusing to come out. Cesare and Rafael Riario begin an investigation to find Juan's killer. They first investigate Ascanio Sforza who admits he set up a meeting with Rosalina's father, fiancé and Juan but denies killing him. Next they speak with Giambattista Orsini who tells them Juan asked bribe for releasing Virginio, Virginio refuses to apologize to Juan, but he also says he did not kill Juan. Giovanni and Fabrizio Colonna also admits not killing Juan. The investigation comes to a standstill. Cesare brings Rodrigo out of his room. Rodrigo returns a changed man, he decides to send Cesare to Valencia, and Lucrezia to Spain to look after Juan's children; both refuse. He sends Giulia away and allows Giuliano back into the college of cardinals. Cesare goes to Lucrezia, she reveals to him after their fight Juan visited her and told her that he had Pedro Luis and Maria killed, In anger Lucrezia stabs him repeatedly and Pedro Caldes slits his throat, Lucrezia and Cesare try to have sex but after he finds Pedro Caldes in the room, Cesare chases him followed by Lucrezia. In front of the college of cardinals Cesare kills Pedro Caldes with the Lance of Longinus. Many rumours circulate around Rome about why Cesare killed Pedro. Pantisiliea's body is found in the Tiber with whip marks. Rodrigo damages the statue of Laocoön and His Sons in regret and asks forgiveness before god for his sins.

=== Season 2 – Borgia: Rules of Love, Rules of War (2013) ===
(February 1494 – September 1494)

No. in series	No. in season	Title	Directed by	Written by	Original air date			
No. in series	No. in season	Title	Directed by	Written by	Italy (Sky Cinema 1)	France (Canal+)	Austria (ORF 2)	Germany (ZDF)
13	1	The Time of Sweet Desires	Dearbhla Walsh	Tom Fontana	13 September 2013	18 March 2013	25 September 2013	30 September 2013
14	2	Ash Wednesday	Dearbhla Walsh	Story by: Tom Fontana; Teleplay by: Brant Englestein	13 September 2013	18 March 2013	25 September 2013	30 September 2013
15	3	Palm Sunday	Christoph Schrewe	Story by: Tom Fontana; Teleplay by: Bradford Winters	20 September 2013	25 March 2013	27 September 2013	1 October 2013
16	4	Pax Vobiscum	Christoph Schrewe	Story by: Tom Fontana; Teleplay by: Andrea Ciannavei	20 September 2013	25 March 2013	27 September 2013	1 October 2013
17	5	Ascension	Metin Hüseyin	Story by: Tom Fontana; Teleplay by: Sean Whitesell	27 September 2013	1 April 2013	1 October 2013	3 October 2013
18	6	Pentecost	Metin Hüseyin	Story by: Tom Fontana; Teleplay by: Larry J. Cohen	27 September 2013	1 April 2013	1 October 2013	3 October 2013
19	7	The Blessed Trinity	Thomas Vincent	Story by: Tom Fontana; Teleplay by: Brant Englestein	4 October 2013	8 April 2013	2 October 2013	7 October 2013
20	8	A Morality Play	Thomas Vincent	Story by: Tom Fontana; Teleplay by: Chris Albers	4 October 2013	8 April 2013	2 October 2013	7 October 2013
21	9	Transfiguration	Metin Hüseyin	Story by: Tom Fontana; Teleplay by: Susanna Styron	11 October 2013	15 April 2013	3 October 2013	9 October 2013
22	10	The Assumption	Metin Hüseyin	Story by: Tom Fontana; Teleplay by: Frank Pugliese	11 October 2013	15 April 2013	3 October 2013	9 October 2013
23	11	The Seven Sorrows	Christoph Schrewe	Story by: Tom Fontana; Teleplay by: Audrey Fouché	18 October 2013	22 April 2013	7 October 2013	13 October 2013
24	12	Who Is Like God?	Christoph Schrewe	Teleplay by: Tom Fontana	18 October 2013	22 April 2013	7 October 2013	13 October 2013

=== Season 3 – Borgia: Triumph and Oblivion (2014) ===
(1495 – 1507)

No. in series	No. in season	Title	Directed by	Written by	Original air date			
No. in series	No. in season	Title	Directed by	Written by	Italy (Sky Atlantic)	France (Canal+)	Austria (ORF 2)	Germany (ZDF)
25	1	1495	Christoph Schrewe	Story and Teleplay by: Tom Fontana & Brant Englestein	3 November 2014	15 September 2014	...	...
26	2	1496	Christoph Schrewe	Story by: Tom Fontana; Teleplay by: Larry J. Cohen	3 November 2014	15 September 2014	...	...
27	3	1497	Christoph Schrewe	Story by: Tom Fontana; Teleplay by: Audrey Fouché	10 November 2014	22 September 2014	...	...
28	4	1498	Metin Hüseyin	Story by: Tom Fontana; Teleplay by: Andrea Ciannavei	10 November 2014	22 September 2014	...	...
29	5	1499	Metin Hüseyin	Story by: Tom Fontana; Teleplay by: Susanna Styron	17 November 2014	29 September 2014	...	...
30	6	1500	Metin Hüseyin	Story by: Tom Fontana; Teleplay by: William Bromell	17 November 2014	29 September 2014	...	...
31	7	1501	Athina Rachel Tsangari	Story by: Tom Fontana; Teleplay by: Larry J. Cohen	24 November 2014	6 October 2014	...	...
32	8	1502	Athina Rachel Tsangari	Story by: Tom Fontana; Teleplay by: Frank Pugliese	24 November 2014	6 October 2014	...	...
33	9	1503, Part One	Metin Hüseyin	Story by: Tom Fontana; Teleplay by: Chris Albers	1 December 2014	13 October 2014	...	...
34	10	1503, Part Two	Metin Hüseyin	Story by: Tom Fontana; Teleplay by: Marie Roussin	1 December 2014	13 October 2014	...	...
35	11	1504	Metin Hüseyin	Story by: Brant Englestein	8 December 2014	20 October 2014	...	...
36	12	1505	Christoph Schrewe	Story and Teleplay by: Brant Englestein & Tom Fontana	8 December 2014	20 October 2014	...	...
37	13	1506	Christoph Schrewe	Story and Teleplay by: Tom Fontana & Brant Englestein	15 December 2014	27 October 2014	...	...
38	14	1507	Christoph Schrewe	Story and Teleplay by: Tom Fontana	15 December 2014	27 October 2014	...	...

The third season premiered on Netflix on 1 November 2014.

== See also ==
- 2011 in Italian television
- Television in Italy
- 2013 in French television
- Television in France
