= Sancha of Aragon, Princess of Squillace =

Princess of Squillace (1478–1506)

Sancha of Aragon
- Princess of Squillace
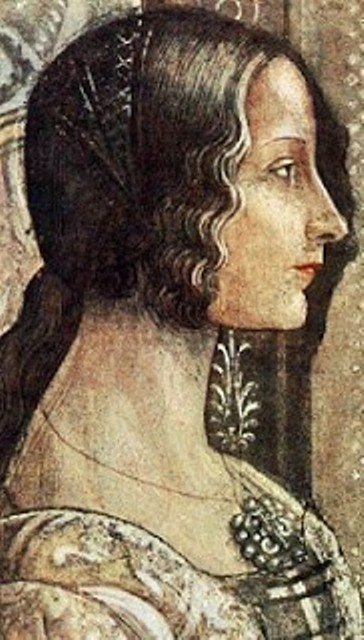
- A supposed depiction of Sancha, 1485–1490; painted by Domenico Ghirlandaio
- Born: 1478; Gaeta, Kingdom of Naples
- Died: 1506 (aged 27–28); Naples
- Spouses: Onorato III Caetani (m. 1487; ann. 1493) Gioffre Borgia (m. 1493)
- House: Trastámara
- Father: Alfonso II of Naples
- Mother: Trogia Gazzella

Sancha of Aragon (Note: Spanish: Sancha de Aragón [ˈsantʃa de aɾaˈɡon]) (1478–1506) was an Italian noblewoman and the first wife of Gioffre Borgia, the youngest legitimized son of Pope Alexander VI and his chief mistress, Vannozza dei Cattanei.

== Life ==
=== Early years and first marriage ===
Sancha was born in 1478 in Gaeta, Lazio, the eldest illegitimate child of Trogia Gazzella and Duke Alfonso of Calabria, who briefly reigned as the King of Naples from 1494 until his abdication in 1495. She was born three years before her only sibling, Alfonso of Aragon. At the time of her conception, her father had been married to Ippolita Maria Sforza since 1465. Her paternal grandparents were King Ferrante I and his wife, Queen Isabella of Clermont.

Sancha was betrothed to Onorato III Caetani on 6 May 1487, at the age of nine. By September 1493, the already finalized contract had been annulled by her father to instead facilitate a strategic alliance with the papacy and secure formal papal recognition of his claim to the Neapolitan throne.

=== Princess of Squillace (1493–1506) ===
==== Wedding and festivities ====
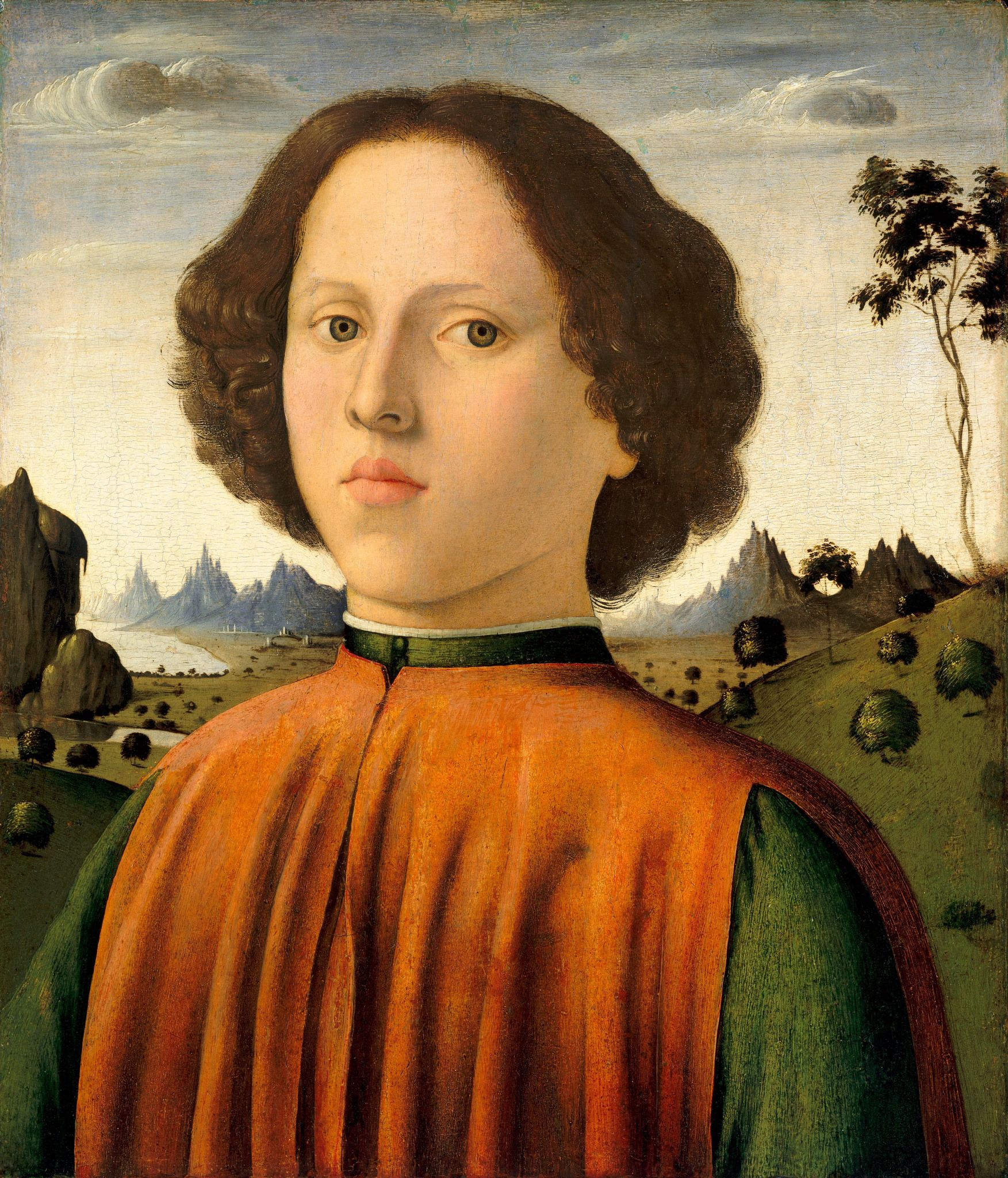
Her husband Gioffre

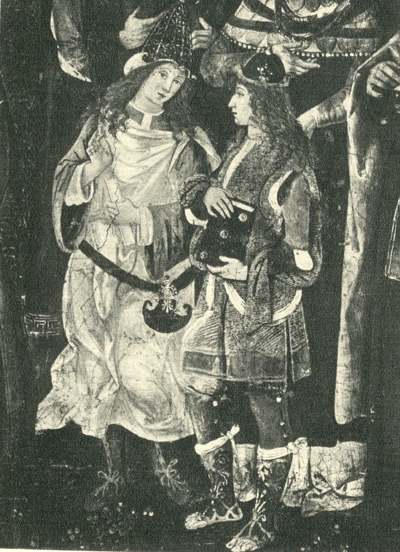
Sancha and Gioffre illustrated by Pinturicchio, Borgia Apartments

To consolidate diplomatic ties between the Holy See and Naples, Gioffre Borgia, an acknowledged son of the pontiff, contracted a strategic marriage with Sancha. Because her bridegroom was yet to reach marriageable age, the engagement was not confirmed until Christmas. The couple was married by proxy at the Vatican on 16 August 1493. Their nuptials and the exchange of gifts took place in her homeland on 7 May 1494, coinciding with the coronation of Alfonso II as the Neapolitan monarch. At that time, Gioffre was thirteen years old, while Sancha was sixteen. She received rubies, diamonds, pearl necklaces, silk, and gold brocades. As part of her dowry, her father conferred the Principality of Squillace and the County of Alvito to the Borgias, both of which were feudal territories in Southern Italy.

The nominal rulers of Squillace were expected to immediately relocate to Rome following the reception, as per the request of the Pope. However, in light of French efforts to militarily annex the Kingdom of Naples, they opted to postpone their move and temporarily reside in their fiefdom for three days. Finally, the spouses were able to leave and set foot in the capital city via the Lateran Gate, accompanied by a retinue of ladies, pages and ambassadors on 10 May. Sancha was welcomed by the Lady of Pesaro, Lucrezia Borgia, who courteously kissed both her brother and new sister-in-law.

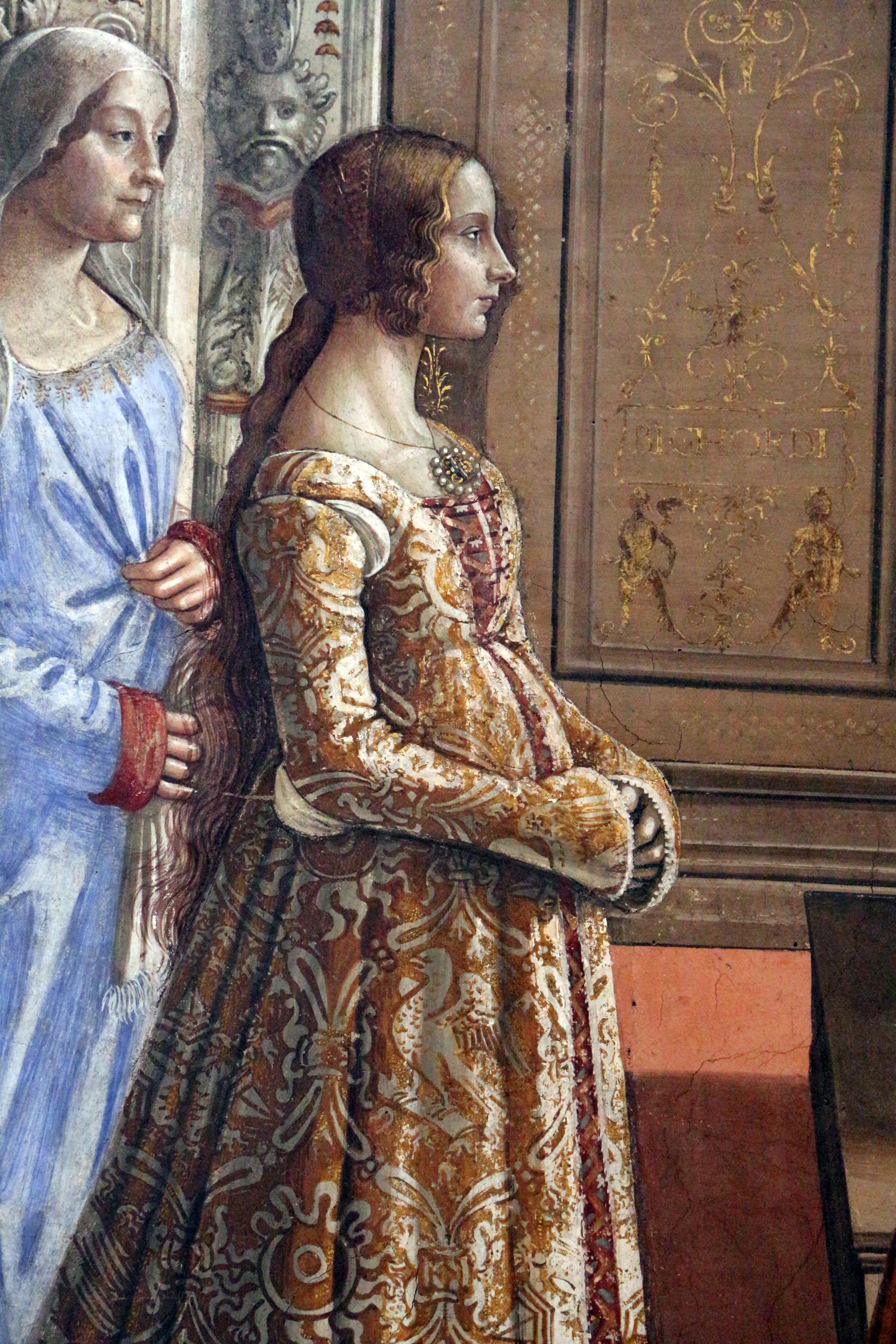
Detail from the Birth of Mary, purported to portray Sancha

On 11 May, the bishop of Gravina in Puglia officiated the religious ceremony in the chapel of Castel Nuovo. Following a banquet, the newlyweds consummated their union, in which her father and Cardinal Juan Borgia participated as witnesses. Pope Alexander VI enthusiastically informed his son, Giovanni, that Gioffre had successfully bedded his wife, the "illustrious" Donna Sancha of Aragon.

==== Reputation ====
The Princess of Squillace was noted for her sensual beauty at the Vatican court, but her fiery disposition drew negative attention. The Mantuan diplomat, Gian Carlo Scalona, described Sancha as less beautiful than Lucrezia—naturally dark in complexion, with glancing eyes and an aquiline nose, yet very well-proportioned. As early as June, a high-ranking official composed a sworn statement defending her name from early scandal, testifying that her household was being properly managed and that no men were allowed in her private bedchambers. Her husband was too inexperienced and young to satisfy Sancha; between autumn 1496 and spring 1497, she began an affair with his eldest brother, the womanizing Cesare, whom she cared for when he had fallen ill during an acute bout of syphilis. Meanwhile, she became a close friend of Lucrezia, despite their mild contrasts.

Defamatory rumours, likely false, circulated suggesting that Cesare intended to marry Sancha and that the Pope supported this idea. However, the Borgia family was actually interested in her cousin, Charlotte, a legitimate Aragonese princess of Naples who had been reared in France. On 14 June 1497, her rumoured lover and brother-in-law, Giovanni, was murdered. The following year, the recently widowed Lucrezia married her younger brother, Alfonso. Sancha described in detail the wedding dress of Lucrezia, stressing its cost and display of wealth, which denoted her rank. Sancha was infuriated by the ultimate decision of Cesare to wed a French noblewoman, which brought the Borgias in proximity to the intrigues of King Louis XII in the Kingdom of Naples. The French alliance caused shared unrest among the siblings. On 2 August 1499, Sancha and Alfonso fled from Rome for refuge at Genazzano, a commune governed by the House of Colonna, then allied with Naples. In response, Pope Alexander VI demanded her return to the Vatican. Although Sancha initially resisted, she reluctantly complied after he threatened to expel her from Rome.

==== Return and imprisonment ====
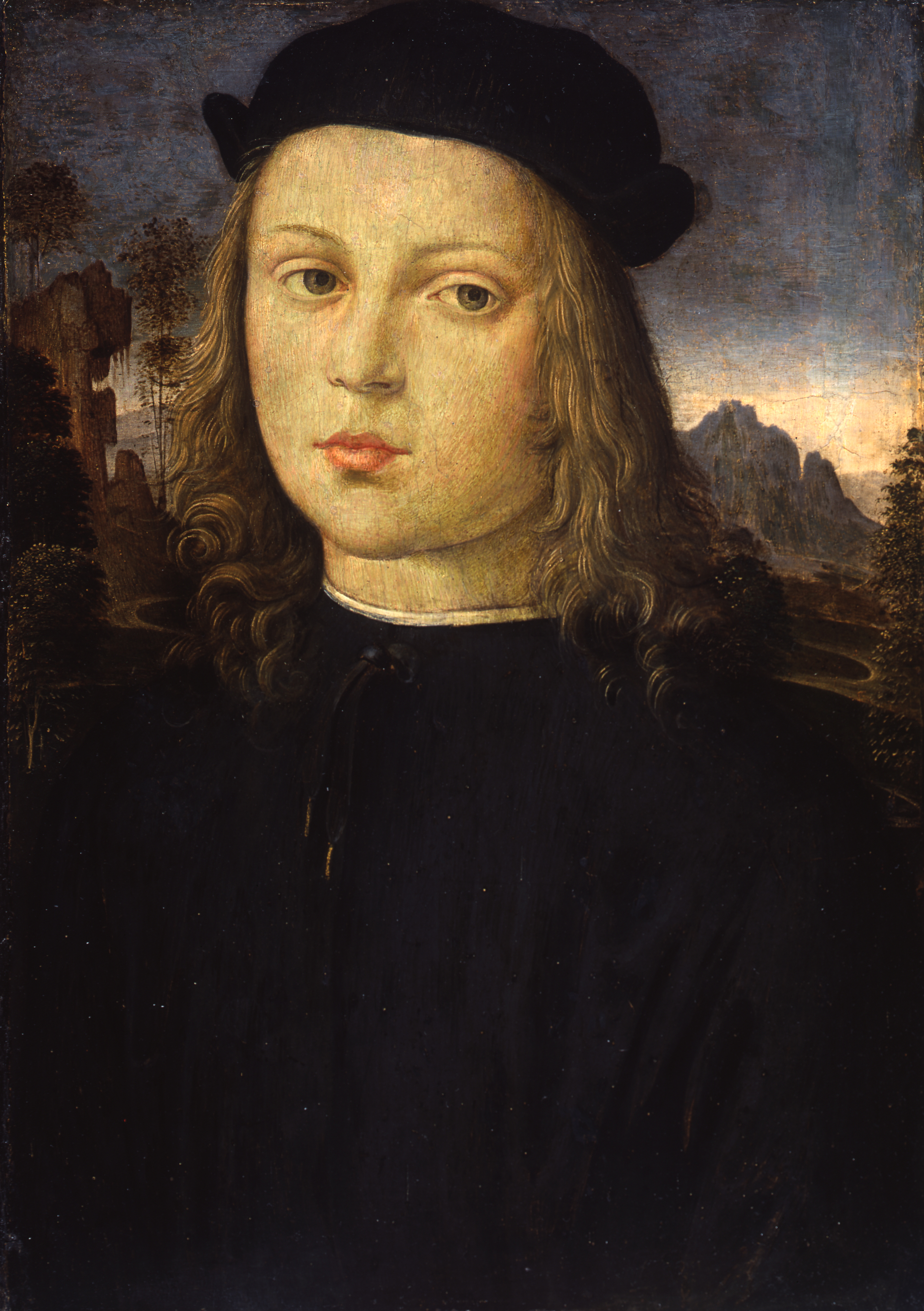
Her brother Alfonso

Once Alfonso had reconciled with the pontiff, Sancha returned to Rome in the winter of 1499–1500. This period of tranquility ended on 15 July 1500, when an ambush on the Duke of Bisceglie left him with severe wounds to his head, arms, and legs. As he lay dying, his sister and Lucrezia stayed by his bedside, nursed him, and prepared his food. On 18 August, Cesare unexpectedly entered the chambers and ordered everyone out, commanding that the young duke be strangled. To emphasize his hostility toward Ferdinand II of Aragon, Sancha was detained in the Castel Sant'Angelo by the Pope until his death (1503). During her imprisonment, which began in October 1502, she initiated a liaison with Cardinal Ippolito d'Este. Cesare was forced to withdraw his troops from Rome and leave the city on 2 September 1503, along with his brother Gioffre and their mother, Vannozza. Around the same time, Sancha was released from captivity and journeyed to Naples with Prospero Colonna.

==== Final years ====
In Naples, she was entrusted with caring for her nephew, Rodrigo, by agreement with Lucrezia, with whom she had remained in contact. Residing in her own domicile palace apart from Gioffre, Sancha became the mistress of Gonzalo Fernández de Córdoba, the man who had captured Cesare in May 1504. Cesare had attempted on multiple occasions to reunite Gioffre and Sancha, but his efforts were in vain. She died childless in 1506. Following her death, Gioffre remarried Maria de Mila de Aragon y Villahermosa, while Rodrigo was sent to Bari and raised by another aunt, the widowed Duchess Isabella.

== In popular culture ==
- In the manga Cantarella which ran from 2000 to 2010, Sancha features as a supporting character.
- In the 2005 novel The Borgia Bride, Sancha is the protagonist.
- In the 2006 Spanish film The Borgia, Sancha was played by Brazilian actress Linda Batista.
- In the 2011 Showtime original series The Borgias, Sancha is portrayed by actress Emmanuelle Chriqui. The character only appears in Season One and does not return for the remaining two seasons.
- In the 2011 Canal+ original series Borgia, Sancha is represented by Czech actress Eliška Křenková.
