= Alfonso II of Naples =

King of Naples from 1494 to 1495

Alfonso II
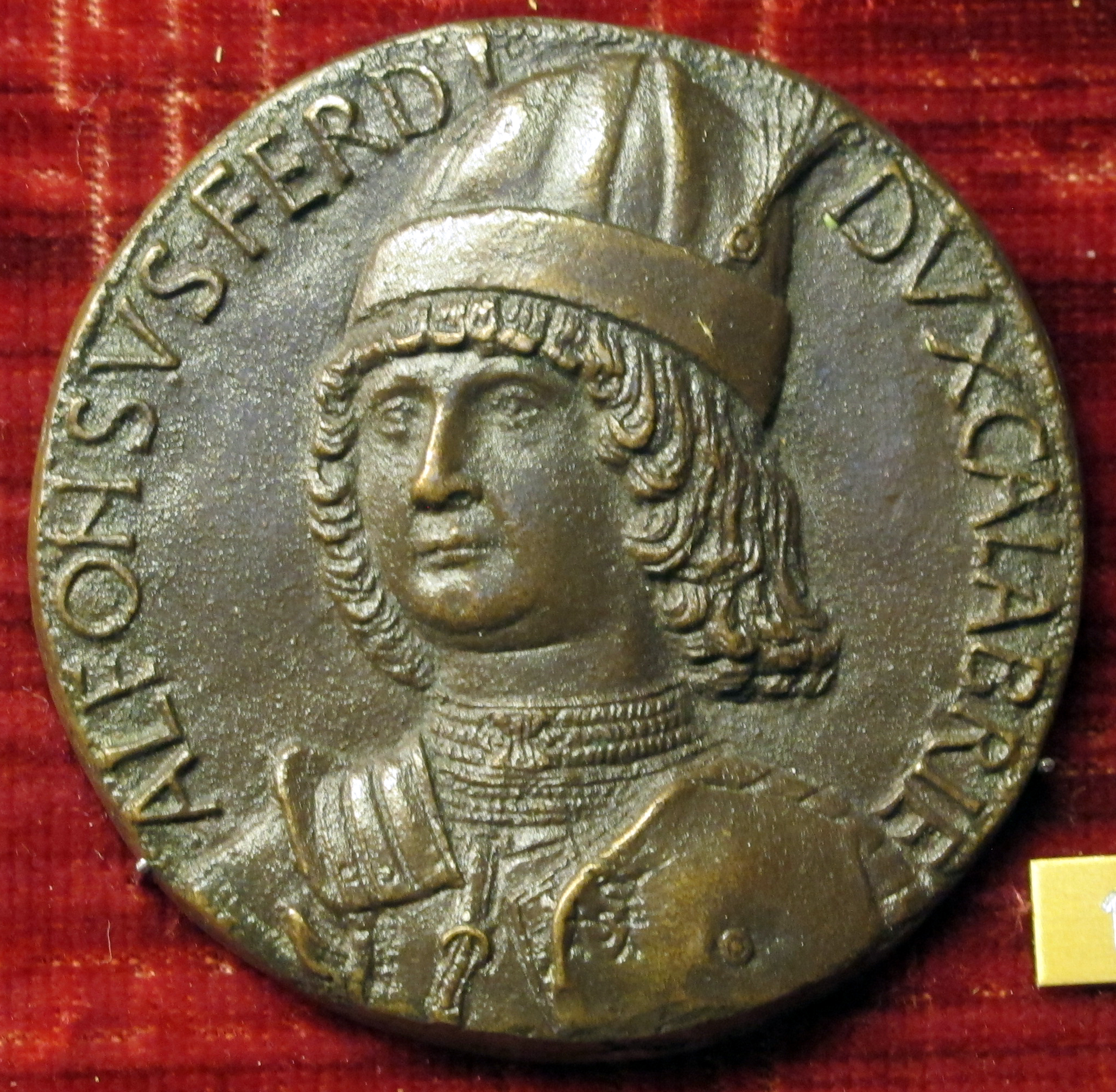
- Medal of Alfonso II of Naples, at the time Duke of Calabria, by Andrea Guazzalotti, 1481

King of Naples
- Reign: 25 January 1494 – 23 January 1495
- Predecessor: Ferdinand I
- Successor: Ferdinand II
- Born: 4 November 1448; Naples, Kingdom of Naples
- Died: 18 December 1495 (aged 47); Mazara del Vallo, Kingdom of Sicily
- Burial: Messina Cathedral
- Spouse: Ippolita Maria Sforza
- Issue: Ferdinand II, King of Naples; Isabella, Duchess of Milan; Piero, Prince of Rossano; Illegitimate: Sancha, Princess of Squillace; Alfonso, Prince of Salerno
- House: Trastámara
- Father: Ferdinand I of Naples
- Mother: Isabella of Clermont

Alfonso II (4 November 1448 – 18 December 1495) was Duke of Calabria and ruled as King of Naples from 25 January 1494 to 23 January 1495. He was a soldier and a patron of Renaissance architecture and the arts.

Heir to his father Ferdinand I's Kingdom of Naples, Alfonso held the dukedom of Calabria for most of his life. In the 1480s, Alfonso commanded the Neapolitan forces in Tuscany in 1478–1479. He helped reverse the Ottoman invasion of Otranto in Apulia in 1480–1481, and against the Republic of Venice in 1484. In 1486, Alfonso's repressive conduct towards the Neapolitan nobility prompted a revolt; the violent excesses of suppressing this uprising further discredited Alfonso and King Ferdinand. Under Alfonso's patronage, the city of Naples was remodelled with new churches, straightened roads, and an aqueduct supplying fountains.

Alfonso became King of Naples in 1494 on his father's death. Within a year, he was forced by the approaching army of Charles VIII of France to abdicate; he was succeeded by his son Ferdinand II of Naples. Alfonso went into an Olivetan monastery at Mazara del Vallo, on Sicily, where he survived until 18 December 1495.

== Biography ==
Born in Naples, Alfonso was the eldest child of Ferdinand I of Naples by his first wife, Isabella of Clermont. In 1463, when Alfonso was fifteen, his maternal great uncle Giovanni Antonio del Balzo Orsini, Prince of Taranto, died, and he obtained some lands from the inheritance. When his mother died in 1465, he succeeded to her feudal claims, including the title King of Jerusalem.

Alfonso's education was at his father's humanist court. His tutor between 1468 and 1475 was the humanist Giovanni Pontano, whose De principe describes the proper virtues and manner of life becoming to a prince; the work took the form of letter of advice to the twenty-year old Alfonso, then Duke of Calabria, in 1468. Pontano dedicated a further treatise on courage, De fortitudine, to Alfonso in 1481, after his victory over the Ottoman invasion of Otranto, and remained close as his personal secretary until Alfonso's abdication.

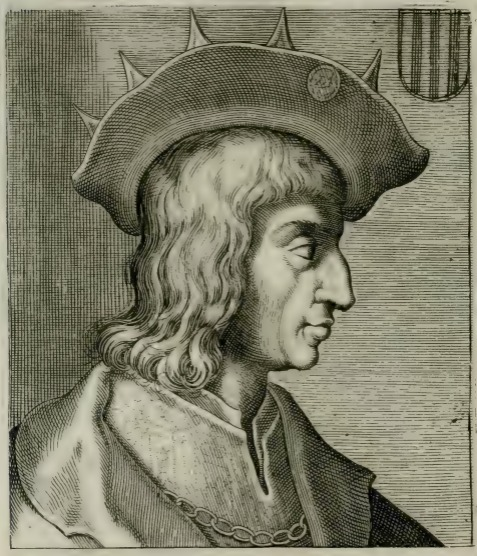
Alfonso depicted in the work Portraits of a hundred illustrious captains by Aliprando Caprioli, 1596.

As a condottiero, Alfonso fought in the most important wars of the age, such the war following the Pazzi Conspiracy (1478–1480) and the War of Ferrara (1482–1484). Alfonso had shown himself a skilled and determined soldier, helping his father in the suppression of the conspiracy of the barons (1485) and in the defense of the Kingdom's territory against the Papal claims.

When his father died, the kingdom's finances were exhausted and the invasion of Italy by King Charles VIII of France was imminent. Instigated by Lodovico Sforza, who wished to stir up trouble to allow him to seize power in Milan, and with papal support, Charles decided to reassert the Angevin claim to Naples. He invaded Italy in September 1494 and was able to move swiftly south along the peninsula. Alfonso managed to regain the support of Pope Alexander VI, who invited Charles to devote his effort against the Turks instead. Alfonso was crowned on 8 May 1494 by the papal legate Juan de Borja Lanzol de Romaní, el mayor.

Charles, however, did not relent; by early 1495 Charles was approaching Naples, after having defeated Florence and the Neapolitan fleet under Alfonso's brother Frederick at Porto Venere. Alfonso, terrified by a series of portents, as well as unusual dreams and despised by Neapolitans, he abdicated in favor of his son, Ferdinand II. He then fled to a Sicilian monastery. He died in Messina later that year.

== Appearance and personality ==
At a young age he was described by ladies and ambassadors as a very handsome young man, "So pretty you couldn't say", but "so alive that he couldn't sit still for half an hour". Doctors and ambassadors were surprised by his physical endurance, as he was able to keep himself healthy while eating and drinking very little and often in a hurry, being continuously busy in different activities during the day and resting a few hours at night, which he spent continuously with his wife.

He was nicknamed "the Guercio" by the people because he had his left eye marked, but it is not known whether from illness, from injury or from birth. According to other historians, this was instead because of his grim look and the habit of looking crooked. Francesco Pansa judges instead that he was squinting.

He had exceptional military skills and spent most of his life on the battlefields, leading a soldier's life. Andrea Bernardi says that, following the death of the famous leader Roberto Sanseverino, Alfonso remained the first armigero of Italy.

However, he was greatly feared and hated by the Neapolitan people for his "most cruel insults and offenses", for the most heinous crimes, such as "violating virgins, taking other women for his pleasure", and practicing the "detestable and abominable vice of sodomy."

For example, the anonymous author of the Chronicum venetum – but it should be remembered that the Venetians were sworn enemies of the Neapolitans and of the Aragonese in particular – wrote that "wanting to narrate the tyranny, cruelty, lustful and dishonest appetites, betrayals, assassinations, and murders of King Ferrante and of Alfonso d'Aragona, his eldest son, Duke of Calabria, father of betrayals, conservative of rebels, a great book would not be enough for me: I believe that Nero was a saint among these tyrants."

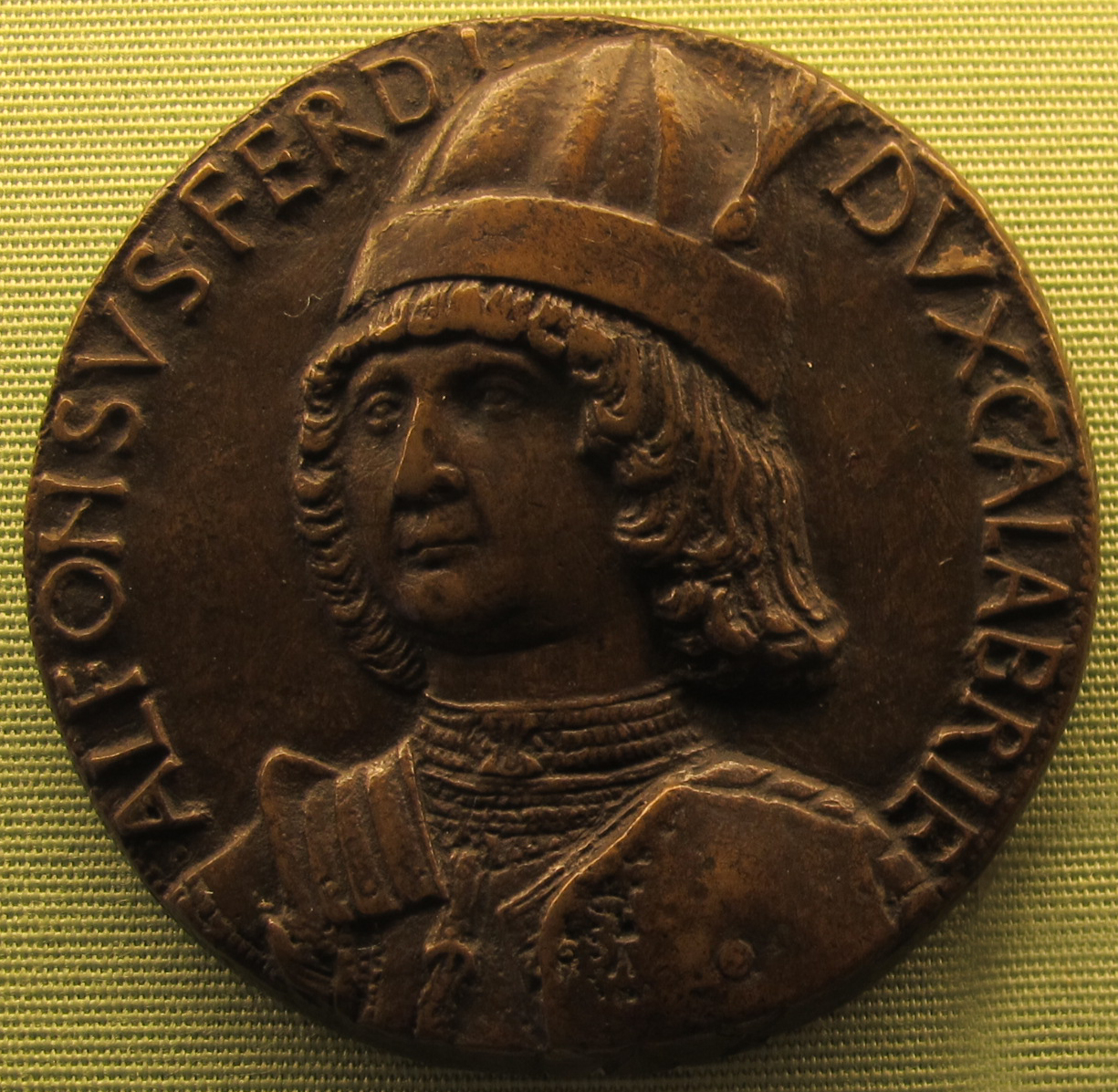
Medal of Alfonso in armour, Andrea Guazzalotti, 1481.

Beyond the possible exaggerations of enemy faction, many episodes of Alfonso's life confirm these aspects of his character, such as the fact that he expropriated numerous lands without offering any compensation to the legitimate owners (who, it is said, died of pain) for the construction of the villa of Poggio Reale, and that in the same way he evicted the nuns of La Maddalena for the construction of the villa called La Duchesca. He also obtained for the Como family (his friends) the splendid garden that Francesco Scannasorice owned adjacent to their palace. Scannasorice had refused numerous times to cede the garden to the Como, despite generous offers of money, but he did not dare to refuse the fearsome Duke of Calabria. The Neapolitans were so terrified of him that at the death of King Ferrante they all ran to barricade themselves in their houses, shouting "inside! inside!", not even if they were chased by enemies. His wife Ippolita Maria Sforza herself experienced his cruelty. When newly married, jealous of her husband, she sent her own trusted servant, Donato, to keep an eye on Alfonso in his travels. Alfonso's reaction towards Donato was of such recklessness that Ippolita wrote to her mother: "This thing about Donato that I will never forget [...] not a wound to the heart, but I think it opened in the middle, so much was my pain and it will be".

It was no coincidence that, when the situation of the kingdom became desperate, Alfonso decided to abdicate in favor of his son, since he was so hated for his vices and cruelty as Ferrandino loved for his virtues and justice.

== Mistresses ==
The Successi tragici et amorosi, by Silvio Ascanio Corona, is a seventeenth-century collection of novels revealing the purported secrets of the Aragonese court of Naples. It states that Alfonso had many mistresses, like his father Ferrante.

His first mistress was Isabella Stanza, bridesmaid of his mother Isabella of Chiaramonte; the relationship, however, did not last long. As soon as his mother – a very chaste and very religious woman – had a hint of the relationship, she married Isabella to Giovan Battista Rota, a nobleman very fond of the Aragonese faction, and thus separated her from Alfonso.

After her, Alfonso had his best-known mistress, Trogia Gazzella, whom he openly displayed in court, and who bore him two illegitimate children.

When he tired of Gazzella, he pursued Francesca Caracciolo, called Ceccarella, but she, faithful to her husband, refused him. Alfonso had her kidnapped and, for several days, abused her at will until her father Muzio Caracciolo and husband Riccardo persuaded King Ferrante to make his son release her. Ceccarella then retired to the convent of San Sebastiano, where shortly after, she died of pain. Alfonso, feeling humiliated, then had Muzio killed, and Riccardo, fearing for his life, took the monastic habit.

Another mistress was Maria d'Avellanedo, a Spanish noblewoman and bridesmaid of his stepmother Joanna of Aragon. During this affair, Maria was then married to Alfonso Caracciolo, knight of the seat of Capuana, later to a nobleman of the Montefuscolo family, and then to Galeotto Pagano of the seat of Porto.

Yet another was Laura Crispano, whom he had by force, and who he then married to his waiter Angelo Crivelli Milanese.

== Renaissance culture ==
Alfonso participated in the brilliant Renaissance culture that surrounded his father's court. His lasting contribution to European culture was the example set at his villas of La Duchesca and especially Poggio Reale just outside Naples, which so captivated Charles VIII of France during his brief sojourn at Naples during February–June 1495, that he was inspired to emulation of the "earthly paradise" he encountered.

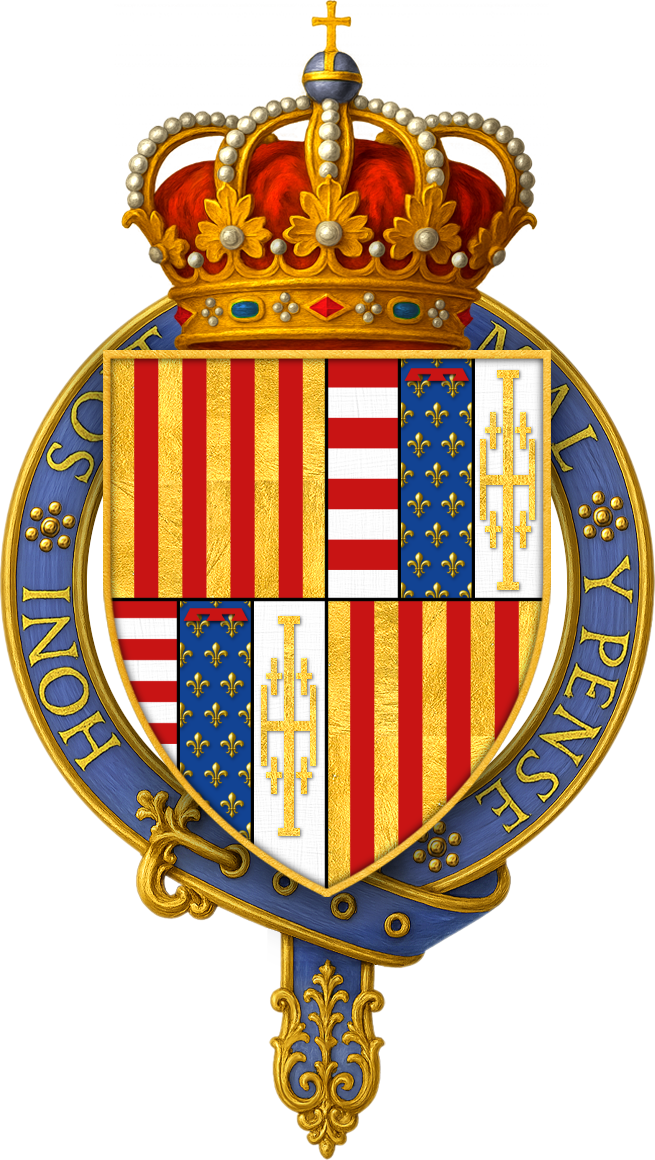
Arms of Alfonso II, King of Naples, KG

Poggio Reale, which Giorgio Vasari said was designed by Giuliano da Maiano and was laid out in the 1480s, has utterly disappeared and no extensive description has survived. Decades later, Vasari reported, "At Poggio Reale [Giuliano da Maiano] laid out the architecture of that palazzo, always considered a most beautiful thing; and to fresco it he brought there Pietro del Donzello, a Florentine, and Polito his brother who was considered in that time a good master, who painted the whole palazzo, inside and out, with the history of the said king." There are no archives to connect Giuliano or his brother Benedetto with the project; for documentation only a section and plan, reproduced with apologies for its inaccuracy, by Sebastiano Serlio. Serlio's reproduction seems to show an idealized plan, identical on all four sides, ranged around a court with a double arcading.

It is clear that the Aragonese court at Naples introduced the Moorish garden traditions of Valencia, with its shaded avenues and baths, sophisticated hydraulics that powered splendid waterworks, formal tanks, fishponds and fountains, as a luxurious and secluded setting for court life, and combined them with Roman features: Alfonso's Poggio Reale was built around three sides of an arcaded courtyard with tiers of seating round a sunken centre that could be flooded for water spectacles; on the fourth side it opened onto a garden that framed a spectacular view of Vesuvius.

It was all unlike anything experienced by the French king, who retreated from Italy, loaded with tapestries and works of art, and filled with building and gardening ambitions, but he would die young only three years later.

== Marriage and children ==
Alfonso's spouse was Princess of Milan, Ippolita Maria Sforza, whom he married on 10 October 1465 in Milan. His mistress, by whom he also had children, was Trogia Gazzella.

He had three children with Ippolita Maria Sforza:

- King Ferdinand II of Naples (26 August 1469 – October 1496), married Joanna of Naples
- Isabella of Aragon, Duchess of Milan and of Bari, Princess of Rossano (2 October 1470 – 11 February 1524), married her first cousin Gian Galeazzo Sforza, Duke of Milan, January 1490.
- Piero, Prince of Rossano (31 March 1472 – 17 February 1491), Lieutenant General of Apulia, died of an infection following leg surgery.

And two with Trogia Gazzella:

- Sancia of Aragon, Princess of Squillace (1478–1506), married Gioffre Borgia in 1494.
- Alfonso, Duke of Bisceglie and Prince of Salerno (1481 – 18 August 1500), married Lucrezia Borgia in 1498.

By Maria d'Avellanedo he had two sons, Francesco and Carlo, both of whom died at a young age.

From Laura Crispano he had a little girl who died in swaddling clothes.

== In popular culture ==
Alfonso II of Naples is portrayed by Augustus Prew in the Showtime series The Borgias, although he is portrayed as much younger and flamboyant than his historical counterpart was in the 1490s. Sancia of Aragon is portrayed as his half-sister rather than his daughter. In the European series Borgia written by Tom Fontana, where he is played by Raimund Wallisch, his portrayal is more historically accurate in terms of his age and Sancia being his daughter. In Da Vinci's Demons he is played by Kieran Bew and is depicted as a sadistic warlord, bitterly jealous of Lorenzo the Magnificent.

William Shakespeare's play The Tempest features two fictional characters: "Alonso, King of Naples" and "Ferdinand, son to the King of Naples" who may have been named after Alfonso II and his son Ferdinand II.

== Notes ==
Alfonso II of Naples House of Trastámara Cadet branch of the House of Ivrea Born: 4 November 1448 Died: 18 December 1495
Regnal titles
Preceded by Ferdinand I	King of Naples; 1494–1495	Succeeded by Charles the Affable
