= Alfonso of Aragon (1481–1500) =

Alfonso De Colabria
- Duke of Bisceglie, Prince of Salerno
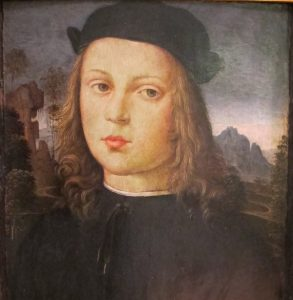
- Alfonso of Aragon (age 7) by Pinturicchio (Identification without a reliable source. It is a "Portrait of a youth" attributed to the Master of San Spirito, circa 1500, and kept in the Gemäldegalerie in Berlin).
- Born: 1481; Kingdom of Naples
- Died: 18 August 1500 (aged 18–19); Rome, Papal States
- Spouse: Lucrezia Borgia (m. 1498)
- Issue: Rodrigo of Aragon
- House: Trastámara
- Father: Alfonso II of Naples
- Mother: Trogia Gazzella

Alfonso of Aragon (1481 – 18 August 1500), Duke of Bisceglie and Prince of Salerno of the House of Trastámara, was the illegitimate son of Alfonso II King of Naples and his mistress Trogia Gazzella. His father, cousin of King Ferdinand II of Aragon, abdicated in favor of his legitimate son Ferdinand II of Naples.

== Early life ==
Alfonso was born in Naples as the son of Alfonso II of Naples and Trogia (also called Trusia, Turzia and Troggia) Gazella (b. 1460) daughter of Antonio Gazzella of Gaeta. and Orsina Carafa di Castelluccio. Alfonso was through his grand-mother related to the influential Carafa family and was the great-great-grandson of Diomede Carafa (d. 1487) who had been a staunch supporter of Alfonso V of Aragon (grand-father of Alfonso II and great-grandfather to Alfonso) in his claim for Naples.

Alfonso's mother was married to the neapolitan noble Antonio Carbone, Marchese de Padulo. After marriage, she and her husband became members of the court of Alfonso, (then the Duke of Calabria). Trogia became his mistress and gave birth to Alfonso and his older sister Sanchia.

Alfonso also had an older half-sister Lucrezia from his mothers marriage to Carbone and from his father Alfonso's marriage to Ippolita Maria Sforza, his half-siblings Ferdinand and Isabella. Alfonso's father also had other mistresses with whom he had children but they died in young age.

Alfonso's mother remarried after the death of Alfonso II in 1495 to Cesare Gesualdo, Lord of Paterno from Capua.

Alfonso received a thorough education in the humanities. His first tutor was Giuniano Maio who was then followed by the Florentine poet Raffaele Brandolini (also known as "Lippus Brandolinus" because of his blindness). From an early age Alfonso was involved in the crisis that hit the Aragonese dynasty of Naples. In 1495, during the French occupation, his father fled and later died in Sicily. Alfonso, aged 14, fought for the return to the throne of his half-brother Ferdinand, who became king of Naples in 1495 but died one year later. In 1497, with the restoration of the Aragonese control under his uncle Frederick IV of Naples, Alfonso was assigned to the first position of responsibility and became the Lieutenant general of Abruzzo.

== Marriage ==
"He was the most beautiful youth that I have ever seen in Rome"

— – The chronicler Talini

In order to strengthen ties with Naples, Pope Alexander VI arranged marriages between the House of Borgia and the royal family of Aragon. Alfonso's sister Sancha of Aragon was already given to the Pope's youngest son Gioffre Borgia in 1494. Alexander VI's idea was for his son Cesare Borgia to marry Carlotta of Naples, legitimate daughter of the newly crowned King Frederick IV of Naples, but Carlotta would not agree to marry him. To appease the Pope, King Frederick eventually consented to a match between the Pope's daughter Lucrezia Borgia, aged 18, and the 17-year-old Alfonso of Aragon.

On 15 July 1498 Alfonso entered Rome in disguise. Alfonso and Lucrezia were married in the Vatican on 21 July with the celebrations being held behind closed doors. With Alfonso came the princely cities of Salerno, Quadrata and Bisceglie. Lucrezia brought with her a dowry of 40,000 ducats. It was part of the agreement that they would remain in Rome for at least one year and not be forced to live permanently at the Kingdom of Naples until her father's death. According to Gregorovius, "the youthful Alfonso was fair and amiable", "the most handsome young man ever seen in the Imperial city." By all evidence, Lucrezia was genuinely fond of him. In February 1499, Lucrezia reportedly lost her first baby with Alfonso. However, she was soon pregnant again.

As the political situation changed, Pope Alexander VI looked to align with France, enemy of Alfonso's family. To this end he arranged a marriage between Cesare Borgia and Charlotte of Albret, sister of King John III of Navarre. Alfonso sensed betrayal when France planned to invade Naples and on 2 August 1499 left Rome without his wife, who was six months pregnant. His flight incensed the Pope who sent troops after him but failed to find him. Meanwhile, Lucrezia was awarded the governorship of Spoleto and Foligno, meaning that Alfonso was a consort without formal responsibilities. Eventually Alfonso was discovered through the letters he was sending to his wife in an attempt to persuade her to join him in Genazzano. With this discovery her family ordered her to lure Alfonso to Rome. Lucrezia met her husband in Nepi. They then returned to the Vatican in September 1499. On the night of 31 October/1 November, Lucrezia gave birth to their son, who was christened Rodrigo after her father.

== Murder ==
"Since Don Alfonso refused to die of his wounds, he was strangled in his bed"

— – Burchard

On the evening of 15 July 1500, at the top of the steps before the entrance to St. Peter's Basilica, Alfonso was attacked by hired killers and stabbed in the head, right arm, and leg. When the assassins attempted to take Alfonso with them, his own guards put them to flight. Alfonso was residing in the palace of Santa Maria in Portico, but so desperate was his condition that he was taken to the chamber of the Borgia Tower where he was cared for by his doctors from Naples, his sister, Sancha, and his wife, Lucrezia. On the night of 18 August, as Alfonso was still recovering from his wounds, Micheletto Corella and a group of armed men entered his room and strangled him in his bed until he was dead. Following his death, his body was carried to the Basilica of St Peter and there placed in the Chapel of the Virgin Mary of the Fever.

In the political context of a French campaign against Naples, Cesare Borgia is the most likely candidate being behind the assassination. In his own defence, Cesare argued that Alfonso had attempted to kill him with a crossbow shot as he walked in the garden, but not many believed him. Alfonso, given his sympathy for the Colonna family, had enemies at Rome amongst the Orsini too, and Pastor suggested that they were behind the killing, though most evidence points to Cesare Borgia. Also accused was Alfonso's uncle Giovan Maria Gazzera, mysteriously killed in Rome shortly after, and even Pope Alexander VI, because Alfonso, in May 1500, showed his discontent with the Pope's decision to nullify the marriage between Alfonso's aunt Beatrice of Naples and Vladislaus II of Hungary.

Two years later Lucrezia was given in marriage to Alfonso I d'Este. Lucrezia was obliged to simulate the appearance of a virgin spouse in order to marry d'Este. Accordingly, she was forced to leave Rodrigo of Aragon, her only child by Alfonso of Aragon, behind forever. Rodrigo Borgia of Aragon died of a disease in Bari at the age of 12.

== Portrayals ==
- Alfons Fryland in Lucrezia Borgia (Film, US, 1922)
- Max Michel in Lucrèce Borgia (Film by director Abel Gance, France, 1935)
- John Sutton in Bride of Vengeance (Film, US, 1949)
- Massimo Serato in Lucrèce Borgia (Film, France, 1953)
- Fred Robsahm in Lucrezia Giovane (Film, Italy, 1974)
- Robert Allman (singer) in Lucrezia Borgia (Opera by Donizetti, La Scala, 1977)
- Ryan Michael in The Borgias (BBC Two and RAI Series, England-Italy, 1981)
- Alexander Katsapov (dancer) in Lucrezia Borgia (Opera at the National Theatre Ballet, Prague, 2003)
- Giorgio Marchesi in Los Borgia (Film by director Antonio Hernández, Spain, 2006)
- Alejandro Albarracín in Borgia (Canal+ Series, France, 2011)
- Sebastian de Souza in The Borgias (Showtime Series, US, 2013)
