= Sancha of Aragon =

Sancha of Aragon may refer to:

- Sancha of Aragon (died 1097), daughter of King Ramiro I
- Sancha of Aragon, Countess of Toulouse
- Sancha of Aragon, Princess of Squillace, illegitimate daughter of King Alfonso of Naples
- Sancha of Castile, Queen of Aragon
