= Gioffre Borgia =

Son of Pope Alexander VI

- Prince of Squillace
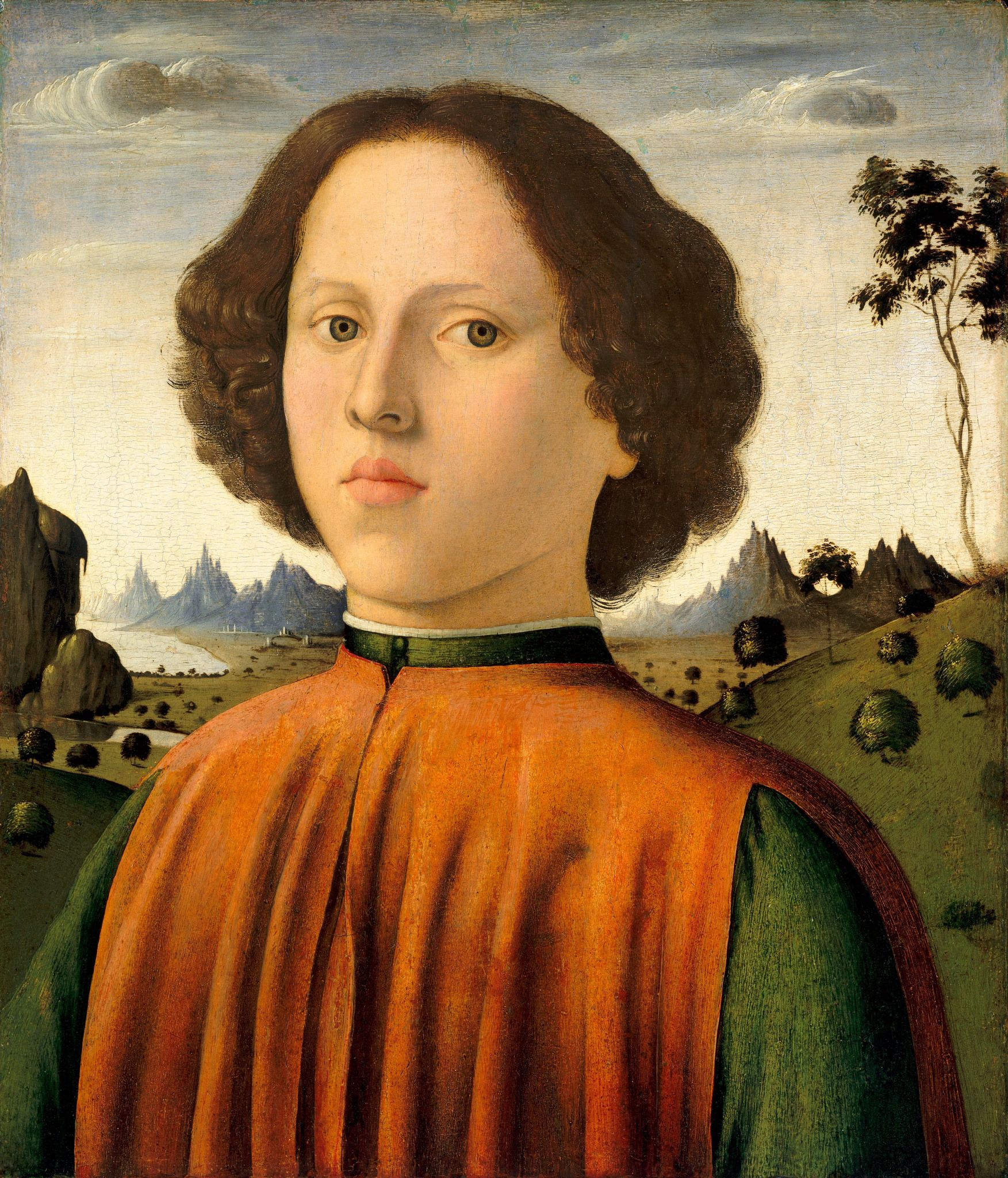
- A portrait of a young man, believed to be Jofré Borgia.
- Born: 1481; Rome, Papal States
- Died: January 1517 (aged 35–36); Squillace, Kingdom of Naples
- Noble family: House of Borgia
- Spouses: Sancha of Aragon (m. 1494; died 1506) Maria de Mila of Aragon
- Issue: Geronimo Borgia ill. Second marriage Francesco Borgia de Mila; Lucrezia Borgia de Mila; Antonia Borgia de Mila; Maria Borgia de Mila
- Father: Pope Alexander VI
- Mother: Vannozza dei Cattanei

Gioffre Borgia (1481 – January 1517), also known as Goffredo Borgia (Italian) or Jofré Borja (Valencian), was the youngest illegitimate son of Pope Alexander VI and Vannozza dei Cattanei, and a member of the House of Borgia. He was the youngest brother of Cesare, Giovanni, and Lucrezia Borgia.

== Early relations ==
Gioffre married Sancha of Aragon, natural daughter of Alfonso II of Naples, obtaining as dowry both the Principality of Squillace (1494), and after a period of political turmoil in the Kingdom of Naples, the Duchy of Alvito (1497).

Gioffre and Sancha were 12 and 16, respectively, at the time of their marriage. The marriage was a political one. Alfonso married his daughter to Gioffre and gave the over-large dowry in return for Pope Alexander's recognition of Alfonso's claim to the throne of Naples. Almost as soon as the wedding ceremony was over, the political situation changed with the invasion of Italy by King Charles VIII of France, who claimed Naples as his own. Alfonso fled, leaving the throne to his short-lived son, and a long war between Spain, France and their Italian adherents ensued.

During this time the young couple lived mostly at Rome, where Sancha reputedly had affairs with both of her husband's elder brothers, Giovanni and Cesare, among others. In the beginning of their marriage, Sancha was somewhat domineering over her husband and she sought after older men.

Gioffre's relationship with his father was poor. Pope Alexander VI legitimized him, but privately expressed doubts that Gioffre was his son. He considered him a weakling because of his lack of interest in politics.

== Later life ==
During the War of 1499–1504, when Louis XII of France attempted to conquer Naples, Gioffre sided with the French; but when he was captured by Prospero Colonna he changed sides to join the Spanish, which caused a rebellion in Alvito. In 1504 he sent the condottiero Fabrizio Colonna to stabilise his lands, partly paid for with money he had appropriated from the papal treasury after the death of his father the year before. With the rebellion crushed, Gioffre finally moved to his estates in Alvito and Squillace in 1504.

Two years later Sancha died childless. Consequently, the Spanish King of Naples, Ferdinand II of Aragon, took possession of Gioffre's estates in Alvito. However, Gioffre was able to retain Squillace, on the Calabrian coast, which he ruled as a feudal vassal of Naples.

Gioffre's second marriage in 1506 was to one of Sancha's cousins, Maria de Mila de Aragón y de Villahermosa. They had a son, Francesco, and three daughters: Lucrezia, Antonia and Maria. Francesco inherited his father's lands and the title of Prince of Squillace. Gioffre's descendants ruled the city of Squillace until 1735. They generally ruled through governors, since they resided at either Naples or the Spanish court. After his death, the existence of a natural son, Geronimo, was also revealed, who was entrusted to his sister Lucrezia at the request of their mother Vannozza.

== Issue ==
By his second wife, Maria de Mila, Gioffre had a son and three daughters:

- Francesco Borgia de Mila. II prince of Squillace, married Isabella Piccolomini and later Isabella of Aragon;
- Lucrezia Borgia de Mila, married Giovanni Battista Carafa, Marquis of Castelvetere;
- Antonia Borgia de Mila, married Antonio Todeschini Piccolomini, Marquis of Delicete;
- Maria Borgia de Mila, married Michele Ayerba of Aragon, Count of Simari.

He had also a natural son:

- Geronimo Borgia (born c. 1506). After his father's death, he was entrusted to his aunt Lucrezia Borgia at the request of Vannozza and raised at the Este court in Ferrara.

== Representations in popular culture ==
=== Television ===
- In the 1981 BBC mini-series The Borgias, Jofré is played by British Actor Louis Selwyn.
- In the 2006 Spanish-Italian film The Borgia, Jofré is played by Spanish actor Eloy Azorín.
- In the 2011 Showtime series The Borgias, Joffré is played by British actor Aidan Alexander. The role was a minor one, and he only appeared in the first season.
- In the 2011 Canal+ series Borgia, Goffredo is played by Czech actor Adam Mišík in the first and second seasons. In the third and final season, the role is played by Italian actor Niccolò Besio. In this series, his son Francesco is depicted as being the bastard son of his first wife Sancia from her affair with his brother Juan, as opposed to being his own legitimate son by his second wife, Maria de Mila.
