= Squillace (disambiguation) =

Squillace is a town and commune in southern Italy.

Squillace may also refer to:

- Gulf of Squillace, an inlet of the Ionian Sea off the coast of Italy
- Diocese of Squillace, a former diocese, now part of the Roman Catholic Archdiocese of Catanzaro-Squillace

== See also ==
- Gioffre Borgia (1482–1522), Prince of Squillace, youngest son of Pope Alexander VI, brother of Lucrezia and Cesare Borgia
- Anne of Savoy (1455–1480), Princess of Squillace, Altamura, and Taranto
- Leopoldo de Gregorio, Marquis of Esquilache, originally Squillace (1741–1785)
- Jean de Montfort-Castres (died 1300), Count of Squillace
