= List of codices =

List of pre-modern handwritten books

This is a list of notable codices.

For the purposes of this compilation, as in philology, a "codex" is a manuscript book published from the late Antiquity period through the Middle Ages. (The majority of the books in both the list of manuscripts and list of illuminated manuscripts are codices.) More modern works that include "codex" as part of their name are not listed here. The following codices are usually named for their most famous resting-places, such as a city or library.

== List ==
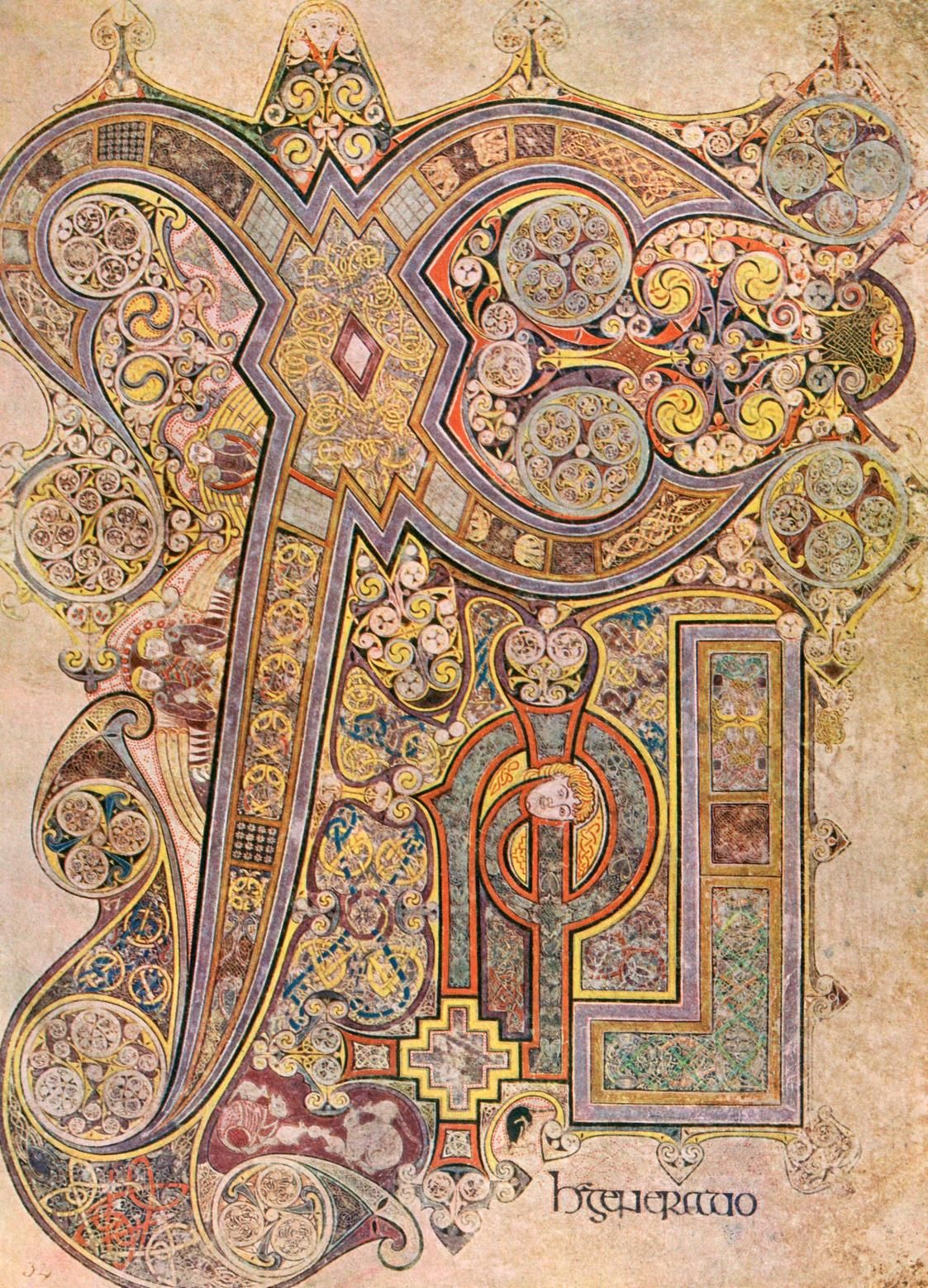
The Chi Rho monogram from the Book of Kells.

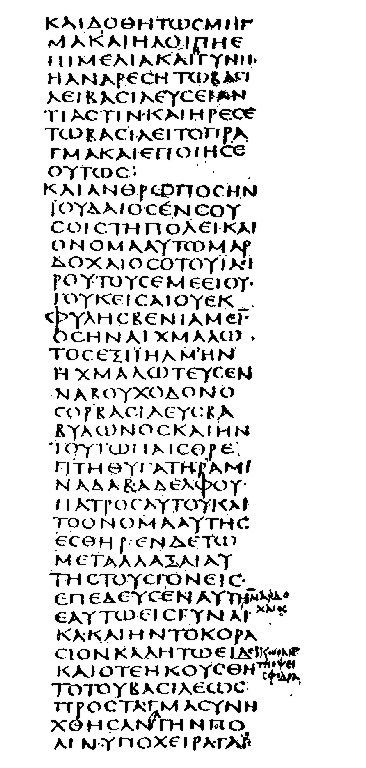
A portion of the Codex Sinaiticus, containing the Book of Esther 2:3-8.

- Abrogans
- Aleppo Codex
- Codex Alexandrinus
- Al-Ousta Codex
- Codices Ambrosiani
- Codex Ashmole 61
- Codex Amiatinus
- Codex Argenteus
- Arnamagnæan Manuscript Collection
- Codex Arundel
- Codex Astensis
- Codex Atlanticus
- Codex Augiensis
- Auraicept na n-Éces
- Codex Aureus of Echternach
- Codex Aureus of Lorsch
- Codex Aureus of St. Emmeram
- Book of Ballymote
- Berlin Codex
- Boxer Codex
- Codex Bezae
- Codex Boernerianus
- Codex Borbonicus
- Aztec codices#Boturini Codex
- Carmina Burana
- Codex Cairensis
- Codex Calixtinus
- Codex Chimalpahin
- Codex Claromontanus
- Maya codices (Cortesianus Codex)
- Codex Cumanicus
- Damascus Pentateuch
- De arte venandi cum avibus
- Dresden Codex
- Codex Ebnerianus
- Codex Ephraemi Rescriptus
- Codex Eyckensis
- Exeter Book
- Flateyjarbók
- Codex Gigas
- Codex Grandior
- Codex Hierosolymitanus
- Hildegard of Bingen#Works
- Hitda Codex
- Hypatian Codex
- Heidelberg Codex
- In Lebor Ogaim
- Book of Kells
- Codex Koridethi
- Lebor Gabála Érenn
- Lebor na gCeart
- Codex Leicester
- Leningrad Codex
- Cologne Mani-Codex
- Madrid Codex (Maya)
- Codex Manesse
- Matenadaran MS 7117
- Codex Mendoza
- Morgan Bible
- Nag Hammadi library
- Novgorod Codex
- Nowell Codex
- Nürnberger Handschrift GNM 3227a
- Codex Peregrini
- Paris Codex
- Peterborough Chronicle
- Codex Pisanus
- El primer nueva corónica y buen gobierno
- Codex Rabbulensis
- Codex Regius
- Codex Rehdigerianus
- Rohonc Codex
- Codex Quetzalecatzin
- Codex Rotundus
- Codex Runicus
- Codex S1
- Codex Sangallensis 878
- Codex Selden
- Codex Sinaiticus
- Codex Suprasliensis
- Codex Tchacos
- Maya codices (Troano Codex)
- Codex Usserianus Primus
- Codex Vaticanus Graecus 1209
- Codex Vigilanus
- Codex Vindobonensis 795
- Codex Vindobonensis B 11093
- Codex Wallerstein
- Chronicle of Henry of Livonia (Codex Zamoscianus)
- Codex Zouche-Nuttall
