= Philip Montfort =

Philip Montfort may refer to:

- Philip of Montfort, Lord of Tyre (died 17 March 1270)
- Philip of Montfort, Lord of Castres (died 24 September 1270)
