= Mystia =

Bruttium

Mystia (Greek: Μυστία, Μυστιανός) was an ancient town of Bruttium.

== History ==
The town of Mystia seems to have been situated on the east coast of the province of Bruttium, between Scylacium and the Zephyrian promontory, apparently not far from Cape Cocinthus (Capo di Stilo). Stephanus of Byzantium cites Philistus as calling it a city of the Samnites, by which he must evidently mean their Lucanian or Bruttian descendants. Its position cannot be more exactly determined, but it is placed conjecturally at Monasterace, near the Capo di Stilo.

== See also ==
- Magna Graecia

== Sources ==
- Dyer, Thomas H. (1857). "Mystia". In Smith, William (ed.). Dictionary of Greek and Roman Geography. Vol. 2: Iabadius–Zymethus. London: Walton and Maberly. p. 390.
