= Squillace =

Squillace Skylàkion (Greek)
- Comune
- Città di Squillace
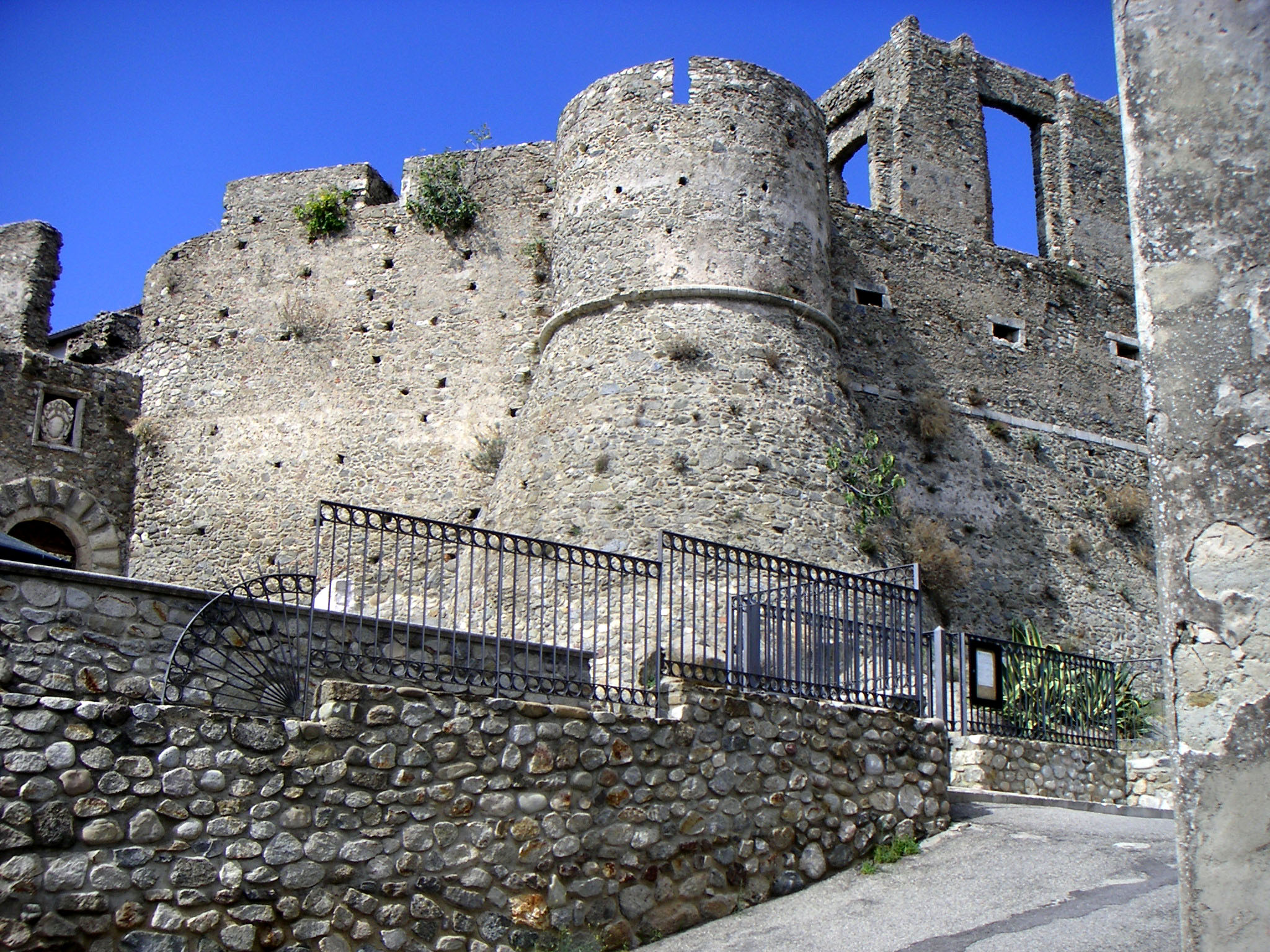

- Coat of arms

- Location within Italy Location within Calabria
- Coordinates: 38°47′N 16°31′E
- Country: Italy
- Region: Calabria
- Province: Catanzaro (CZ)
- Frazioni: Fiasco Baldaia, Squillace Lido

Government
  - Mayor: Pasquale Muccari

Area
  - Total: 33 km^{2} (13 sq mi)
- Elevation: 344 m (1,129 ft)

Population (December 31, 2013)
  - Total: 3,541
  - Density: 110/km^{2} (280/sq mi)
- Demonym: Squillacesi
- Time zone: UTC+1 (CET)
  - Summer (DST): UTC+2 (CEST)
- Postal code: 88069
- Dialing code: 0961
- Patron saint: St. Agathius Martyr
- Saint day: May 7
- Website: http://www.squillace.org

Squillace (Calabrian Greek: Skylàkion; Ancient Greek: Σκυλλήτιον, romanized: Skyllḗtion; Medieval Greek: Σκυλάκιον, romanized: Skylákion) is an ancient town and comune in the Province of Catanzaro, part of Calabria, Southern Italy.

Squillace is situated near the east coast of Calabria, facing the shores of the eponymous Gulf of Squillace (Italian: Golfo di Squillace), which indents the coast of Calabria on the east as deeply as that of the Gulf of Saint Euphemia (Italian: Golfo di Sant'Eufemia) does on the west, with a comparatively narrow isthmus between them facing the eponymous gulf.

== History ==
Squillace is known today as one of Italy's most important archaeological sites as well as a popular resort. The name derives from the ancient city of Scylletium, the principal ruins of which are located in the nearby comune of Borgia. The Roman statesman and writer Cassiodorus founded a monastery called Vivarium on his family estates on the shores of the Ionian Sea in the 6th century AD. This monastery was on the site of the modern Santa Maria de Vetere near Squillace.

=== Medieval and early modern history ===
The modern town was founded as a Byzantine fortress during the Byzantine reconquest of Italy (6th–8th century). During the Middle Ages it was subject to frequent raids by Saracens, who made it for a short time a strong military base. After this brief Arab rule the city fell under the hegemony of the Normans, who in 1044 built a castle and transformed the settlement into a county.

During the Kingdom of Sicily, with the lordship of Roger of Lauria, Squillace passed first to Robert of Anjou and to the counts of Monfort, then for one hundred and fifty years the city was ruled by the Marzano family. In 1445, it reverted to the Aragonese Kings of Naples but passed by marriage to the infamous House of Borgia, who ruled the city as Princes of Squillace from 1494 to 1735. The Borgias themselves lived either in Naples or in Spain, being represented in Squillace by governors.

Gioffre Borgia (1482–1516), son of Pope Alexander VI and younger brother of Cesare Borgia and Lucrezia Borgia, married Sancia (Sancha) of Aragon, daughter of Alfonso II of Naples. Gioffre thereby obtained both the Principality of Squillace (1494) and the Duchy of Alvito (1497) as his wife's dowry. He lost Alvito after the death of Sancia in 1506, but managed to retain Squillace. Subsequently he married Maria de Mila, and their son Francesco Borgia inherited the Principality.

Three more Borgias ruled Squillace after Francesco: Giovanni, Pietro and, finally, Anna, after whose death the Principality passed to Francisco de Borja y Aragón and thence to his brother Fernando de Borja y Aragón. Under the Bourbons, Squillace was downgraded to a Marquisate and granted in 1755 to the Marquis Leopoldo de Gregorio, a nobleman from Messina who was to be the last feudal lord of Squillace.

== Ceramics ==
Production of highly prized terra cotta has been an important part the local economy for centuries; Cassiodorus makes several mentions of it in his writings. Squillace is the home of the pignatari style of ceramic artistry. The name is derived from the Italian word pignata, an earthenware container used for cooking beans over an open fire.

== Notable people ==
- Cassiodorus
- Florestano Pepe
- Guglielmo Pepe
