= List of manuscripts =

List of famous manuscripts

This is a list of famous manuscripts.

== Historical ==
- Carte Manuscripts
- Codex Nuttall 16th century, Mixtec
- Red Book of Hergest 14th about century, Welsh
- Voynich manuscript unknown language
- Rohonc Codex mostly known as an unknown or 19th-century attempt to forge Hungarian (Székely) Runes

== Literary ==
- Acallam na Senórach
- Banshenchas
- Leabhar Cloinne Aodha Buidhe
- Tochmarc Emire
- Yellow Book of Lecan

== Religious ==
- Akilattirattu Ammanai, 19th century
- Alexandrian text-type, 3rd century
- Arul Nool, 19th century
- Book of Armagh, 9th century
- Book of Kells, 9th century
- Book of Lismore
- Cathach of St. Columba
- Codex Amiatinus, Vulgate, c. 700
- Codex Argenteus, Gothic Bible, 6th century
- Codex Gigas, the largest manuscript of the World, 13th century
- Codex Sinaiticus, 4th century
- Codex Vaticanus Graecus 1209, 4th century
- Codex Bezae, 5th century
- Codex Washingtonianus, 4th or 5th century
- Dead Sea Scrolls
- Freising manuscripts, 10th century
- The Garland of Howth, late 9th to early 10th centuries
- Gospels of Tsar Ivan Alexander, 1355–56
- Lindisfarne Gospels, late 7th or early 8th century
- Nag Hammadi library
- Très Riches Heures du Duc de Berry early 15th century
- Uthman Qur'an, 8th century
- Utrecht Psalter, 9th century
- The Coffin Texts, 19th century BC

== Scientific ==
- Codex Leicester, 15th century
- Papyrus Graecus Holmiensis, a.k.a. Stockholm Papyrus describes some chemical processes in use in Egypt c. 1st century AD

== Other ==
- Vergilius Augusteus, Vergilius Romanus and Vergilius Vaticanus, 4th and 5th centuries
- The Great Book of Ireland, 20th century
- Book of Leinster
- Collectio canonum Hibernensis
- Trinity College, Dublin Ms 1317

== See also ==
- Illuminated manuscript
- List of Hiberno-Saxon illuminated manuscripts
- List of illuminated manuscripts
- List of Irish manuscripts
- List of New Testament papyri
- List of New Testament uncials
- List of New Testament Latin manuscripts
- Manuscript culture
- List of codices
- Book of Job in illuminated manuscripts
- List of chronicles
