= Colon (rhetoric) =

Rhetorical figure

A colon (from Greek: κῶλον, pl. κῶλα, cola) can be defined as a single unit of poetry. In textual criticism, a colon is a line consisting of a single clause. The term is most often used in the study of Hebrew poetry to refer to the fundamental unit of Hebrew poetry. A colon usually does not occur alone, but instead with one or two others to form a bicolon or a tricolon. Older terminology for the same concepts (cola = stich or hemistich, bicolon = distich, tricolon = tristich) are no longer used as often, but some newer synonyms have also appeared (colon = line or verset, bicolon = dyadic line, tricolon = triadic line).

In writing, these cola are often separated by colons. An isocolon is a sentence composed of cola of equal syllabic length.

When Jerome translated the books of the Prophets, he arranged the text colometrically. The colometric system was used in bilingual codices of New Testament, such as Codex Bezae and Codex Claromontanus. Some Greek and Latin manuscripts also used this system, including Codex Coislinianus and Codex Amiatinus.

== Examples ==
In the following case of Hebrew poetry, the bolded text represents a bicolon, with a backslash separating individual cola.

Judges 15:16: With the jawbone of a donkey / Have I mightily raged: / With the jawbone of a donkey / Have I slain a thousand men

The next example, also from Hebrew poetry, is (in its entirety) a tricolon.

Psalm 24:7: Lift up your heads, O gates: / And be lifted up, O ancient doors! / That the King of glory may come in.

The lines of the Quran may also be divided into cola. For example, both verses in Quran 2:3–4 can be considered a tricolon:

3 who believe in the Hidden / and perform prayer / and of that which We have provided for them do spend, / 4 and who believe in what was sent down to you / and what was sent down before you / and in the world to come place their trust.

== In Hebrew poetry ==
The colon is fundamental to prosody and the Hebrew poets paid strict attention to the length of their cola, as defined by the number of syllables per cola. The average number of syllables per colon, counted across nearly one-hundred psalms, is typically eight, and sometimes seven or nine. Therefore, it is apparent that the Hebrew poets counted syllables when writing their poetry. Nine is the "ceiling" because there are no psalms which have an average number of syllables per colon above that, but twelve have exactly nine. Across all Psalms, the average is 8.005, with even greater attention devoted to maintaining an average of eight in Proverbs and Job. The poets made sure to have an average of about eight, but it was not required for each individual colon to have eight syllables; a wide diversity of colon lengths is observed.

== See also ==
- Comma (rhetoric)
- Colometry

== Bibliography ==
- B.M. Metzger, The Text of the New Testament, its Transmission, Corruption and Restoration, Oxford University Press, 1992, pp. 29–30.
