= Colometry =

Scholarly technique used in linguistics

Colometry is a scholarly technique used in linguistics, particularly in the analysis of ancient texts. The name comes from the notion of Ancient Greek: κώλον (colon, pl. cola) used in the structuring of the Classical rhetorical tradition and poetry, designating a part of the verse in the latter.

== Definitions ==
In codicology, colometry is the practice used in some manuscripts to write text in "sense lines" (starting each fragment of text that corresponds to a rhetorical passage from a new line in order to simplify reading), as opposed to stichography (occasionally "stichometry"), a layout using a new line to start each verse.

During the text analysis of poetry, colometry involves examining the structure and rhythmic composition of lines to figure out their metrical patterns and stylistic functions and organize the verses accordingly. The tradition goes back at least to the Alexandrian school: the layouts of its papyri mostly align with the medieval manuscripts.

== Poetry ==
In the strictest sense, colometry is the process of splitting poetical text into periods and cola.

Period (Ancient Greek: περίοδος, periodic sentence) is an equivalent of a line, although it is often too long to publish as a line and is split into multiple lines at the cola boundaries. The period boundary can be signaled by a prosodic pause, either as a brevis-in-longo or in the form of hiatus. The other signs of the period ending are catalexis and consecutive anceps positions.

Each period is built out of cola that come in many varieties labeled with corresponding meters, like "glyconic", "anacreontic", "anapestic". Mapping of cola might be ambiguous and thus require "some judgment".

== Sources ==
- Marschall, Priscille (2020). "Refining the Criteria for Delineating Côla and Periods: Some Remarks on the First and Second Steps of "Sound Mapping"" (PDF). Neotestamentica. 54 (2): 307–328. doi:10.1353/neo.2020.0020. ISSN 2518-4628.
- Catenacci, Carmine (2016-05-04). "Pindar's Olympian 2 and 'Orphism' (with an appendix on the colometry of Pindar's text)". Ariadne: 15–32. doi:10.26248/ARIADNE.V0I20-21.269.
- Mahoney, Anne Elizabeth (2000). On the colometry of Sophocles's “Oedipus at Colonus” (PhD thesis). Boston University.
- Habinek, T.N.; University of California, B. (1985). The Colometry of Latin Prose. Classical studies. University of California Press. ISBN 978-0-520-09689-9.
