= Codex Grandior =

Large single-volume copy of the Bible in an Old Latin translation

The Codex Grandior ("Larger Codex") was a large single-volume copy of the Bible in an Old Latin translation that was made for or by Cassiodorus in the early 500s. It was one of a number of works held at his monastic foundation Vivarium, near Squillace, Italy.

This codex was probably acquired in Italy by Benedict Biscop or Ceolfrith in 678 for the library of the new monastery at Monkwearmouth–Jarrow Abbey in Northumbria, where Bede eventually realized it was the Codex Grandior, due the presence of certain illustrations. It seems that a pandect (a single codex with all the Biblical books), was regarded as a novelty by the monks, but Coelfrith as abbot and founder of several monasteries wanted a pandect in each in a public area accessible by any of the monks. The book no longer exists, but it is believed to have been the model used by the scribes at Jarrow to create the enormous Codex Amiatinus, the earliest surviving manuscript of the complete Latin Vulgate and two other pandects.
