= Amato =

- Comune
- Comune di Amato
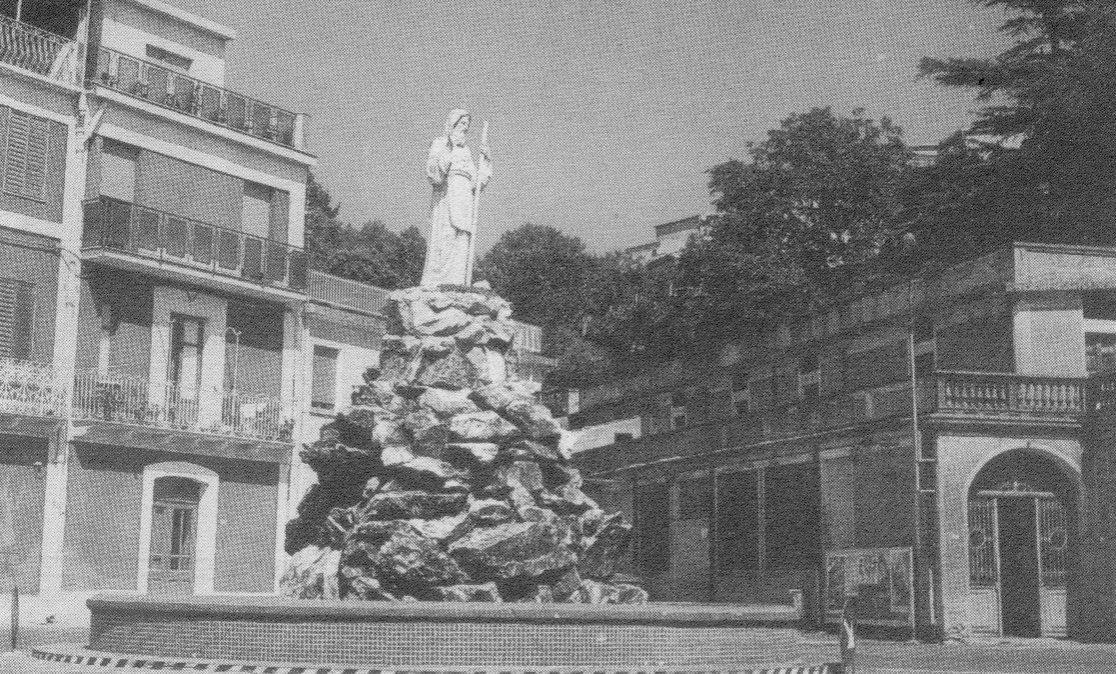

- Location of Amato in Italy Amato (Calabria)
- Coordinates: 38°56′N 16°28′E
- Country: Italy
- Region: Calabria
- Province: Catanzaro (CZ)

Government
  - Mayor: Saverio Ruga

Area
  - Total: 20 km^{2} (7.7 sq mi)
- Elevation: 480 m (1,570 ft)

Population (31 December 2013)
  - Total: 848
  - Density: 42/km^{2} (110/sq mi)
- Demonym: Amatesi
- Time zone: UTC+1 (CET)
  - Summer (DST): UTC+2 (CEST)
- Postal code: 88040
- Dialing code: 0961
- Patron saint: Francis of Paola
- Saint day: 2 April
- Website: Official website

Amato (Calabrian: Amàtu; Albanian: Amati) is an Arbëreshë comune and town in the province of Catanzaro in the Calabria region of Italy.

== History ==
Amato is one of the oldest towns in Calabria. It is mentioned by the Greek philosopher Aristotle and by the Roman Pliny the Elder in one of his books. He calls it "Sinus Lametinus" (Lametino Harbour).

It appears that the people of Amato originated from the ancient city of Lametia, on the promontory of the Gulf of Saint Euphemia, near the mouth of the Amato River. It was one of the most thriving cities of ancient Bruttium.

It was destroyed during the late age of the Western Roman Empire, the inhabitants taking shelter in the nearby Nicastro. A settlement is mentioned again only starting from the 12th century.
