= Ceolfrid Bible =

Early medieval codex

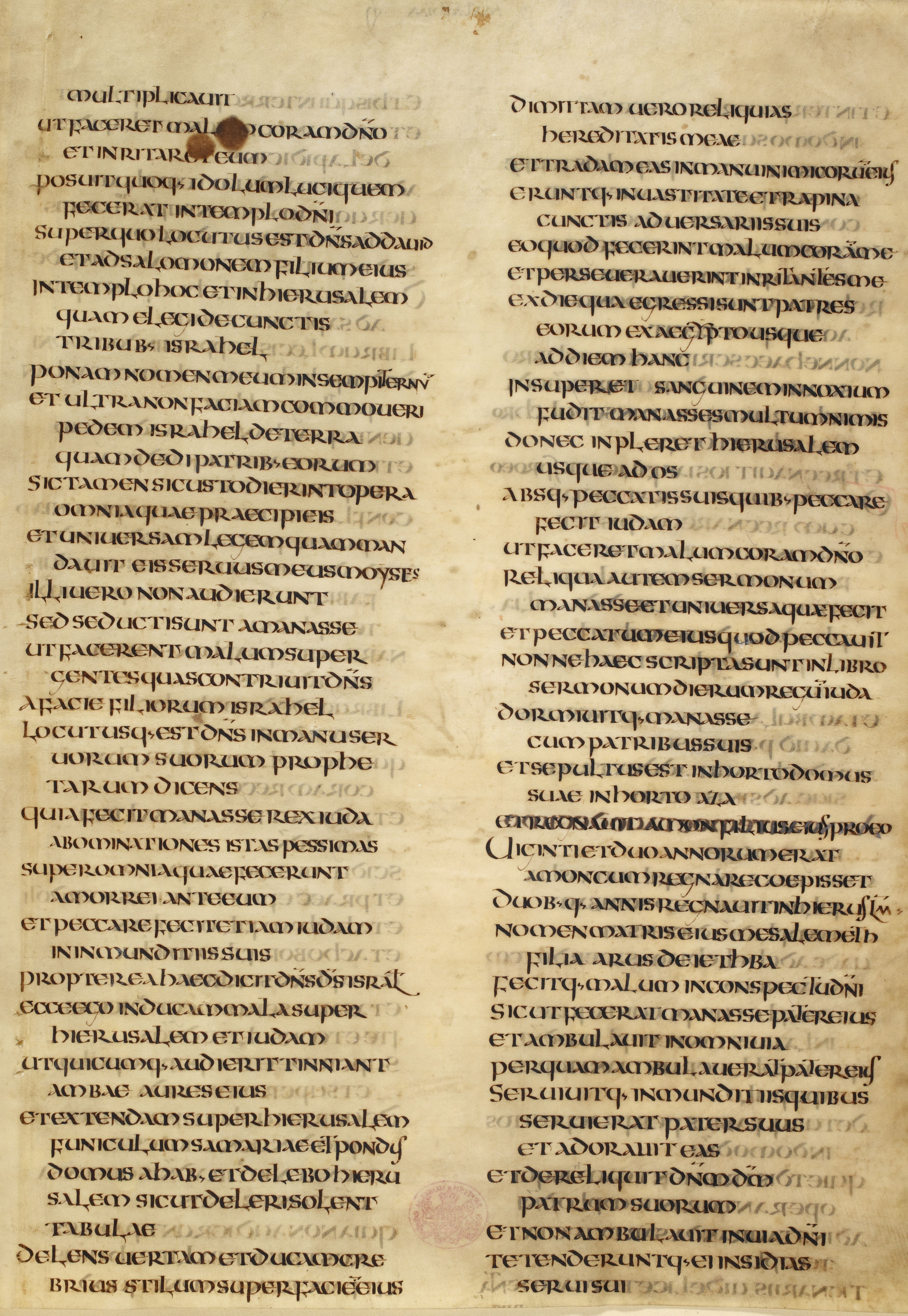
Folio 11r of the Ceolfrid Bible.

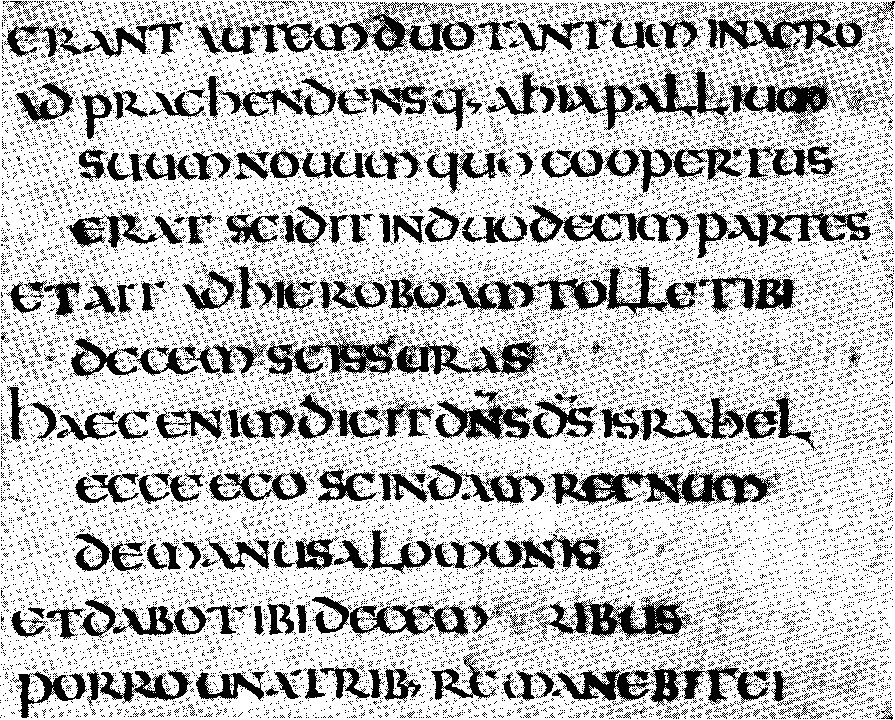
British Library Add MS 37777

The Ceolfrid Bible (London, British Library, Add MS 45025) is a fragment of a late 7th- or early 8th-century Bible. It is almost certainly a portion of one of the three single-volume Bibles ordered made by Ceolfrid, Abbot of Monkwearmouth-Jarrow. It is closely related to the Codex Amiatinus, which is the only surviving complete Bible of the three ordered by Ceolfrid. The eleven surviving vellum leaves of the manuscript contain portions of the Latin Vulgate text of the third and fourth Books of Kings.

Except for folio 11, which is missing a strip at the bottom of the leaf, the leaves are 430mm by 340mm. The text is written in two columns of 44 lines in an uncial hand. The script and the text both bear a remarkable similarity with the Codex Amiatinus, although there are some corrections in the Ceolfrid Bible not in the Codex Amiatinus. The text is arranged "per cola et commata", that is, the length of a line serves to clarify the sense of the text. The text is divided identically as the text of the Codex Amiatinus. The first lines of each chapter are written with red ink. The beginning of the Fourth Book of Kings is marked by an enlarged initial P decorated with red dots. In the margin next to the initial P there is a Chi Rho monogram flanked by the Greek letters Alpha and Omega. Punctuation was added to the text at a later date. In the 14th century modern chapter numbers were added along with a note between the end of the Third Book of Kings and the Beginning of the Fourth Book of Kings which reads Explicit Regum liber tercius. Incipit quartus. Prevaricatus est etc.

An additional single leaf, now in the British Library (Add MS 37777) contains another portion of the Third Book of Kings and shares all of the similarities shared by the Ceolfrid Bible and the Codex Amiatinus. This leaf almost certainly is either also from the Ceolfrid Bible or from the third Bible ordered made by Ceolfrid.

The leaves of the Ceolfrid Bible were used in the 16th century as covers for the Cartulary of the lands of the Willoughby family. They were afterwards preserved at Wollaton Hall in Nottinghamshire.

Add MS 37777 was discovered by Rev. William Greenwell in 1882 in a shop in Newcastle.

A third leaf was found in 1982 at Kingston Lacy, a National Trust property near Wimborne Minster in Dorset. This leaf, which came from Sirach 3-4, had been used as a covering for documents which had also come from the Willoughby family of Wollaton. The leaf is now on long-term loan to the British Library.
