= Prince of Squillace =

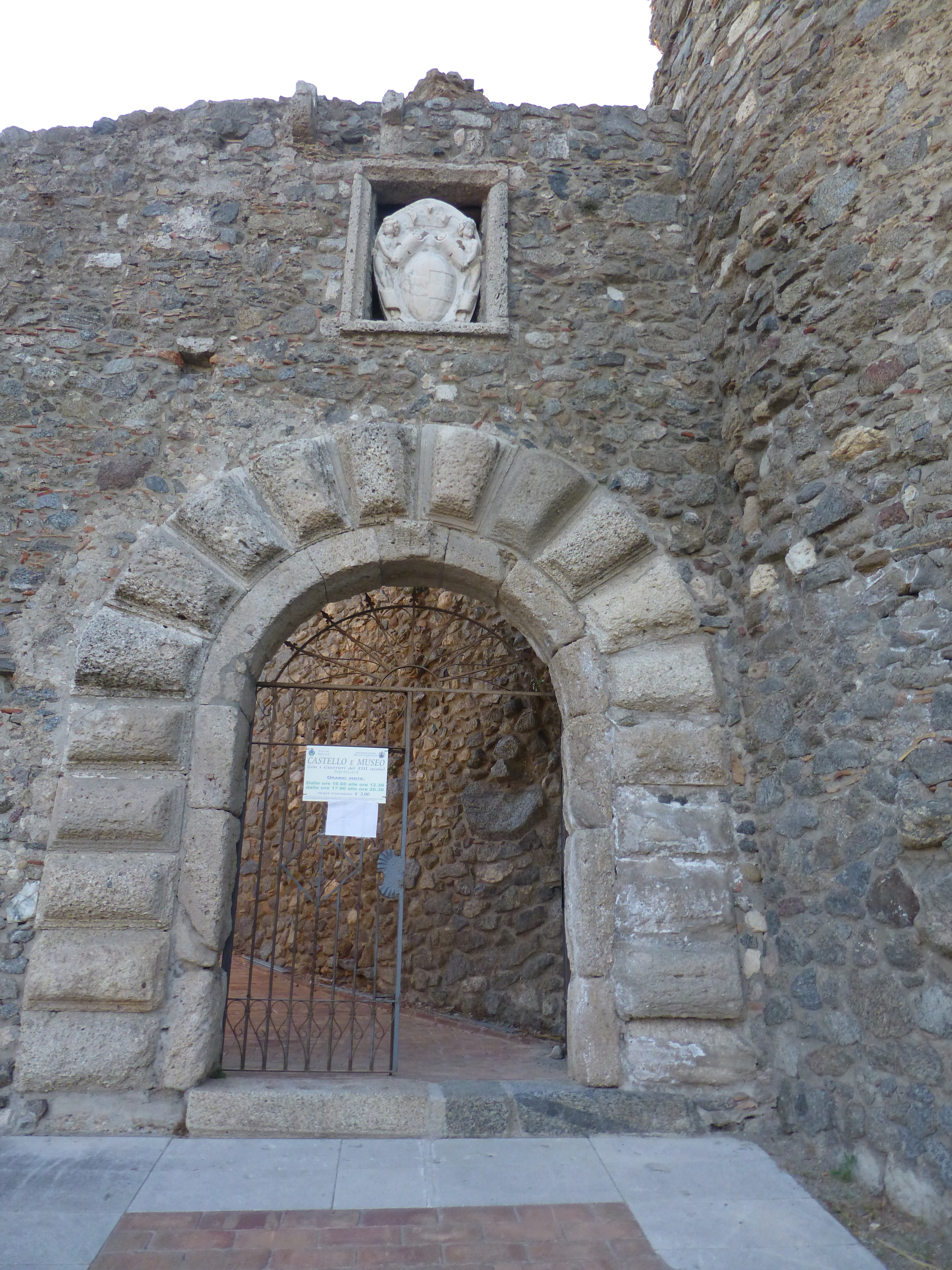
Gate of the Norman castle in Squillace

Prince of Squillace was a noble title created in 1494, by King Alfonso II of Naples (House of Trastamara) for Gioffre Borgia on the occasion of his wedding with the king's daughter Sancia d'Aragona. He was also created Count of Cariati. His second wife was María de Mila y Aragón with whom he had issue. The male line became extinct after the death of the fourth title-holder, Pietro Borgia d'Aragona, the last male heir to hold this title.

Squillace, in Calabria, was the site of an Italo-Norman castle. During the Norman (1130–94) and Swabian (1194–1266) periods of the kingdom of Sicily, it was the seat of a county. After the wars of 1266 and 1282, the county continued to be granted by the Angevin kings of Naples, while the title continued in use in Aragonese Sicily.

== Counts of Squillace ==
- Everard (Eberhard), fl. 1154–55
- Alfonso (Anfusus), fl. 1176–77, died 1188
- William of Caserta, fl. 1201

...

- Federico Lancia, 1254/56–66/68
- Philippe de Montfort, 1266/68–70
- Jean de Montfort, 1270–1300

On Jean de Montfort's death in 1300, the county of Squillace escheated to the crown.

Viscount Hugh V of Bas was appointed Count of Squillace by King Frederick III of Sicily.

== Princes of Squillace ==
- Gioffre Borgia, 1st Prince of Squillace, Count of Cariati, son of Pope Alexander VI and Vannozza dei Cattanei.
- Francesco Borgia, son of the above and his second wife, 2nd Prince of Squillace, Count of Cariati.
- Giovanni Battista Borgia, son of the above, 3rd Prince of Squillace,
- Pietro Borgia d'Aragona, son of the above, 4th Prince of Squillace, Count of Cariati.
- Ana de Borja y Pignatelli (d. 1644), daughter of the above, 5th Princess of Squillace, in 1602 married her cousin Francisco de Borja y Aragón, 2nd Count of Mayalde, Viceroy of Peru, Count of Ficalho.
- María Francisca de Borja y Borja, daughter of the above, 6th Princess of Squillace, married in 1623 her uncle Fernando de Borja y Aragón, 3rd Count of Mayalde, Viceroy of Valencia and Aragón, Count of Ficalho.
- Francisca de Borja y Aragón (d. 1693), daughter of the above, 7th Princess of Squillace, 4th Countess of Mayalde. Married twice: firstly in 1650 to Manuel de Aragón y Gurrea y Borja (d. 1653), without issue. Married again in 1654 Francisco Idiáquez-Butrón y Álava (d. 1687).
- Francisco Idiáquez Butrón Borja de Aragón, son of the above, 8th Prince of Squillace, married to Francisca Niño de Guevara. Died without issue.
- Juana María Idiáquez Butrón (d. 1712), sister of the above, 9th Princess of Squillace, 6th Countess of Mayalde, and other titles. Married, as her first husband on 21 March 1685, to Antonio Pimentel de Ibarra, 4th Marquis of Taracena.
- María Antonia Pimentel de Ibarra Idiáquez Butrón (1685–1728), daughter of the above, 7th Countess of Mayalde, 10th Princess of Squillace and other titles, married twice; in 1701 to Luis Melchor de Borja y Ponce de León Centellas y Aragón (1665-1718) and after 1718 married Carlo Giuseppe Turinett (d. 1731), without issue from either marriage

Upon the death of María Antonia in 1728, the principality of Squillace reverted to the Crown.

== Marquis of Squillace ==
- Leopoldo de Gregorio (1755–85), known in Spain as the Marqués de Esquilache

== Bibliography ==
- Cuozzo, Errico (2004). "Corona, contee e nobiltà feudale d'indomani dell'elezione di Tancredi". In Hubert Houben; Benedetto Vetere (eds.). Tancredi: conte di Lecce, re di Sicilia. Atti del Convegno Internazionale di Studio, Lecce, 19–21 febbraio 1998. Galatina. pp. 99–116.
- Dunbabin, Jean (2011). The French in the Kingdom of Sicily, 1266–1305. Cambridge University Press.
- Jamison, Evelyn Mary (1957). Admiral Eugenius of Sicily: His Life and Work and the Authorship of the Epistola Ad Petrum and the Historia Hugonis Falcandi Siculi. Oxford University Press.
- Loud, G. A.; Wiedemann, T. E. J., eds. (1998). The History of the Tyrants of Sicily by 'Hugo Falcandus', 1154–69. Manchester: Manchester University Press.
- Matthew, Donald (1992). The Norman Kingdom of Sicily. Cambridge University Press.
- Pio, Berardo (2012). "Montfort, Giovanni di". Dizionario Biografico degli Italiani. Vol. 76. Rome: Istituto dell'Enciclopedia Italiana.
- Settia, Aldo (2004). "Lancia, Federico". Dizionario Biografico degli Italiani. Vol. 63. Rome: Istituto dell'Enciclopedia Italiana.
- Soler Salcedo, Juan Miguel (2008). Nobleza Española. Grandeza Inmemorial 1520 (in Spanish). Madrid: Visión Libros. ISBN 978-84-9886-179-2.
- Williams, George L. (1998). Papal Genealogy: The Families and Descendants of the Popes. Jefferson, North Carolina: McFarland & Co. ISBN 0-7864-2071-5.
