= Manuscript culture =

Culture depending on handwritten manuscripts

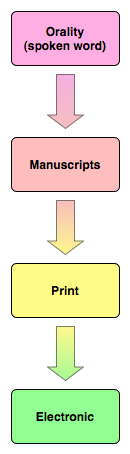
The transition of communication technology: oral culture, manuscript culture, print culture, and Information Age

A manuscript culture is a culture that depends on hand-written manuscripts to store and disseminate information. It is a stage that most developed cultures went through in between oral culture and print culture. Europe entered the stage in classical antiquity. In early medieval manuscript culture, monks or nuns copied manuscripts by hand. They copied religious works and a variety of texts including some on astronomy, herbals, and bestiaries. Medieval manuscript culture deals with the transition of the manuscript from the monasteries to the market in the cities, and the rise of universities. Manuscript culture in the cities created jobs built around the making and trade of manuscripts, and typically was regulated by universities. Late manuscript culture was characterized by a desire for uniformity, well-ordered and convenient access to the text contained in the manuscript, and ease of reading aloud. This culture grew out of the Fourth Lateran Council (1215) and the rise of the Devotio Moderna. It included a change in materials (switching from vellum to paper), and was subject to remediation by the printed book, while also influencing it.

== Medieval manuscript culture ==
=== Beginnings ===
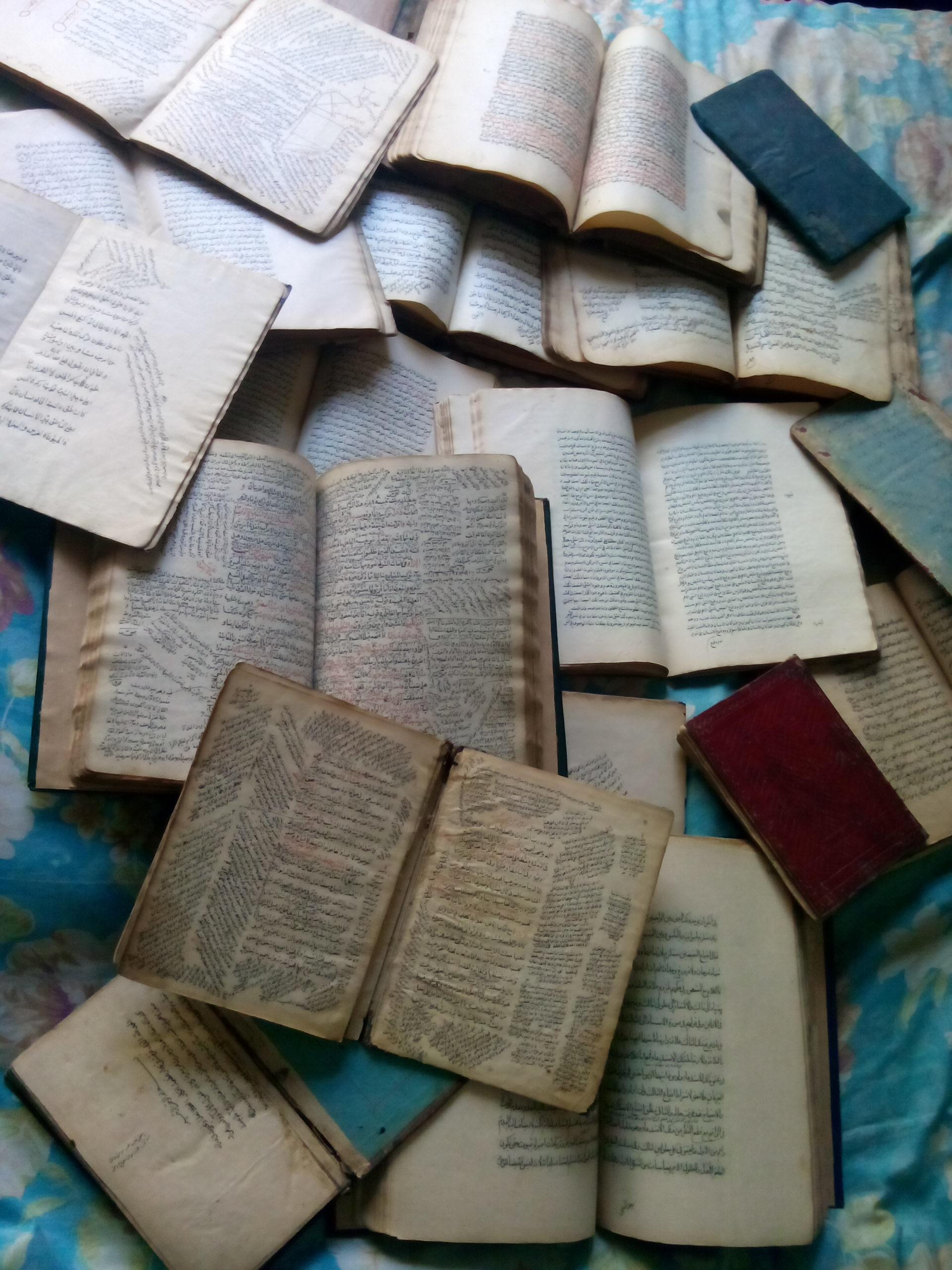
18th-century Arabic manuscripts

In Anglo-Saxon England, manuscript culture seems to have begun around the 10th century. This is not to say, however, that manuscripts and the recording of information was not important prior to the 10th century, but that during the 10th century, historians see an influx and heavier weight placed on these manuscripts. This was a time when medical practitioners were advancing what they knew about the human body and the way that certain substances interacted with it. These medical practitioners recorded this information and passed it on through the means of literate people. Catholic monasteries and cathedrals during the Middle Ages were centers of learning (see cathedral schools), so it would only make sense for these texts to end up in the hands of the monks.

These monks would meticulously record the information presented in the texts, but not mindlessly. In the case of herbals, for instance, there is evidence that the monks improved upon some texts, retracted textual errors, and made the text particularly relevant to the area in which they lived. Some monasteries even went so far as to grow some of the plants included in the texts, which was due in part to their intimate understanding of their local herbs. This is important to note because it demonstrated the practical uses of these texts in the lives of the monks. They had little room, or patience for that matter, to disseminate the imaginary plants and fanciful texts that are so commonly imagined in the minds of those who think of this era. The writers truly restricted themselves to only include practical information. This was a time when plants and botany were linked closely with medicine and herbal remedies.

In the case of bestiaries, similarly to herbals, the monks generally copied and cited previous texts to pass them on. Unlike the herbals, the monks could not grow an animal in their garden, so largely the information taken from the bestiaries was taken at face value. The consequence of this is that the writers were free to elaborate and embellish upon texts. This was a definite and deliberate attempt to give the animal in question a certain moral or allegorical meaning beyond the physical appearance. These bestiary texts can be very like traditional mythology.

=== Trade ===
In the 13th century, Paris was the first city to have a large commercial trade of manuscripts, with manuscript-book producers being commissioned to make specific books for specific people. Paris had a large enough population of wealthy literate persons to support the livelihood of people producing manuscripts. This medieval era marks the shift in manuscript production from monks in monasteries to booksellers and scribes making a living from their work in the cities.

Flourished initial L

Individuals did scribal work, but collaboration has been suggested. Commercial workshops or ateliers operated out of Paris during this time, often collaborating on jobs. Research from François Avril, Joan Diamond and others has confirmed that two or more artists alternated, or otherwise shared, in the illumination of a single manuscript; however, the detailed logistics of this work remain unclear.

Most medieval scribes gathered together as they copied, but some separated books into sections to copy them in parts. Previously in the monasteries, work was broken up between scribes and illuminators; examples exist where the scribe would leave space for and write out a small cursive letter at the beginning of a new paragraph, which was then painted in at a later time by the illuminator.

=== Pecia system ===
The pecia system was developed in Italian university cities by the beginning of the 13th century and became a regulated procedure at the University of Paris in the second half of the century. The pecia system broke up the book into sections called peciae. Individuals – such as students – would rent them, section by section, to copy. The peciae were generally four folios long which allowed for a fast turn-over rate for each pecia for students to exchange. Under this system, a larger number of copiers, working simultaneously, could produce a copy in a significantly shorter amount of time than a single person working alone.

Detail of pecia mark

The original collection of peciae for a book from which all future copies will be based is called the exemplar. The process of making an exemplar was supposed to be an orderly procedure: Masters of the university who compiled a new work were to edit, correct, and submit this authentic text to a stationer; he in turn copied from it an exemplar in peciae, corrected these against the author's text with utmost care, and finally submitted them to the inspection of the university's delegates for approval and for the setting of a rental price. Only then were peciae available for rental and copy.

In reality, it came down to the stationer – part of whose job was renting out peciae – finding and offering for rental the works which he thought would be demanded. This pressure on the stationers prompted them to acquire exemplars in as good a state and in as short a time as possible. The emphasis was on speed of acquisition instead of the quality of the product. If a certain work seemed likely to become a "best seller", a stationer would make a copy of the best text immediately available, and would have his exemplar-peciae corrected, as well, as time permitted. At times, the stationer sought the text; at other times, it was the author who offered his newly completed work to the stationer, but it was never the university as a formal body which made requests or developed what was to be offered.

=== Booksellers in Paris ===
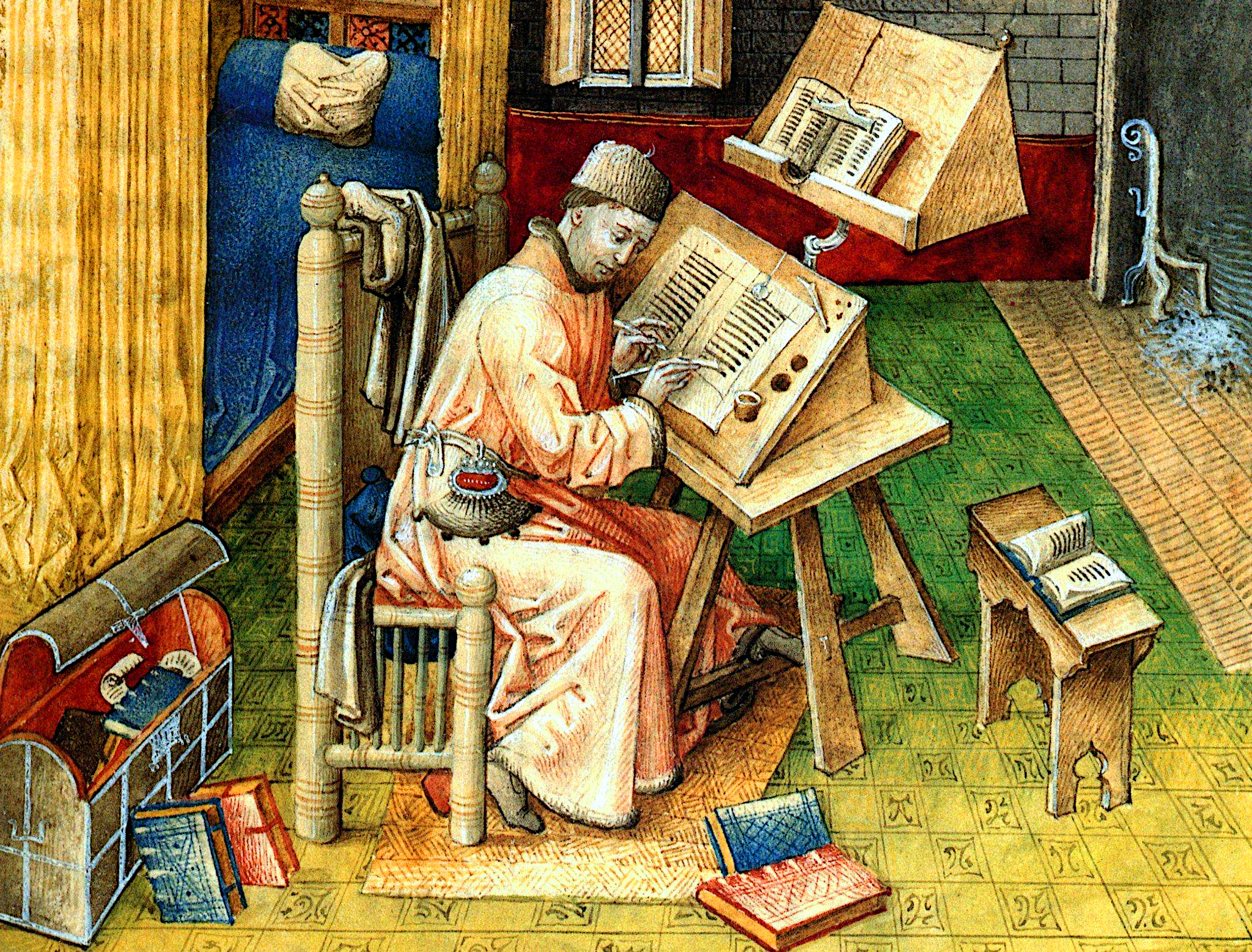
The scribe Jean Miélot at work

King Philip the Fair of France, 1285–1314, instituted a 0.4% commercial tax on all goods. In 1307 the King exempted all the librarii universitatis from paying the commercial tax, the taille. This exemption privileged the French universities over the booksellers because if they did not swear the oath they would not be exempt from the tax.

Librarius is a general term while stationarius refers to one specific kind of librarius. Librarius can mean anything from scribe to bookseller to librarian. Stationarius or stationer refers to those types of librarius who rented out peciae. Both types, however, were involved in the secondhand trade, produced new books, and were regulated by the university. The sole distinction between them was the stationer's added service of renting out pecia.

==== Restrictions ====
The oaths that the librarii or booksellers had to swear to the universities to obey their regulations and requirements for the tax exemption were extremely restrictive in regard to the resale of secondhand books. They were supposed to act more like intermediaries between the seller and the buyer while their profit was limited to essentially four pence per pound. They were further required to display the secondhand books prominently in their shops, give a professional assessment of the likely price of the books submitted to them, and put would-be buyers in direct contact with the seller.

The bookseller had to swear not to underpay when buying and not to overcharge when selling. The stationers rented out copies of useful texts, one quire at a time, so students and masters could make their own copies. Both fees were regulated by the university. Both kinds of booksellers had to guarantee their compliance to their oath by posting a bond of 100 pence.

A monk inspecting a sheet of parchment which he is buying from a parchment-maker

It was not just the booksellers which the universities regulated. Additionally, university regulations forbade parchmenters from hiding the good parchment from university members wanting to buy. There were plenty of other demands for parchment outside the university such as: the record-keeping for the royal government, every similar entity of a commercial or mercantile guild, every religious house that issued a charter or kept a rent roll, every public letter-writer, everyone from major international trader to local shop-keeper who kept accounts. They all demanded parchment in greater numbers and were willing to pay higher than the regulated price which the university members paid. As such, the universities feeling such pressures often chose to regulate parchment as well.

==== Benefits ====
While there were multiple restrictions on the bookseller, the job did have its benefits. The bookseller was free to produce and sell books, illuminate, or write for anyone they pleased like the Court, cathedral, or the wealthy laymen of the capital and provinces so long as they met their obligations to the university to which they had sworn oaths. In fact, most of their trade fell outside of the university regulation. There is an important distinction between the regulation of how books were traded within the university and how the booksellers were able to charge whatever the open market would bear. To the non-student or masters, there were no such restrictions on the booksellers. Between 1300–1500, the position of libraire was a closed position only open upon the resignation or death of a previous one. Aside from cheap books, it was only the libraire who was allowed to sell books in Paris. The university essentially guaranteed a monopoly on the sale of books for booksellers.

== Late manuscript culture ==
=== Characteristics ===
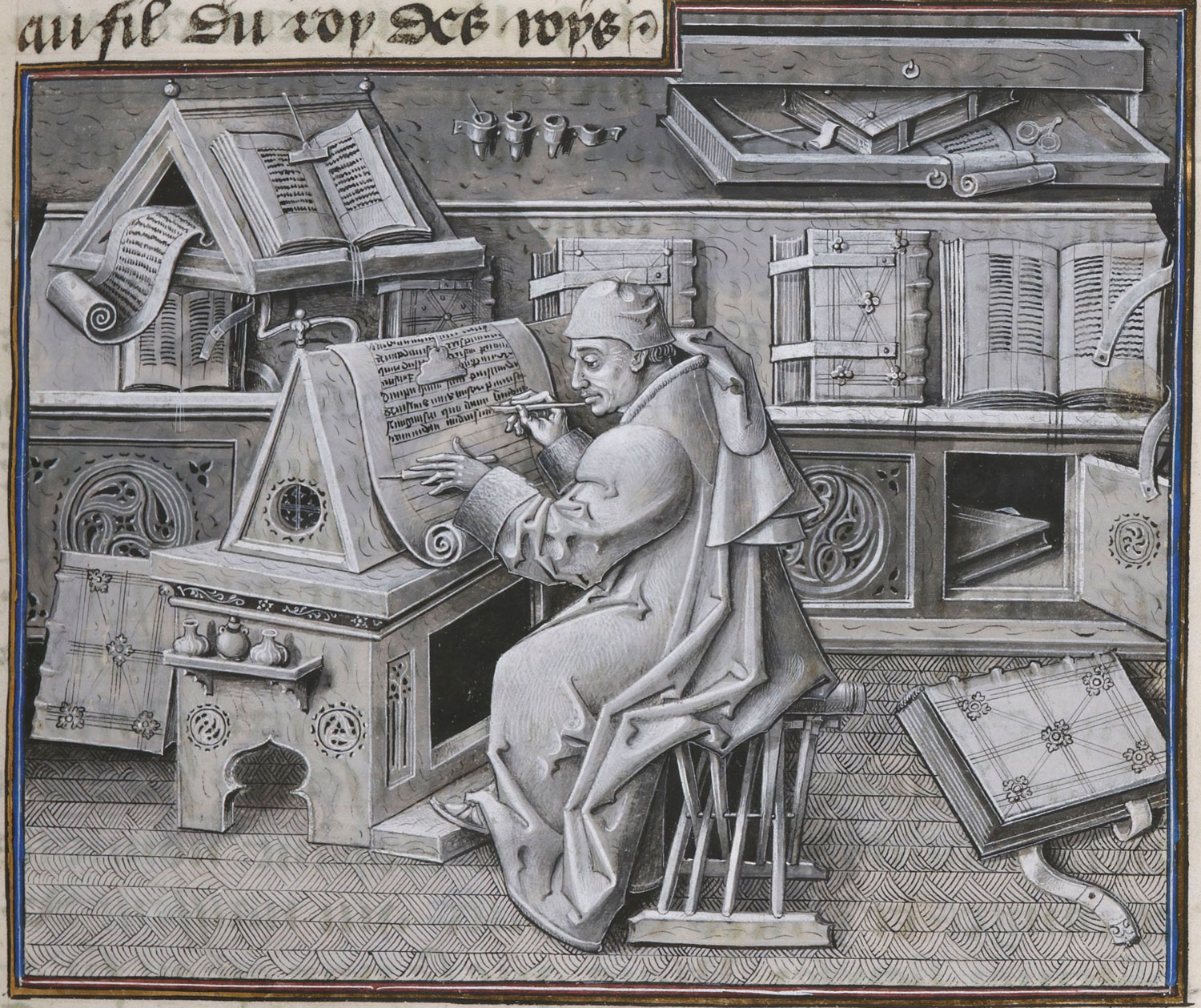
An author portrait of Jean Miélot writing his compilation of the Miracles of Our Lady, one of his popular works

The period of late manuscript culture dates from roughly the mid-14th century to the 15th century, preceding and existing alongside the printing press. While embodying all of the ideals and adhering to the regulations observable in the Devotio Moderna, there are multiple clear characteristics of late manuscript culture. For instance, careful attention was paid to the punctuation and layout of texts, with readability and specifically reading aloud taking preeminence. Meaning had to be clear in every sentence, with as little room left to interpretation as possible (compared to the lack of spaces in text and any markings for the purpose of aiding in enunciation), due to preachings' rise in popularity after the Fourth Lateran Council. Correct orthography was attempted whenever the necessary exemplars made it possible to emend earlier texts, especially Bibles, and this correction made many texts uniform. In this period of manuscript culture, the emendatiora, manuscripts which combined surviving texts of the oldest available exemplars with the manuscripts that had been currently acceptable and prominent, were created.

Aids to find one's way about the text are prominent features in these manuscripts. While none were invented solely in the 15th century, they were used with increasing frequency and became more complex. These include:

- tables of contents
- lists of chapters, either at the beginning of each book or gathered at the beginning of the whole work (if it is a collection of works)
- running headlines
- extensively detailed colophons
- page numbers in Arabic numerals
- the appearance of subject indexes

Other changes included the enlargement of the rubric from one to two lines in the university manuscript to eight or ten, and the distinction of it by separate letter-form. The rubric also changed in regard to the categories of information included in it. An earlier rubric might have contained a title of the particular section or article, and a description of the ending of the preceding one. A 15th century rubric would add information about the translator or translators, and the original writer if they were not particularly well known. A brief description of their content, or even detailed information considering the date or conditions of the work's creation is also occasionally seen, though not as frequently. These changes exemplify the desire for uniformity, ease of access, and strict regulation of a given work and its subsequent correction. These are many of the same goals attributed to the uniformity exemplified by the printing press.

=== Production of manuscripts at the beginning of the 15th century ===
The emergence of new standards in manuscript production, beginning in the Low Countries at the end of the 14th century, clearly marked the beginning of a new epoch in manuscript culture. Uniformity would result from the desire for clarity, both in terms of bibliographic accuracy and the reproduction and correction of the text itself. It necessitated greater organization, specifically within the monastic scriptoria. These had lost pre-eminence in medieval manuscript culture, characterized by the university, but had begun to undergo a rebirth in the fourteenth century. Historians have characterized this period as chaotic, with poor quality paper manuscripts being held as a standard. However, the varying quality of materials did not affect the quality of the text contained on it, as the transition was made from parchment to rag paper. For instance, there was the formation of a new script, called hybrida, that sought to combine the traditional cursiva script with the script used in printed books. There was little loss of legibility, due to the use of sharp angles instead of loops. Additionally, in the first half of the 15th century, the practice of using a hierarchy of scripts to demarcate different sections of a text was re-instituted. Rubrics and colophons were clearly set off from the remainder of a text, employing their own unique script. All of these changes resulted from a desire for improved accuracy, and led to the creation of complex codification rules.

=== Uniformity amidst variety ===
A number of manuscripts were produced that had differences in terms of size, layout, script, and illumination. They were based on the same text while being created by multiple different scribes. Yet, they were meticulously corrected, to the point that very few differences in terms of the text itself can be observed among them. This implied not only the presence of a direct authority that maintained some sort of direction over the scribes, but also a newfound pursuit of scholarly accuracy that had not been present with the university book sellers. It was emphasized by the new religious orders that had been created in the 14th century. Correction and emendation would be held in the same esteem as copying itself.

=== Codification rules and the Opus Pacis ===
Written in 1428 by the German Carthusian, Oswald de Corda, prior of the Grand Chartreuse, the Opus Pacis consisted of two parts. One dealt primarily with orthography and accent, where Oswald stated that his motive in creating these codification rules was to dispel the anxiety of his fellow Carthusians. Some members of the order were worried about the omission of single letters, not just phrases, words or syllables within copies of a given text (demonstrating the new concern for uniformity taken to an extreme). It is clear that his audience was composed of scribes, specifically those meticulous to "the verge of neurosis". He seeks to reinforce the importance of older statutes regarding manuscript production, such as the Carthusian statutes, and the way in which he seeks to correct them.

==== Statuta Nova of 1368 ====
Oswald specifically wanted to reform the Statuta Nova of 1368. It stated no one could emend copies of the Old and New Testament, unless they were doing so against exemplars that had been prescribed by their order. Anyone who corrected texts in a manner inconsistent with those exemplars was publicly acknowledged to have corrupted the text, and subsequently punished. Oswald answered this with his Work of Peace, and stated that correctors should not engage in pointless labor by over-correcting. In it, he described correction not as a command, but an indulgence. It was practiced for the improvement and glorification of a text, and though it followed a set of rules, they were not so strict as to stifle emendation. This was a transition from older works with large numbers of lists and regulations that mandated every action a scribe could take in correction, and had been widely ignored in medieval print culture. Oswald rejected a system in which one must simply pick a single exemplar and correct according to it, or reproduce portions of texts which the scribe knew to be in error due to a proper exemplar not being attainable. Before Oswald, a number of people believed these were the only available options under the older, strict rules.

==== New rules of corrections ====
Oswald specifically made sure to outline the proper way of correcting various readings of the same text, as observed in varying exemplars. He stated that scribes should not instantly correct according to one or the other, but deliberate, and use proper judgment. Oswald also said that in the case of bibles, scribes should not immediately modernize archaic spellings, because this had produced further variation within texts. Oswald also detailed a uniform set of abbreviations. However, he stated that scribes should recognize national differences, particularly in light of the Great Schism. Scribes were right to correct texts with different dialects of Latin, especially if they were using archaic forms of Latin verbs, however.

==== Valde Bonum ====
In his prologue to the Opus Pacis, Oswald contrasts his work with the Valde Bonum, an earlier handbook compiled during the Great Schism. It had attempted to set forth universal spellings for the Bible, and stated that the corrector need not emend to conform to an exemplar from a given region based on its perceived superiority, but could rather take local regional practice as a standard. It acknowledged that centuries of use, and transmission from nation to nation, had an effect on various spellings. He incorporated a number of these elements into his Opus Pacis, which was copied and put to practical use, and had spread from Germany as far north as Ireland. By the 1480s, it had become a standard, specifically for the Devotio Moderna and the Reformed Benedictines. Opus Pacis became a generic term for any work of its kind. The last surviving copy was written in 1514, indicating that manuscript correction remained an important subject sixty years into the printed era.

=== Manuscript as a vehicle for preaching ===
It was in late manuscript culture that the written page took on a renewed meaning to religious communities. Scriptorias of Benedictine, Cistercian and Augustinian houses had resumed after being suppressed by the production of university and mendicant books. Particularly, these scriptoria exemplified the idea that one shall live by the fruit of one's labors. Writing sacred books was the most fitting, suitable and pious task that one could undertake to do so. Copying these books was also equivalent to preaching with one's hands. Sermons were only of moderate importance in the 13th century. By the 15th century, after the emphasis placed on preaching in the Fourth Lateran Council, they were of the utmost importance. The formation and expansion of preaching orders led to the proliferation of pastoral theology in schools, and preaching was now an indispensable part of the sacraments. Uniform manuscripts with multiple tools made for ease of reference, reading, and enunciation became necessary.

The Devotio Moderna and the reformed Benedictines relied on reading devotional texts for instruction, and the written word was raised to a high level of importance not afforded by earlier religious movements. The writing was just as important as the word. In fact, monasteries bought a number of printed books, becoming the main market for the early printing press, precisely because of this devotion to preaching. Without the Devotio Moderna and orders that followed their example, the need for texts and printers would not have been present. Printing had exploded in Germany and the Low Countries, the home of the Devotio Moderna and Reformed Benedictines, as opposed to England and France. They were also the home to the beginnings of late manuscript culture, because of the common desire for uniformity. Johannes Trithemius protested the invasion of the library by the printed book because of the missing aspect of devotion that had been present in preaching with one's hands. With the preaching possible as a scribe, manuscripts had a function that was lacking in a printed book, though both possessed a greater degree of uniformity than earlier manuscripts.

=== Manuscripts and the arrival of print ===
By roughly 1470, the transition from handwritten books to printed ones had begun. The book trade, in particular, underwent drastic changes. By this point German printing presses had reached the northernmost regions of Europe, specifically Paris. By 1500, print had stopped imitating manuscripts and manuscripts were imitating print. In the reign of Francis I (1515–1547) for instance, the king's handwritten manuscripts were based on Roman type. While quality rag paper had appeared before the arrival of the printing press, it was at this time that parchmenters lost most of their business. Paper was not only acceptable, it was preferable, and printers and scribes had both ceased to use parchment altogether. A number of libraries decried these changes, because of the loss in individuality and subtlety that resulted. Multiple printed books and manuscripts were even created with the same paper. The same watermarks are often observable on them, that signified the particular paper dealer who created it.

Manuscripts were still written and illuminated well into the 16th century, some dating to just before 1600. Illuminators continued to work on various manuscripts, specifically the Book of Hours. The Book of Hours had been the most commonly produced manuscript from the 1450s onward, and was among the last manuscripts created. By the 16th century, however, manuscripts were mostly illuminated by artists retained by nobles or royals. Their work was required (and manuscripts were created) only for unusual occasions, such as noble or royal births, weddings, or other extraordinary occurrences. The number of copyists had greatly declined, as these types of manuscripts were not intended for mass, or even student, consumption.

The traditional organization of book production fell apart; they were made up of libraries doling out quires to scribes and illuminators, who lived in proximity. The new, specialized system based on patronage did not support them. Libraries, and not scribes, turned into printers, and served as a link between late manuscript culture and print culture. They had possessed reserves of manuscripts, and slowly supplemented them with printed books, until printed books dominated their collections. However, the cost and risks involved in making books greatly increased with the transition to print. Still, Paris and more northern areas of Europe (especially France) had been the foremost center of manuscript production, and remained a force in the printed book market, falling only behind Venice.

==== Manuscript descent and exemplars ====
There were accounts of scribes working in a similar manner in comparison to their rival printers, though the process was still subtly different. The pages on sheets of vellum were folded together to form a quire before the invention of printing or paper, and printed books also bound multiple quires to form a codex. They were simply made of paper. Manuscripts were also used as exemplars for printed books. Lines were counted off based on the exemplar and marked in advance, while the typesetting reflected the layout of the manuscript's text. Within a few generations, however, printed books were used as new exemplars. This process created various "family trees", as many printed sources would be double checked against earlier manuscripts if the quality was deemed too low. This necessitated the creation of stemma, or lines of descent among books. This made manuscripts gain a new significance, as sources to find earlier authority or a better authority, in comparison to the published version of a text. Erasmus, for instance, attained authoritative manuscripts from the medieval period due to his dissatisfaction with printed Bibles.

=== Christine de Pizan and humanist illumination ===
The Epistre Othea or Letter of Othea to Hector, composed in 1400, symbolized the murky transition from manuscript culture to the Renaissance and humanistic print culture. It was a retelling of the classical story of Othea through an illuminated manuscript, though it conveyed a number of humanistic Renaissance ideas. Created by Christine de Pizan, its patron was Louis of Orleans, heir to the French throne. It contained over 100 images, and each chapter opened with the image of a mythological figure or event. It also contained short narrative verses, and text addressed to Hector. Each prose passage contained a labeled gloss, and attempted to interpret a humanistic lesson from the myth. Every gloss closed with a quote from an ancient philosopher. Additionally, other short prose passages called allegories concluded a section. They conveyed lessons applicable to the soul, and a Latin Bible quotation.

Christine de Pizan combined contemporary images through illumination with new humanistic values typically associated with print. Her work was based on Ovid's, and a number of Ovidian myths were traditionally illuminated, in the medieval period. She also incorporated astrology, Latin texts, and a wide variety of classical mythology in fleshing out Ovid's account, maintaining her humanist motivations. This contradiction also led to the use of illuminatio, or the practice of using light as color. Her Othea is a bricolage, restructuring tradition while not trying to create a new master work. It was done in the style of an ordinatio, or layout that emphasized the meaning of the organization of images.

The Othea reflected a late manuscript culture that was defined by violence, action, and gender challenges within literature. Anger was depicted in relation to gender, and marked "a departure from the Aristotelian tradition". Women were no longer driven into mindless frenzies, but possessed anger that developed from fully considered character interactions. The Epistre Othea remained Christine's most popular work, despite the fact that multiple versions existed. Because of the fluid nature of manuscript reproduction, specifically in the case of illumination (as opposed to the text), the visual experience was not uniform. Each exemplar incorporated diverse cultural elements, with some having entirely different philosophical and theological implications. Only later reproductions that used woodcuts to reproduce the images created a truly authorial version of the manuscript. It also owed its very existence to the printing press in the first instance, because bibles were now relegated to the press, leaving nonreligious texts available for detailed illumination.

=== Constructing an Auctor with Chaucer ===
==== William Caxton ====
While using medieval manuscripts as exemplars, multiple printers attempted to implant humanist values into the text. They attempted to create a uniform work, displaying a number of similarities in terms of motivation with the Devotio Moderna. Early editors and publishers needed definitive works to define a culture. William Caxton (1415~1424–1492), an editor, was instrumental in shaping English culture and language, and did so through his authoritative Works of Geoffrey Chaucer. Caxton was a transitional figure, who sought to close the gap between manuscript culture and a more humanistic print culture through Chaucer's work. Specifically, Caxton attempted to make Chaucer appear similar to classical writers and continental poets.

==== Chaucer as humanist ====
Caxton attempted to make Chaucer into an English Petrarch or Virgil, and realized that new humanistic 16th century versions of his work had to recognize fourteenth century versions. His Chaucer transcended medieval ideals, and became timeless, conforming to humanistic ideals. This required construction of a literary genealogy referred to older medieval exemplars. Through his editing, Chaucer was framed as an early promoter of the Renaissance, who decried Gothic and medieval culture, and who rescued the English language.

he by hys labour enbelysshyd/ornated and made faire our englisshe/in thys Royame was had rude speche & Incongrue/as yet it appiereth by olde bookes/whych at thys day ought not to haue place ne be compared emong ne to hys beauteuous volumes/and aournate writynges

— Mayer, p. 123, William Caxton

==== Caxton and the flaws of "Olde Bookes" ====
Caxton wanted to discard "old bookes" that were characteristic of medieval culture. To do this, he modernized older terms and introduced Latinate spellings. He removed the influence of manuscript culture, that allowed the reader to have some textual authority. Caxton believed that printed books could set a defined authorship, in which the reader would not feel it appropriate to change the text or add glosses. He believed that cheap versions of this authorial Chaucer would allow a diverse group of readers to develop common economic and political ideals, unifying the culture of England. He was the exemplum for the English standard. His version of Chaucer was well liked by Henry VII of England, who decided to spread it in order to help provide England with a common cultural background.

==== Changing perceptions of the book ====
To most people in the late age of manuscript culture, books were codices first, vehicles for text, regardless of whether they were printed or handwritten. The cost of obtaining them determined the standard, and printed books gradually gained precedence. William Caxton stated that his readers could have them "good cheap", and that the quality of text was improved, if not equaled, in print. Catalogues from the period do list both kinds indiscriminately. However, in auctions a careful distinction was made between the two, as anything handwritten fetched a higher price.

=== Popular assumptions and historical revision ===
Many scholars of print culture, as well as classicists, have argued that inconsistencies existed among manuscripts due to the blind copying of texts and a static manuscript culture that (specifically medieval manuscript culture) existed during the rise of the printing press. They have stated that once a mistake was made, it would be repeated endlessly and compounded with further mistakes by refusing to deviate from the previous exemplar, thus exposing an obvious advantage of print. The noted classicist E.J. Kenney, whose work formed much of the early scholarship on this issue, stated that "medieval authors, scribes, and readers had no notion of emending a text, when they were confronted with an obvious error in their exemplars, other than by slavishly copying the readings of another text". There was a great diversity among them in terms of changes in style and a willingness to deviate from prior exemplars, however, as observed in one copy of copy of Jerome's Epistolae Morale, compared to another copy of Cicero's Letters, both dating from the 16th century. Some historians and specifically medievalists argue that the late 14th and 15th centuries demonstrated reforms that accommodated many of the functions associated with print. A number of classicists also naturally looked to reproductions of classical texts during the period, which were not necessarily characteristic of other work that was deemed more important. Universality and uniformity, medievalists believe, was seen among some late manuscripts, along with other changes typically associated with the printed book.

Much of the recent scholarship on late manuscript culture was specifically generated by Elizabeth Eisenstein, a key print culture scholar, and arguably creator of the "print culture" model. Eisenstein argued that the invention of the printing press eventually led to the Renaissance, and the social conditions necessary for its occurrence. The printing press allowed readers to free themselves from multiple limitations of the manuscript. She did not detail the state of manuscript and scribal culture in the late 14th and 15th centuries, however. She described in depth the conditions present in Germany at the time of the printing presses' invention in Mainz, and detailed the scribal culture in England and France in order to compare print culture and manuscript culture. She did not describe Italian humanists in Florence and renewed religious orders of the Modern Devotion in the Low Countries and Germany. These included the Windesheim Congregation, of which Oswald de Corda was a member. Multiple medievalists, specifically Mary A. Rouse and Richard H. Rouse, responded by attempting to create a more detailed account of late manuscript culture, and defined its distinctive characteristics. This is part of the belief that changes occurred during the period that print culture scholars, such as Eisenstein, ignored.

== See also ==
- Book
- Codex
- Illuminated manuscripts
- List of Hiberno-Saxon illustrated manuscripts
- List of manuscripts
- List of New Testament papyri
- List of New Testament uncials
- Manuscript
- Manuscript format
- Manuscript processing
- Scriptorium
