= Borgia, Calabria =

Borgia Παλαγόριο (Greek)
- Comune
- Comune di Borgia
- Coat of arms

- Location within Italy Location within Calabria
- Coordinates: 38°50′N 16°30′E
- Country: Italy
- Region: Calabria
- Province: Catanzaro (CZ)
- Frazioni: Roccelletta, Vallo

Government
  - Mayor: Elisabeth Sacco

Area
  - Total: 42 km^{2} (16 sq mi)
- Elevation: 341 m (1,119 ft)

Population (31 December 2013)
  - Total: 7,591
  - Density: 180/km^{2} (470/sq mi)
- Demonym: Borgesi
- Time zone: UTC+1 (CET)
  - Summer (DST): UTC+2 (CEST)
- Postal code: 88021
- Dialing code: 0961
- Patron saint: San Giovanni Battista
- Saint day: 24 June
- Website: Official website

Borgia is a town and comune in the province of Catanzaro, in the Calabria region of southern Italy.

The ancient city of Scylletium was located in the frazione of Roccelletta of Borgia.
