= Codex Amiatinus =

Anglo-Saxon copy of c. 700 of the Vulgate Bible

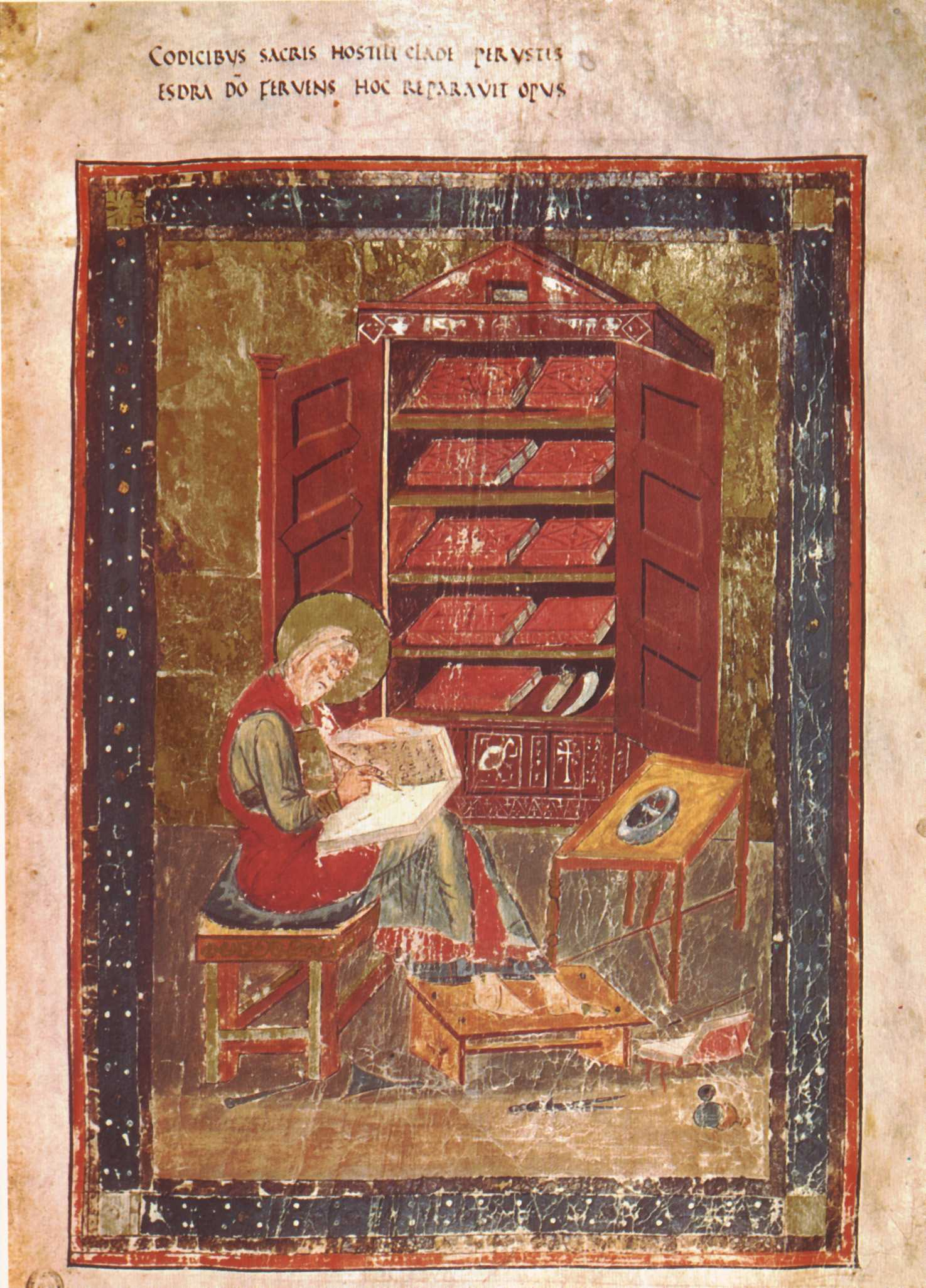
Portrait of Ezra, from folio 5r at the start of Old Testament, is "the oldest English painting to which an absolute date can be assigned (i.e. not after 716)."

The Codex Amiatinus, also known as the Jarrow Codex, is considered the best-preserved manuscript of the Latin Vulgate version of the Christian Bible. It was produced around 700 in the northeast of England, at the Benedictine Monkwearmouth–Jarrow Abbey in the Kingdom of Northumbria, now South Tyneside. It was one of three giant single-volume Bibles then made at Monkwearmouth–Jarrow, and is the earliest complete one-volume Latin Bible to survive, only the León palimpsest being older. It is the oldest Bible where all the biblical canon present what would be their Vulgate texts. In 716 it was taken to Italy as a gift for Pope Gregory II. It is named after the location in which it was found in modern times, Monte Amiata in Tuscany, at the Abbazia di San Salvatore and is now kept at Florence in the Biblioteca Medicea Laurenziana (Laurentian Library).

Designated by siglum A, it is commonly considered to provide the most reliable surviving representation of Jerome's Vulgate text for the books of the New Testament, and most of the Old Testament. As was standard in all Vulgate Bibles until the ninth century, the Book of Baruch is absent as is the Letter of Jeremiah, the text of the Book of Lamentations following the end of Jeremiah without a break. Ezra–Nehemiah is presented as a single book, the texts of the canonical Book of Ezra and Book of Nehemiah being continuous. Similarly the books of Samuel, Kings and Chronicles are each presented as a single book.

== Description ==
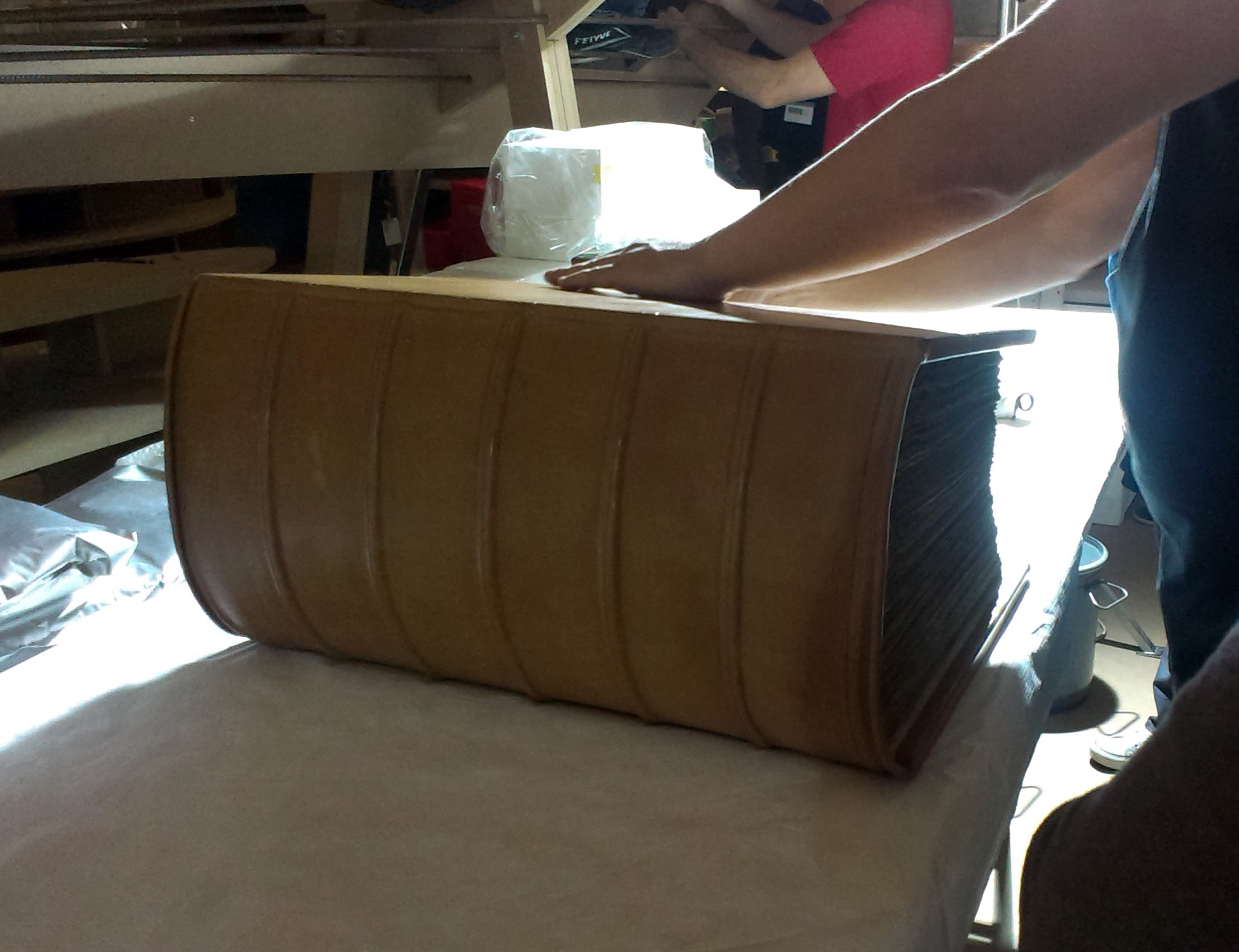
The bulk of the Codex

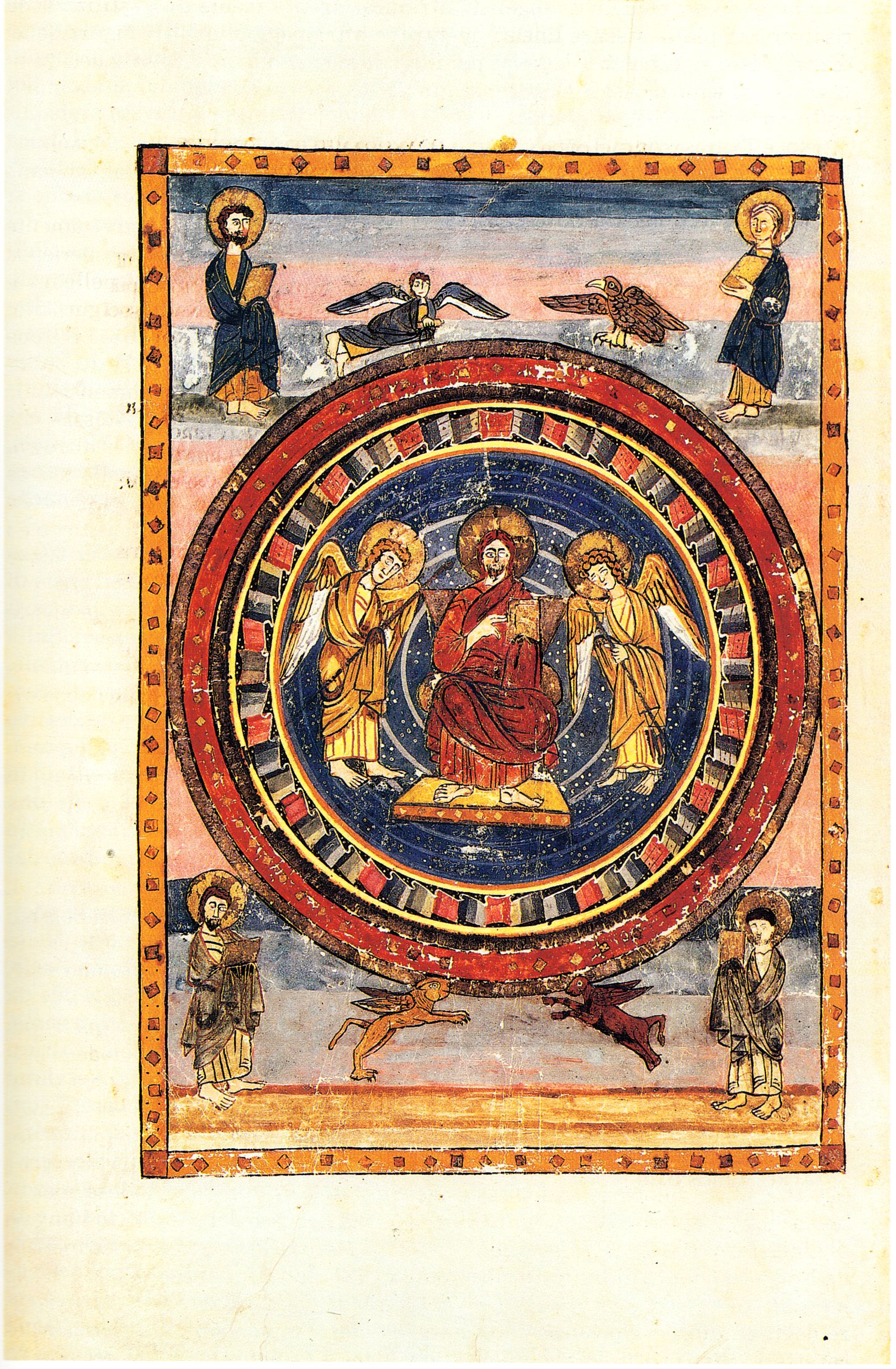
Maiestas Domini (Christ in Majesty) with the Four Evangelists and their symbols, at the start of the New Testament (fol. 796v)

The designated siglum for the manuscript in most critical editions is written am or A (Wordsworth). It is preserved in an immense tome, measuring 19 1/4 inches (49 cm) high, 13 3/8 inches (34 cm) in breadth, and 7 inches (18 cm) thick, and weighs over 75 pounds (34 kg) – so impressive, as biblical scholar Fenton J. A. Hort says, as to fill the beholder with a feeling akin to awe.

The Book of Psalms is provided in Jerome's third version, translated from the Hebrew, rather than in the pre-Jerome Roman Psalter then standard in English bibles, or in Jerome's second, Gallican version, that was to supplant his Hebraic Psalms in most Vulgate bibles from the 9th century onwards. By contrast with most of the Old Testament, the Amiatinus psalms text is commonly considered an inferior witness to Jerome's Versio iuxta Hebraicum (Translation according to the Hebrew); the presence of the 'Columba' series of psalm headings, also found in the Cathach of St. Columba, demonstrates that an Irish psalter must have been its source; but the text differs in many places from the best Irish manuscripts. The New Testament is preceded by the Letter of Jerome to Pope Damasus, and the Prolegomena to the four Gospels.

The Codex Amiatinus qualifies as an illuminated manuscript as it has some decoration including two full-page miniatures, but these show little sign of the usual insular style of Northumbrian art and are clearly copied from late antique originals. It contains 1,040 leaves of strong, smooth vellum, fresh-looking today despite their great antiquity, arranged in quires of four sheets, or quaternions. As noted by scholar Christopher de Hamel, "[t]he 1030 leaves of the Codex Amiatinus would have utilized the skins of 515 cattle" - although, as more than a third of the quaternions include two single sheets in place of one bifolio, this can only be an approximation.

The script is written in uncial characters, large, clear, and regular, two columns to a page, and 43 or 44 lines to a column. A little space is generally left between words, although the writing often appears almost continuous. The text is divided into sections, which in the Gospels correspond closely to the Ammonian Sections. There are no marks of punctuation, but the skilled reader was guided into the sense by stichometric, or verse-like, arrangement into cola and commata, which correspond roughly to the principal and dependent clauses of a sentence. From this manner of writing the script is believed to have been modeled upon the (vetus latina) Codex Grandior of Cassiodorus, which Jarrow monastery possessed and may have been a model for illustrations and arrangement as well, but it may go back, perhaps, even to St. Jerome.

== History ==
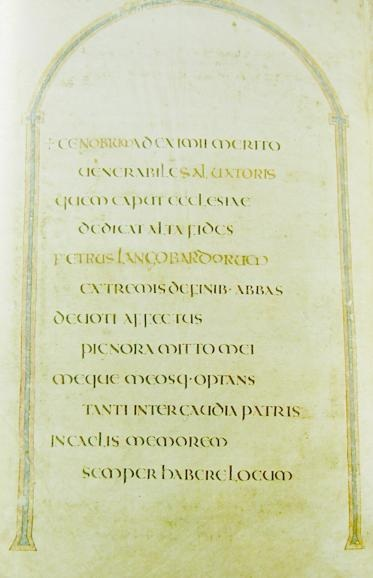
Page with dedication; "Ceolfrith of the English" was altered into "Peter of the Lombards"

Three copies of the Bible were originally commissioned by Abbot Ceolfrith in 692. This date has been established as the double monastery of Monkwearmouth–Jarrow secured a grant of additional land to raise the 2000 head of cattle needed to produce the vellum. Bede was most likely involved in the compilation. De Hamel suggests that the pandects were prepared, possibly partly inscribed, and potentially corrected in a few places by Bede himself. Bede's handwriting may be present. In 716, Ceolfrith accompanied one copy, the Codex Amiatinus, intended as a gift to Pope Gregory II, but he died en route to Rome on 29 September 716 at Langres, Burgundy. The book later appears in the ninth century in Abbazia di San Salvatore, Monte Amiata, in the March of Tuscany (hence the description "Amiatinus"), where it is recorded in a list of the Abbey's relics dated 1036, describing it as being an Old and New Testament "written in the hand of the blessed Pope Gregory". It remained in the San Salvatore Monastery until 1786 when it passed to the Laurentian Library in Florence.

The dedication page had been altered and the principal librarian to the Laurentian, Angelo Maria Bandini suggested that the author was Servandus, a follower of St. Benedict, and that it had been produced at Monte Cassino around the 540s. This claim was accepted for the next hundred years, establishing it as the oldest copy of the Vulgate, but scholars in Germany noted the similarity to 9th-century texts. In 1888, Giovanni Battista de Rossi established that the Codex was related to the Bibles mentioned by Bede. This also established that Amiatinus was related to the Greenleaf Bible fragment in the British Library. Although de Rossi's attribution removed 150 years from the age of the Codex, it remains the oldest complete text of the Vulgate.

As the primary source of the Vulgate, the manuscript was of particular importance to the Catholics during the Counter-Reformation. Protestant translations derived from the original language of the Scriptures, but the Latin text of the Amiatinus was earlier than any then-known Hebrew manuscript, making it a "major piece of propaganda in the battle for textual precedence". In 1587 Pope Sixtus V demanded the book be sent to Rome where it was consulted for a new papal edition of the Bible, the Sixtine Vulgate; although in the event, little or no use was made of its readings in either the Sistine or subsequent Sixto-Clementine official Vulgate editions, whose editors rather preferred later medieval Vulgate texts and editions now known to have been heavily corrupted by non-Vulgate readings.

In view of the many accumulated corruptions in all published editions of the Vulgate so far, the Oxford University Press accepted in 1878 a proposal from classicist John Wordsworth (later Bishop of Salisbury) to produce a new critical edition of the Vulgate New Testament. This was eventually published as Nouum Testamentum Domini nostri Iesu Christi Latine, secundum editionem sancti Hieronymi (The Latin New Testament of our Lord Jesus Christ, according to the version of Saint Jerome) in three volumes between 1889 and 1954; the Codex Amiatinus being a primary source for the entire text; which also followed this manuscript in presenting the text in sense lines, cola et commata without any other indication of punctuation. In 1907 Pope Pius X commissioned the Benedictine monks in Rome to prepare a critical edition of Jerome's Vulgate, entitled Biblia Sacra iuxta latinam vulgatam versionem (The Holy Bible according to the Latin Vulgate Version), which eventually emerged as a counterpart Old Testament to the Oxford New Testament, following largely the same critical principles, and according similar primary status to the Codex Amiatinus text (other than for the Psalms); and similarly deriving its layout, cola et commata from Amiatinus. It is now kept at the Laurentian Library (shelf number Amiatino 1).

== Textual characteristics ==
Codex Amiatinus Novum Testamentum Latine (Codex Amiatinus: Latin New Testament), prepared by Tischendorf, does not contain the Johannine Comma (1 John 5.7).

== See also ==
- List of New Testament Latin manuscripts
- Celt (tool) – a famous mistake in most Vulgates, not found in this copy
- Ceolfrid Bible – almost certainly a surviving portion of one of the other two single-volume Bibles ordered made by Ceolfrid for the double monastery of Monkwearmouth–Jarrow
- Codex Fuldensis
