= Gulf of Saint Euphemia =

Inlet of the Tyrrhenian Sea in Italy

- Golfo di Sant'Eufemia (Italian)
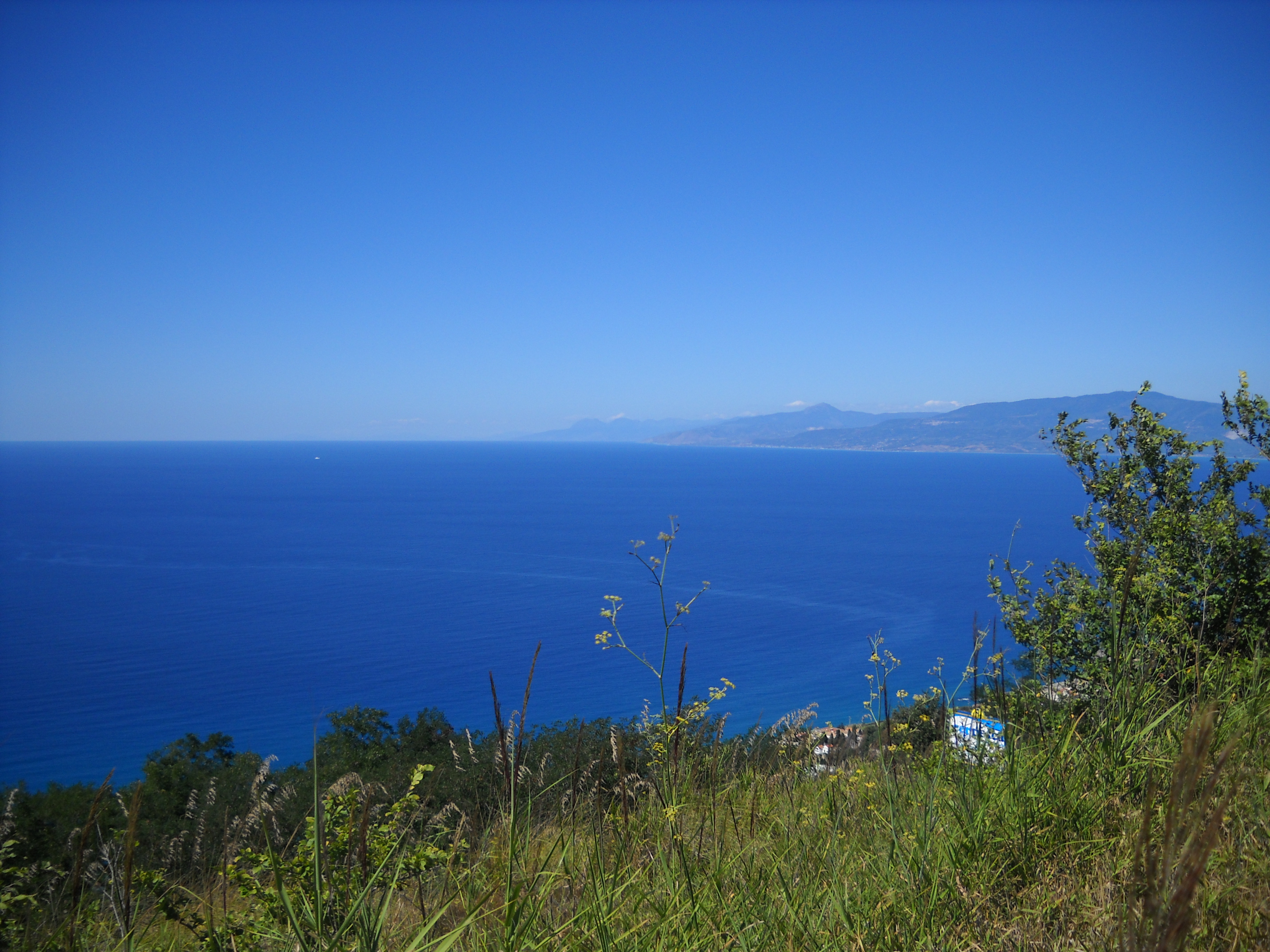

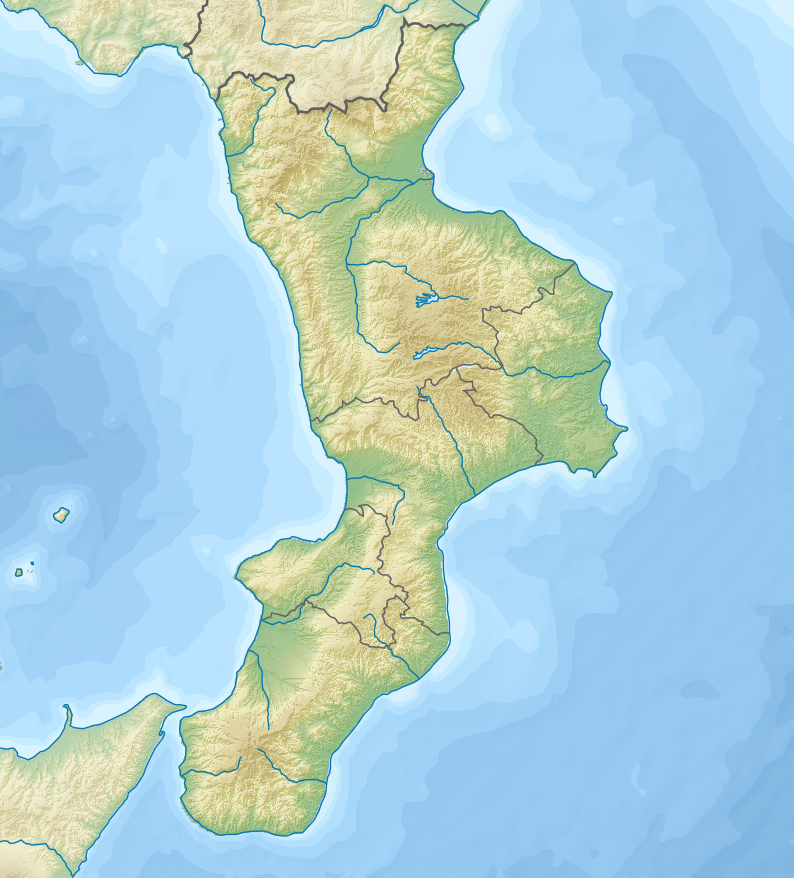
- Location within Calabria
- Location: Calabria
- Coordinates: 38°50′24″N 16°03′00″E
- Etymology: Euphemia
- Part of: Tyrrhenian Sea
- Average depth: 200 metres (660 ft)

The Gulf of Saint Euphemia (Italian: Golfo di Sant'Eufemia; Latin: Vibonensis Sinus; Ancient Greek: Λαμητικὸς κόλπος, romanized: Lamētikòs kólpos) is a gulf on the west coast of Calabria, southern Italy. It is part of the Tyrrhenian Sea and borders the province of Cosenza, the province of Catanzaro, and the province of Vibo Valentia.

== Geography ==
The gulf extends from Campora San Giovanni in the north to Capo Vaticano in the south. The rivers Savuto, Amato, and Angitola flow into the gulf. Some of the important towns and cities near the gulf include Lamezia Terme, Vibo Valentia, and Tropea. The land bordering the gulf is mountainous in the north and south with a plain in the middle. A relatively narrow isthmus lies between the Gulf of Saint Euphemia and the Gulf of Squillace.
