= Jean de Montfort-Castres =

Jean de Montfort (died December 1300) was count of Squillace, seigneur of la Ferté-Alais, of Bréthencourt, and of Castres-en-Albigeois from 1270 to 1300. He was the son of Philippe II de Montfort, count of Squillace, Lord of La Ferté Alais, of Bréthencourt and of Castres, and of Jeanne de Lévis-Mirepoix.

He succeeded his father on his death in 1270 in Tunis in the course of the Eighth Crusade. He went to the kingdom of Naples where he was named captain-general of Calabria, in 1299. He died the following year, having had no issue despite marrying three times:

1. Isabella Maletta, daughter of Manfred Maletta,
2. Giovanna di Fasanella, dame de Genzano, daughter of Pandolfo di Fasanella,
3. Marguerite de Beaumont-en-Gâtinais, daughter of Pierre de Beaumont, count of Montescaglioso et d'Alba, and of Filippa de Ceccano. On Jean's death she remarried to Robert II of Dreux, seigneur of Beu.

== Ancestry ==
Ancestors of Jean de Montfort-Castres

Simon III de Montfort
Guy de Montfort, Lord of Sidon
Amicia de Beaumont
Philip of Montfort, Lord of Tyre
Balian of Ibelin
Helvis of Ibelin
Maria Komnene
Philip of Montfort, Lord of Castres
Eleonore de Courtenay
Jean de Montfort
Guy I de Lévis, Lord of Mirepoix
Jeanne de Lévis-Mirepoix
Guibourge of Montfort

== Sources ==
- "Philippe de MONTFORT seigneur de Tyr". Sur les traces de vos ancêtres... (in French).

Preceded by Philippe II	Lord of Castres; 1270–1300	Succeeded by Jean V
