= Gulf of Squillace =

Inlet of the Ionian Sea along the Calabrian coast of Italy

Coordinates: 38.7500°N 16.8400°E

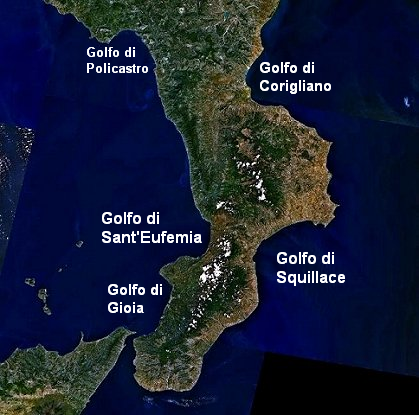
Gulf of Calabria

The Gulf of Squillace (Italian: Golfo di Squillace; Latin: Scylleticus Sinus or Scyllaceus Sinus; Ancient Greek: Σκυλλητικὸς κόλπος, romanized: Skyllētikòs kólpos) is a body of water, an inlet of the Ionian Sea along the Calabrian coast of Italy.

The gulf is part of the Ionian Sea and makes up part of the east coast of the region of Calabria. It takes its present-day name from the coastal town of Squillace.

== Ancient history ==
Anciently known as Scylleticus Sinus, from the ancient coastal city of Scylletium, which Strabo mentions is situated on the east coast of Bruttium (modern Calabria), situated on the shores of an extensive bay, to which it gave the name of Scylleticus Sinus. It is this bay, still known as the Gulf of Squillace, which indents the coast of Calabria on the east as deeply as that of Hipponium or Terina (the Gulf of Saint Euphemia) does on the west, so that they leave but a comparatively narrow isthmus between them.

The Scylleticus Sinus, or Gulf of Squillace, was always regarded as dangerous to mariners; hence Virgil calls it navifragum Scylaceum. There is no natural port throughout its whole extent, and into the 19th century, it still bore an evil reputation for shipwrecks. The name is found in Aristotle as well as Antiochus of Syracuse, but would seem to have been unknown to Thucydides; at least it is difficult to explain otherwise the peculiar manner in which he speaks of the Terinaean gulf, while relating the voyage of Gylippus along the east coast of Bruttium.
