= Comma (rhetoric) =

In Ancient Greek rhetoric, a comma (κόμμα komma, plural κόμματα kommata) is a short clause, something less than a colon. The plural of comma in English is commata.

In the system of Aristophanes of Byzantium, commata were separated by middle interpuncts.

In antiquity, a comma was defined as a combination of words that has no more than eight syllables.

There is a short text which arguably could have been inserted in the first epistle of John called the Johannine Comma.

== Bibliography ==
- Bruce M. Metzger, Bart D. Ehrman, The Text of the New Testament. Its Transmission, Corruption, and Restoration, New York, Oxford: Oxford University Press, 2005, pp. 45–46.
- Toivo Viljamaa, "Colon and comma: Dionysius of Halicarnassus on the sentence structure", pp. 163–178 in P. Swiggers, A. Wouters (eds.), Syntax in Antiquity, 2003
