= Philip of Montfort, Lord of Castres =

Philip ΙΙ of Montfort (died 24 September 1270) was a French nobleman, Count of Squillace in Italy from 1266/68, then Lord of Castres in 1270. He was the son of Philip I of Monfort, Lord of Tyre and Eleonore of Courtenay. His coat-of-arms was Gules, a lion rampant double queued argent, a label of four points azure (or ... rampant queue forche ...).

== Biography ==
Coats of Arms of the Lords of Castres.

He joined the expedition of Charles of Anjou to conquer the Kingdom of Sicily, and he shared command of the first battalion at the Battle of Benevento with Hugh of Mirepoix. After Benevento, he was given command of forces to protect the Papal States. He led the Angevin troops into the island of Sicily, and put down the revolt that resulted in the sacking of Augusta.

On his father’s death in March 1270, he succeeded to his French seigneury of Castres, but his father's possessions in Outremer had been granted to his half-brother John of Montfort. He joined the Eighth Crusade and died in Tunis.

== Family ==
He married Jeanne de Lévis-Mirepoix (died 30 June 1284), daughter of Guy I de Lévis, Lord of Mirepoix and Guibourge of Montfort and had three children:

- John of Montfort, Count of Squillace (died before December 1300)
- Laure of Montfort (died before December 1300)
- Eleonore of Montfort (died after May 1338)
- Jeanne of Montfort (died 1300)

== See also ==
- Charles I of Sicily
- Eighth Crusade
- Philip of Montfort, Lord of Tyre

== Sources ==
- de Boos, Emmanuel (2004). L'armorial le Breton: Centre historique des Archives nationales (France). Somogy editions d'art.
- Powicke, Frederick Maurice (1967). Ways of Medieval Life and Thought: Essays and Addresses. Biblo and Tannen.
- Runciman, Steven (1958). The Sicilian Vespers. Cambridge University Press. ISBN 0-521-43774-1.
