= Scylletium =

Ancient city in Calabria, Italy

- Σκυλλήτιον (Ancient Greek); Scolacium
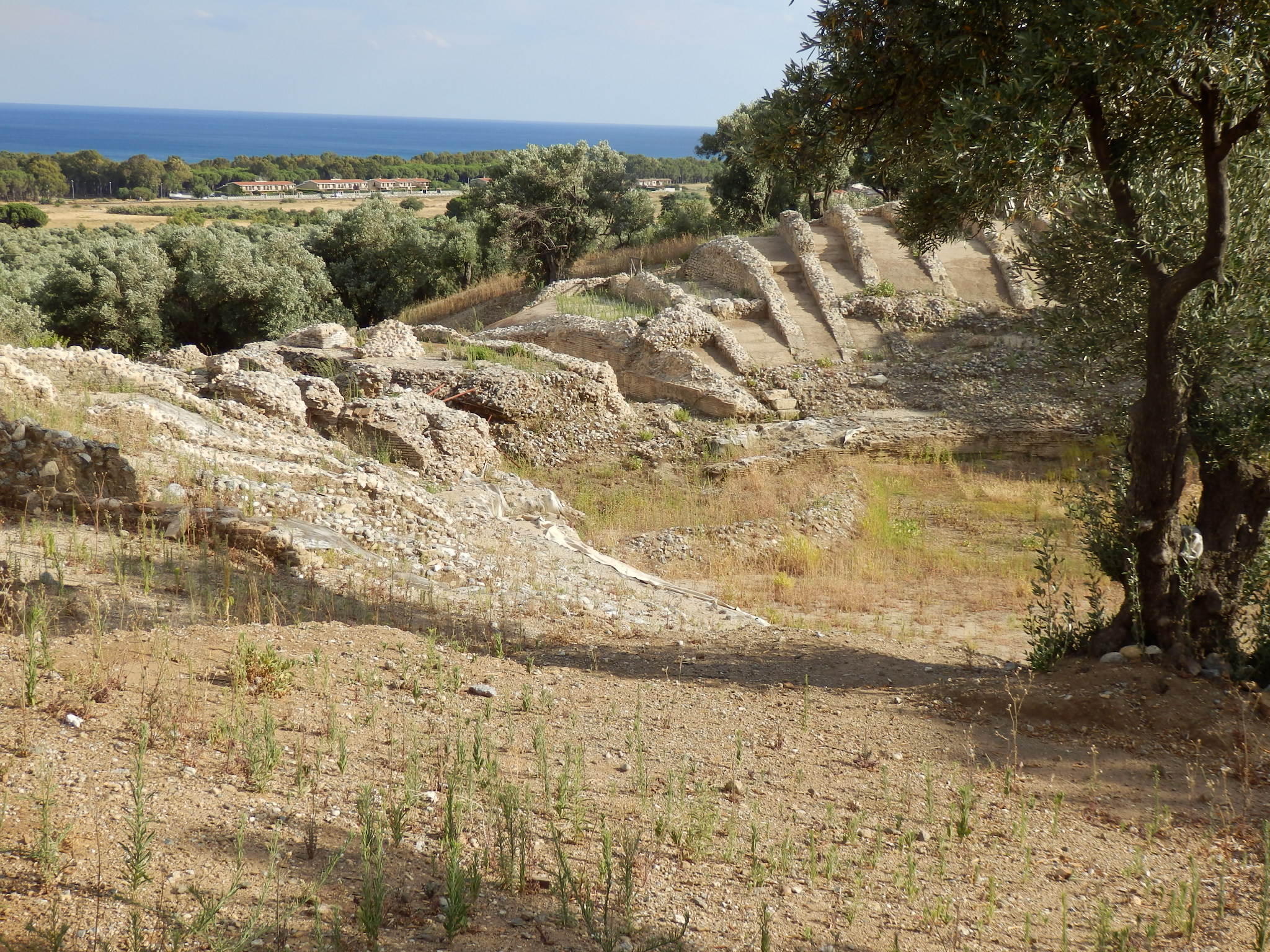
- Remains of Amphithéâtres of Scolacium.

- Location within Italy
- 38°48′33″N 16°35′44″E
- Type: Settlement
- Location: Borgia, Catanzaro, Calabria, Italy

Site notes
- Excavation dates: 1982
- Management: Soprintendenza per i Beni Archeologici della Calabria
- Website: ArcheoCalabriaVirtual (in Italian)

Scylletium, (Note: Also spelled Scolacium, Scylacium, Scolatium, Scyllaceum, Scalacium, or Scylaeium in Latin; Greek: Σκυλλήτιον, romanized: Skyllḗtion (per Stephanus of Byzantium and Strabo), or Σκυλάκιον, Skylákion (per Ptolemy).) later Minervium and Colonia Minervia, was an ancient seaside city in present-day Calabria, southern Italy. Its ruins can be found at the frazione (borough) of Roccelletta in Borgia, near Catanzaro, facing the Gulf of Squillace.

== History ==
=== Greek era ===
Skylletion may originally have been founded in the 7th c. BC on the Punta di Staletti promontory.

In any case Scylletium was situated from the 6th c. BC on the east coast of Calabria (ancient Bruttium), on the shores of an extensive bay, to which it gave the name of Scylleticus Sinus.

According to a tradition generally received in ancient times, Scylletium (Σκυλλήτιον) was founded by an Athenian colony of Magna Graecia, a part of the followers who had accompanied Menestheus to the Trojan War. Solinus also mention that the Scylaceum was established by Athenians. Another tradition was, however, extant, which ascribed its foundation to Ulysses. However, it did not display any friendship towards the Athenians.

It appears during this period to have been a minor place and a mere dependency of Crotona until it was wrested from its power by the elder Dionysius, who assigned it with its territory to the Locrians.

It was still a small and unimportant place at the time of the Second Punic War, as no mention is found of its name during the operations of Hannibal in Bruttium, though he appears to have had his headquarters for some time at Castra Hannibalis very near Scylletium.

=== Roman era ===
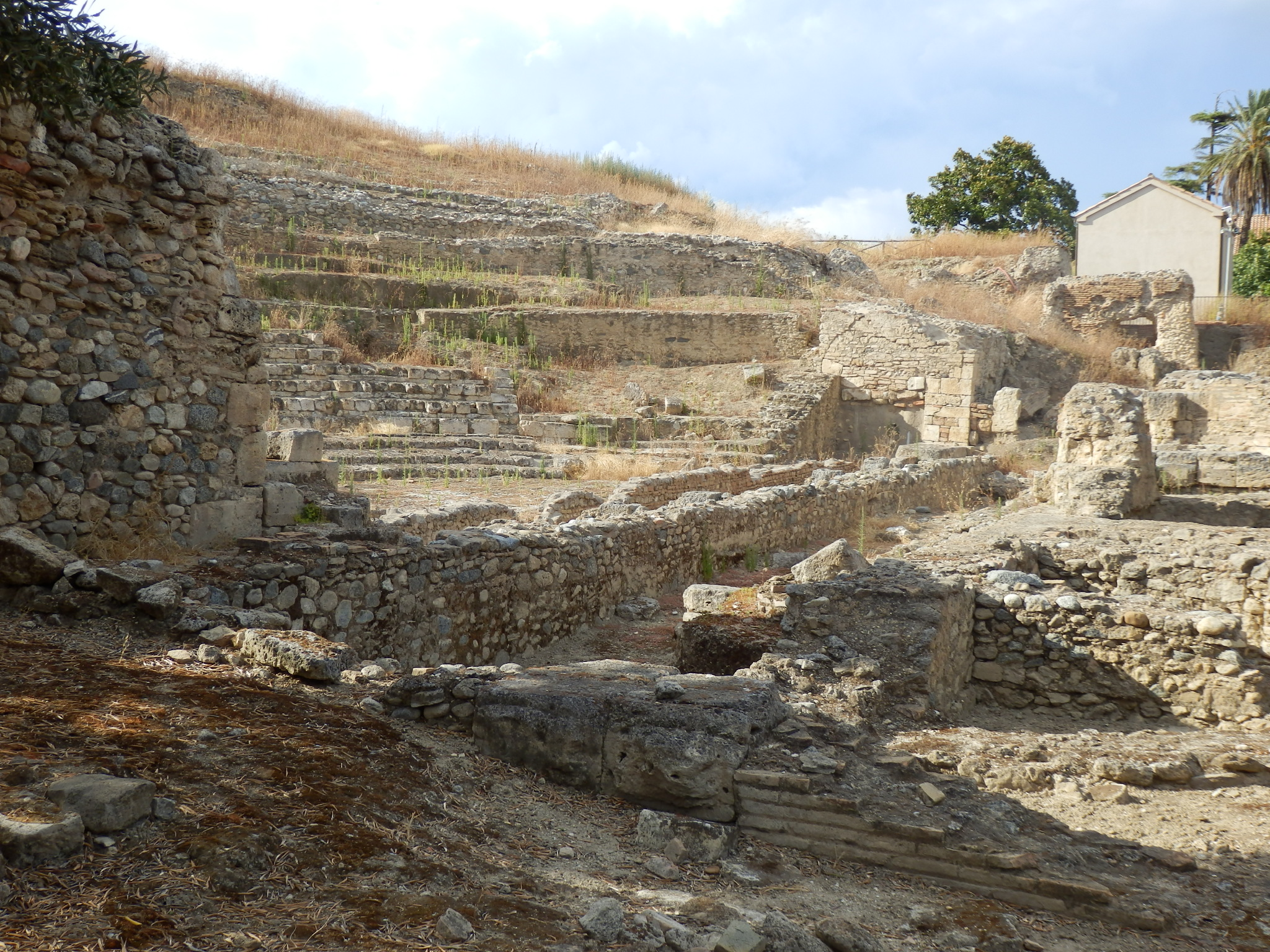
Scolacium Theatre

In 124 BC the Romans, at the instigation of C. Gracchus, sent a colony to Scylletium, which appears to have assumed the name of Minervium or Colonia Minervia. The name is written by Velleius Scolatium; and the form Scolacium is found also in an inscription of the reign of Antoninus Pius, from which it appears that the place must have received a fresh colony under Nerva. Scylletium appears to have become a considerable town after it received the Roman colony, and continued such throughout the Roman Empire.

Towards the close of this period it was distinguished as the birthplace of the Roman statesman Cassiodorus, founder of the Vivarium, a monastery dedicated to the coexistence of coenobitic monks and hermits, who has left us a detailed but rhetorical description of the beauty of its situation dated to around 530 AD, and fertility of its territory. Cassiodorus also mentioned production of highly priced terra cotta. His villa was located at Punta di Staletti.

== Sculpture ==
In 2006 a sculpture with the title Time Horizon was set up in the park by the English sculptor Antony Gormley.

== Literature ==
- Antony Gormley: Time Horizon Intersecione, Intersecione 2 al Parco Archeologico di Scolacium, 2006 ISBN 88-370-4583-2

== Sources ==
- Roberto Spadea (a cura di), Scolacium una città romana in Calabria. Il museo e il parco archeologico, Milano, ET, 2005, pp. 506-542 e pp. 51-65
- Talbert, Richard, ed. (2000). "Map 46". Barrington Atlas of the Greek and Roman World. Princeton University Press. ISBN 978-0-691-03169-9.
