= Poggio Reale (villa) =

15th-century Renaissance villa in Naples, Italy

Coordinates: 40.870042°N 14.292380°E

Location of Villa Poggio Reale, Naples, Italy

The Poggio Reale villa or Villa Poggio Reale was an Italian Renaissance villa commissioned in 1487 by Alfonso II of Naples as a royal summer residence. The Italian phrase "poggio reale" translates to "royal hill" in English. The villa was designed and built by Giuliano da Maiano and located in the city of Naples, in the district now known as Poggioreale, between the present Via del Campo, Via Santa Maria del Pianto and the new and old Via Poggioreale. At the time it was built, a period when the capital city of the Kingdom of Naples was renowned for elegant homes with expansive vistas of the surrounding landscape and Mount Vesuvius, the villa was outside the city walls of Naples and was one of the most important architectural achievements of the Neapolitan Renaissance. Imitated, admired, robbed of its treasures by another king, left in ruins and partially destroyed, the summer palace of the King of Naples lives on in name as a style.

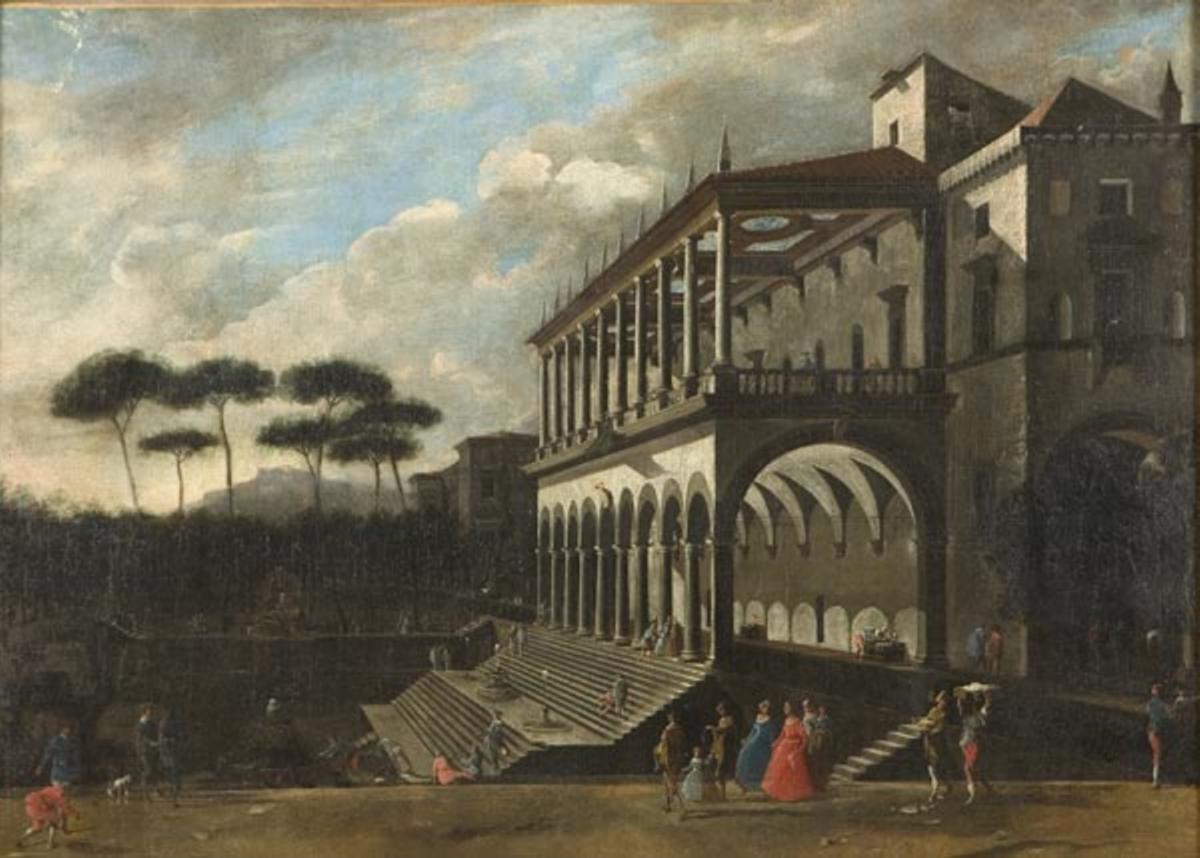
An idealized painting of the Villa Poggio Reale, Viviano Codazzi, c. 1600s.

== History ==
At the villa's building site there was a bubbling aqueduct (or Volla) that carried the waters of the Sarno with connected underground pipelines, and which was connected to the Piscina Mirabilis reservoir then called Dogliuolo, from the Latin Doliolum or Dolium (bath). The valley area of Dogliuolo was then a swampy expanse of wetlands, despite several attempts at reclamation by Neapolitan sovereigns of the Anjou and Aragon families. In 1485, King Ferdinand I of Naples decreed the reclamation of the area when he realized that drainage issues were the source and cause of malaria in the capital, and so issued his Fosso Fosso del Graviolo to eradicate the problem. During the same period and in the same area, numerous villas were built for the Neapolitan Renaissance nobility. Around 1487, the Duke of Calabria, crown prince and future king Alfonso II, bought farmland in the Poggioreale valley Dogliolo, having decided to build a royal summer residence outside the city walls, perhaps in imitation of what his ally Lorenzo de' Medici was making at the time at Villa di Castello, as Alfonso hired away Lorenzo's architect. Lorenzo's favorite architect, Giuliano da Sangallo, also visited Naples during the villa's construction, and Alfonso eventually sent him back to Florence with gifts of money, plate, and antique sculpture for Lorenzo.

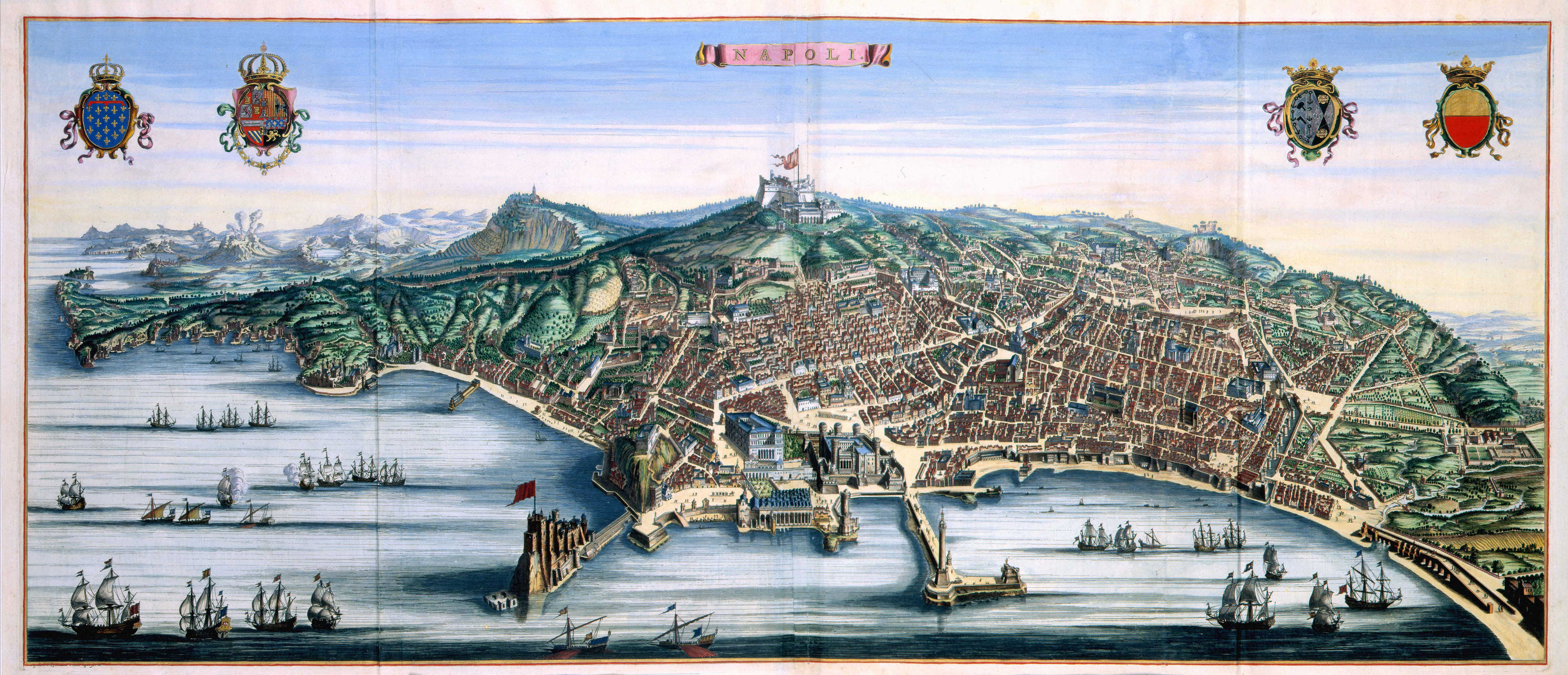
Naples c. 1663; the villa can be seen on the right.

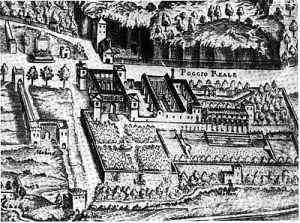
Villa Poggio Reale, c. 1670.

=== Construction ===
For the construction of the building and its annexes, Alfonso used his authority to expropriate land from others, often without compensation, for example, during construction he removed the standing water flowing to some mills that belonged to Gian Battista Brancaccio. For the residence's design, he hired the Florentine architect Giuliano da Maiano, who arrived in Naples in 1487 with a model for the villa which he had developed while still in Florence. Giuliano da Maiano began the work that year and continued to direct construction until his death in 1490, when the building was substantially completed and partially occupied. Construction then continued, possibly by Francesco di Giorgio Martini and students of Maiano, and ultimately the Villa Poggio Reale became the seat of the Neapolitan court. The design of the villa was a considerable success and was mentioned in Book III of Sebastiano Serlio's architectural treatise of sixteenth century Italian architecture.

=== Abandonment ===
During the Italian wars, in 1494 Charles VIII invaded Italy, King Alfonso fled to Sicily with some of the villa's most valuable furnishings, and soon after, the building was abandoned. Charles helped himself to the villa's remaining treasures while Alfonso was in hiding to avoid him, and while there Charles became so enthralled by the villa's charms that he induced the villa's garden designers Fra 'Giocondo and Pacello da Mercogliano to follow him to France to design the gardens of his own royal residences. Later on, King Ferdinand II of Naples ceded parts of the villa to others during a time when he was in financial difficulty, including the gardens, which by that time were used for cultivation.

=== Battle site ===
Beginning to crumble by the time of the sack of Rome in 1527, at the end of the High Renaissance the villa found itself at the center of Odet de Foix's battle for the conquest of Naples. With the villa's aqueduct ruined in the battle, a malaria epidemic broke out that destroyed his army, and the French were forced to withdraw. In the aftermath, nature took its course: the area around the Villa Poggio Reale returned to its natural swamp-like state, and years passed before the reclamation of the surrounding land began again.

The ruined villa was also used as a meeting place in 1535 by Naples' sovereign at the time, Charles V. Because of repeated earthquakes, by 1582 it was necessary to strengthen the villa's remaining structure to avoid it collapsing altogether.

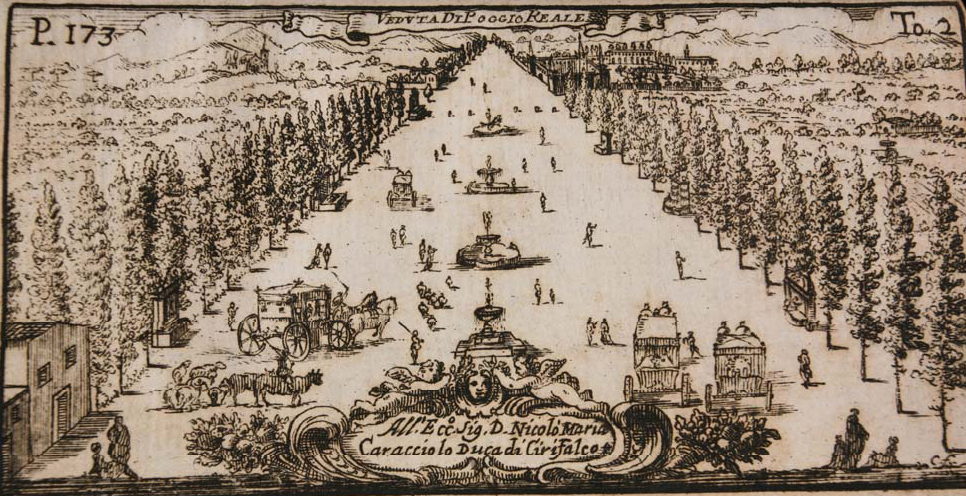
Villa Poggio Reale, 1718 drawing published by Domenico Antonio Parrino

=== Revival ===
By 1604, King Philip III of Spain was the ruler of Naples, and a revival of Villa Poggio Reale was started by his viceroy Juan Alonso Pimentel de Herrera, who also decided to beautify the approach to the royal villa with an avenue of trees and fountains. (Parrino published a drawing of the planned avenue in 1718.) However, with the resurgence of bubonic plague in 1656, the villa and its gardens again fell into disrepair. The remains of the villa became, from that time, a burial place for lepers, and thus King Alfonso II's villa was abandoned to death, and given, as evidenced by eighteenth century documents, to the Miroballo family; in 1789, one of the family members spoke explicitly of the palace as collapsed and its gardens reduced to cropland.

=== Final destruction ===
In 1762, an official cemetery was built a short distance from the villa's site by Ferdinando Fuga, the Cemetery of the 366 Fosse. At the beginning of the nineteenth century, another burial place, this time the Cemetery of Poggioreale, was built atop the ruins of the villa, obliterating the villa entirely and making the determination of the exact location of the former villa's premises very difficult.

Further difficulties for historians and archaeologists are presented by the fact that Naples suffered heavy Allied bombing raids during World War II, particularly from 1940–43. During the war, the main Allied effort on Italy's west coast initially centered on the port of Naples, selected because it was the northernmost port that could receive Allied air support by fighter aircraft operating from Sicily. It is unknown whether documentation of the villa was destroyed when the German army set fire to the Biblioteca Nazionale Vittorio Emanuele III, third largest of Italy's National Libraries, during the Four days of Naples.

== Description ==
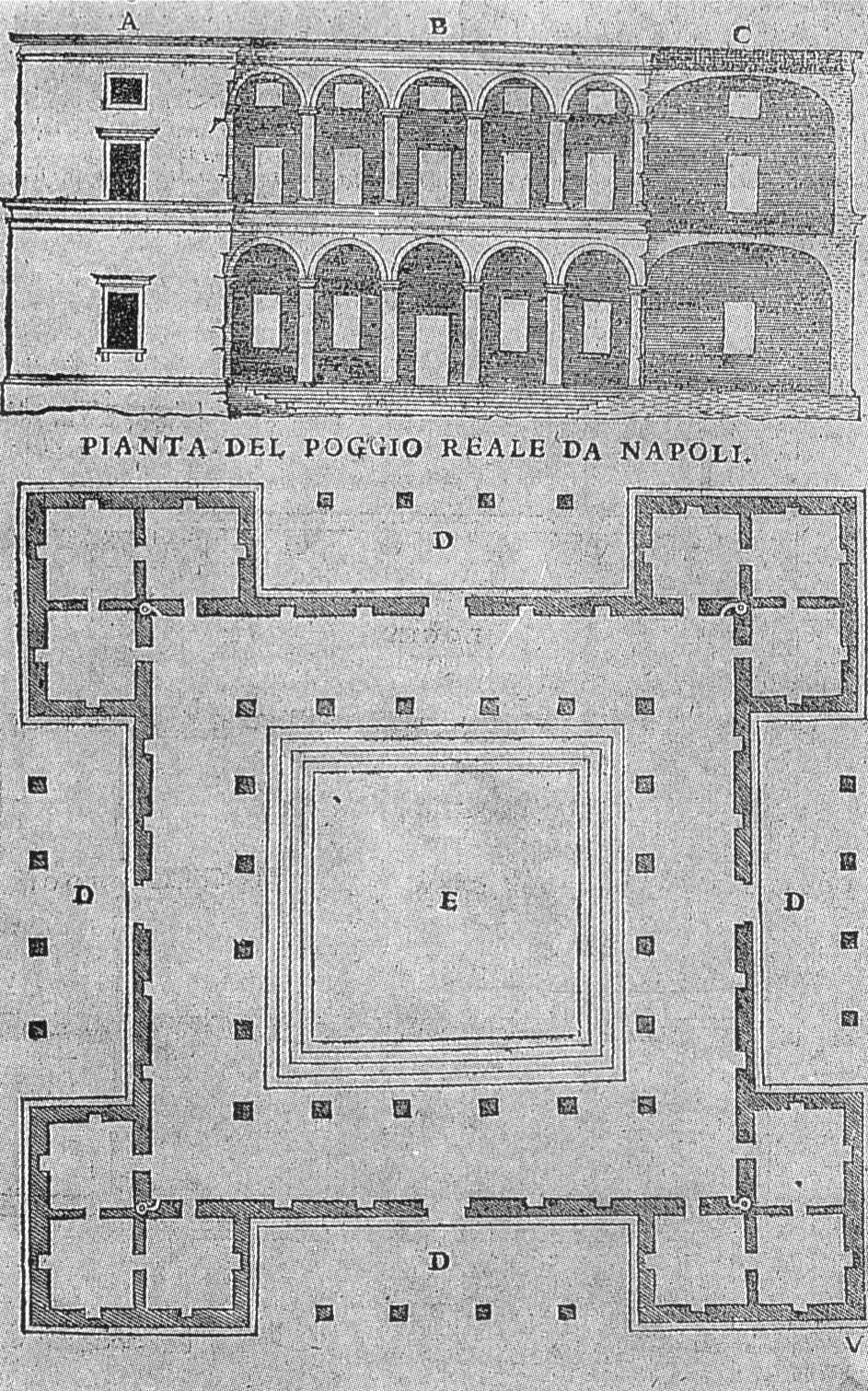
Sebastiano Serlio, Treatise of Architecture, Book III, Venice 1540.

During the 15–16th century, the Crown of Aragon's de facto capital was Naples, and Villa Poggio Reale's design was the culmination of the gradual conversion from purely Italian medieval domestic architecture to the Moorish-influenced forms of the Aragonese Renaissance architectural style from Valencia, a process of evolution that took place in that late fifteenth century capital as well as everywhere the nobility of Aragon settled. One can still get an idea of the villa in Sebastiano Serlio's 1584 treatise showing the villa's critical fortune that made it an exemplar of sixteenth century architecture. Giorgio Vasari later reported, "At Poggio Reale [Giuliano da Maiano] laid out the architecture of that palazzo, always considered a most beautiful thing; and to fresco it he brought there Pietro del Donzello, a Florentine, and Polito his brother who was considered in that time a good master, who painted the whole palazzo, inside and out, with the history of the said king."

The main building was characterized by an original design, with architectural references to ancient elements adapted to the contemporary needs of the day: its foundation was of the same type as ancient Roman-style villas, peristyled but buttressed with defensive elements because of the needs of a fortified palace, and had interior and exterior loggias as well as elements of play, as the residence was a recreation spot of the royal court of the day.

The result was a building of relatively small dimensions, characterized by a main body with a quadrangular base, with four projecting wings at the corners, similar to angular towers, but with height equal to the rest of the building. The building was arranged around a square courtyard paved with glazed ceramic tiles, with the courtyard sunk to a depth of five steps, similar to ancient Roman structures such as theaters and thermal baths. The courtyard, according to a model by Vitruvius, could be covered with a wooden platform to be used for parties and performances, or could be flooded for a scenic lake effect.

The drawing made by Serlio, who never saw the building, does not match perfectly the original construction since it is centered on the four colonnaded exterior elevations that were never realized. Serlio also does not address the wooden roof that would have transformed the courtyard into a large central hall. Also, the building was not a perfect square, but a rectangle as shown by the sparse but iconographic later documentation.

Inside the villa were loggias on two floors and frescos by the most important artists of the day, with the sovereign's quests emphasized among the many paintings by artists Donzello and his brother Ippolito, each chronicling episodes of Alfonso's skirmishes against the warring barons of a few years earlier.

=== Setting ===
The main building overlooked a garden square and sat in front of a large side yard with service buildings. The complex continued with a fish pond and other garden areas, all to the side of the main building. The villa and its service buildings were surrounded by a large park, also used as a hunting area, which reached to the sea.

Of particular beauty were the formal gardens decorated with exuberant fountains, their virtues extolled in the French poem Le Vergier d’Honeur, and also remarkable was the presence of many ancient sculptures which were scattered throughout the building and in the various parts of the gardens. The design of the gardens was perhaps due, at least in part, to the efforts of Giovanni Giocondo and Pacello da Mercogliano, both artists stolen from Alfonso by Charles of France for their skill and talent they could apply to his own gardens.

== See also ==
- Timeline of Naples
- Poggioreale, Naples
- Renaissance architecture
- Villas in Naples
