= Cemetery of Poggioreale =

Cemetery in Naples, Italy

Coordinates: 40.870042°N 14.292380°E

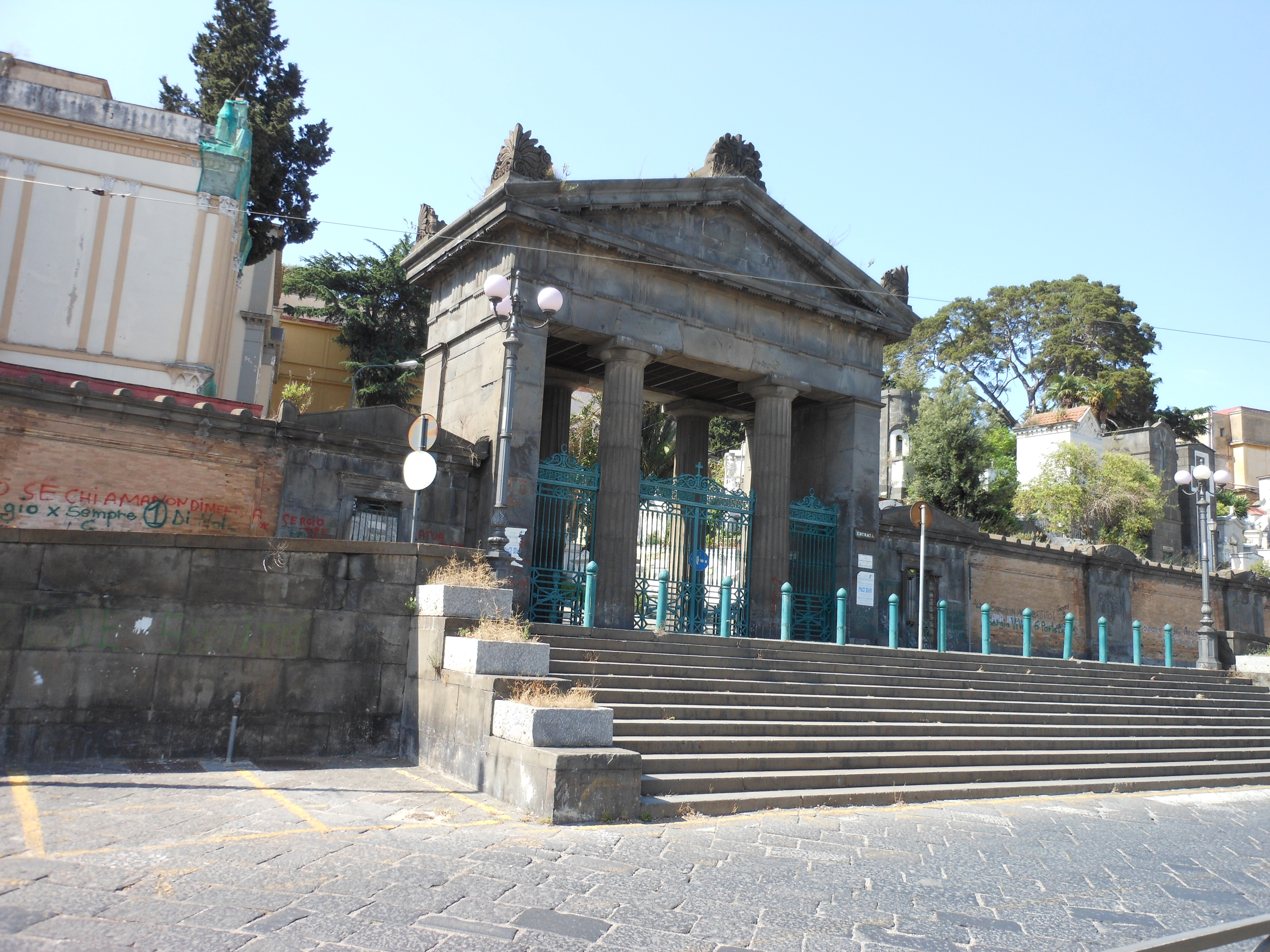
Main entrance.

The Cemetery of Poggioreale is one of the major cemeteries in Naples, Italy. It is also known as Camposanto Nuovo, to distinguish it from Camposanto Vecchio, which is now known as Cemetery of the 366 Fossae. It is bordered by the Largo Santa Maria del Pianto, Via del Riposo, Via Santa Maria del Pianto, and Via Nuova Poggioreale, and is built upon the ruins of Alphonso II's Villa Poggio Reale.

== History ==
Until the 18th century, most funeral monuments were located inside churches, closer to the divine air, and where families could either buy a generation of prayer, or at least be entombed within earshot of genuflecting masses, so as to be lifted into heaven by their overhead chants. As churches became crowded with tombs, this open-air monumental cemetery allowed noble families to build private chapels and crypts in a slightly more secular location, on the southern side of the hill of Poggioreale. The cemetery was begun during the Napoleonic occupation, and remodelled in 1836–1837.

The layout is that of a garden. At the upper end is a Neoclassic church with a Pieta by Gennaro Cali, in its tribune; and behind a large oblong square, surrounded by a portico of fluted Doric columns, out of which open 102 proprietary chapels, beneath each of which are the family vaults of the owners. The colossal, nondenominational figure of Religion in the centre of the quadrangle is by Tito Angelini. Most of the vaults are occupied by subscription to confraternities or burial clubs.

Those who cannot afford to pay for their own graves are interred without coffins in another part of the grounds, as in the "Cemetery of the 366 Fossae"; but as the fee is small, not more than half-a-dozen bodies are deposited during the three days each pit remains open. At the southwest extremity is a space set aside for notable Neapolitans: a Quadrato degli uomini illustri (Quadrangle for illustrious men). Also adjacent are the 19th-century Protestant and Jewish cemeteries of Naples.

== Notable interments ==
Among those buried here are:

- Giovanni Amendola (1882–1926), journalist, professor, and politician
- Tito Angelini (1806–1878), sculptor and leader of the Academy of Fine Arts in Naples
- Tony Astarita (1939–1998), singer
- Maria Bakunin (1873–1960), Italian chemist and geologist
- Leonardo Bianchi (1848–1927), neuropathologist, politician, and writer
- Ruggero Bonghi (1826–1895), scholar, writer, and politician
- Luca Botta (1882–1917), operatic lyric tenor
- Giovanni Bovio (1837–1903), Italian philosopher and politician
- Libero Bovio (1883–1942), lyricist and dialect poet
- Benedetto Cairoli (1825–1889), politician
- Ernesto Capocci (1798–1864), mathematician, astronomer, and politician
- Pietro Carbone (1918–1990), Italian judge
- Benedetto Croce, philosopher and politician (tomb in the immediate vicinity of the entrance)
- Mariano d'Ayala (1808–1877), Sicilian soldier and politician
- Annibale de Gasparis (1819–1892), astronomer and politician
- Salvatore Di Giacomo (1860–1934), poet, songwriter, and playwright
- Stefano Gasse (1778–1848), architect and urban planner
- Vincenzo Gemito (1852–1929), Italian sculptor and artist
- Luigi Giura (1795–1865), engineer and architect, known for Real Ferdinando Bridge
- E. A. Mario (1884–1961), musician and writer
- Saverio Mercadante (1795–1870), composer and musician
- Antonio Niccolini (1772–1850), architect, scenic designer, and engraver, completed the facade of the Teatro di San Carlo
- Ferdinando Russo (1866–1927), journalist, poet, and lyricist
- Francesco de Sanctis (1817–1883), literary critic, scholar, and politician
- Luigi Settembrini (1813–1876), writer and politician
- Sigismond Thalberg (1812–1871), Austrian composer and pianist
- Raffaele Viviani (1888–1950), author, playwright, actor, and musician
- Niccolò Antonio Zingarelli (1752–1837), composer and musician

For a more complete list, see Category:Burials at the Cemetery of Poggioreale

== Bibliography ==
- Karl, Baedeker (1890). A handbook for travellers in southern Italy. Karl Baedeker.
