= Cemetery of the 366 Fossae, Naples =

Cemetery in Naples, Italy

Coordinates: 40°52′01.2″N 14°16′39.5″E

The Cemetery of the 366 Fossae (Cimitero delle 366 Fosse) or Cimitero di Santa Maria del Popolo or Cimitero dei Tredici was built in 1762 a short distance from the then-dilapidated Villa Poggio Reale, and is located on a terrace of a hill overlooking the Poggioreale neighborhood of Naples, Italy. It is near the monumental Cemetery of Poggioreale, which was built on top of the ruined villa. The architect was the Florentine Ferdinando Fuga.

== History ==
The goal of the cemetery was to systematize the burial of the poor; those who died in Neapolitan orphanages, poorhouses such as the nearby Albergo dei Poveri (built in 1751 also by Fuga), and hospitals such as the Ospedale degli Incurabili. The rationale was intended to reconcile a mathematical logic with a pious compassion for the underclass. Confronted with the increasingly crowded city of Naples, as destitute peasants from the countryside moved into the city, the authorities had to find ways not only to house the masses alive, but also in proper Christian burial. Prior to the construction of this complex, the masses of dead were often buried in haphazard pits in rural or suburban areas of the capital. Thus some impetus for the project came from the desire to create efficiency in the disposal of corpses.

Fuga, under the regency of Ferdinand IV of Naples, designed this cemetery; it consists of a large square yard surrounded by high walls. Under the surface of the yard are 360 adjacent brick receptacles (4 meters square), seven meters deep (with a grate set two meters from the bottom), rectangular with an arched ceiling that opens at the surface to a narrow central square portal stone, 80 cm to each side, marked with a number from 1 to 360. The vaults are arrayed in such that each number corresponded to a specific day of the year, starting with January 1 as number one. Six more tombstones are inside the entrance building. The central spot is empty, and the vaults were arrayed in 19 rows and 19 columns. The numbers ascend from left to right in the first row, then right to left and so on. Thus each day corpses were deposited in the adjacent vault. One vault was reserved for the extra day of the leap year. On average, twenty five persons were deposited in a vault each day. In 1794, after an earthquake, the numerous dead were buried in the less used leap year vault. The cemetery functioned from 1762 till 1890. It is presently in a semi-decrepit state. Based on calculations, it was likely the site for the burial of well over one hundred thousand persons.

An iron winch is still on the premises, and is said to have assisted with lowering corpses. Prior to the invention of this machine in 1875, the corpses were unceremoniously dumped into the pits.

The entrance with a skull and crossbones in the tympanum has a plaque announcing in Latin that, "The just and liberal king Ferdinand IV, of the kingdom of the two Sicilies built this common cemetery divided into individual cells for his beloved populace, in order to avoid the congestion of cadavers and their odors from harming his people, and to provide proper burial."

Ultimately, a morbid fascination with catacombs (such as the Catacombs of San Gennaro and San Gaudioso) and the dead such as the skulls of Fontanelle cemetery, is not alien to the ultra-pious Catholicism of Naples. In this cemetery, that medieval religious requirement for proper burial encounters the rationalistic momentum of the Age of Enlightenment.
