= Vincenzo Reschiglian =

Italian opera singer (1874–1955)

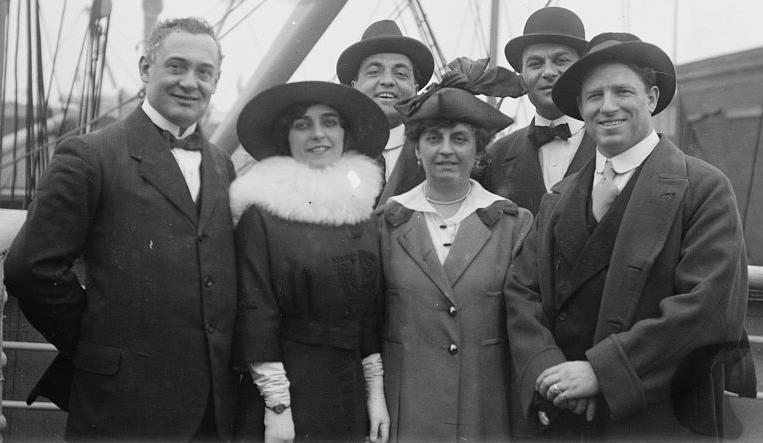
From left to right are: Vincenzo Reschiglian, Rosina Galli, Luca Botta, Galli's mother, an unknown man, and Giovanni Martinelli

Vincenzo Reschiglian (21 February 1874 – 17 July 1955) was an Italian operatic baritone who specialized in the comprimario repertoire.

== Biography ==
Reschiglian was born on 21 February 1874 in Venice, the older brother of tenor Giuseppe Reschiglian. He made his professional opera debut at the age of 26 as Tartaglia in the world premiere of Pietro Mascagni's Le maschere at the Teatro Regio di Torino on 17 January 1901. In 1905-1906 he was committed to the Paris Opera and in 1907-1908 he performed with Oscar Hammerstein I's Manhattan Opera Company in New York City.

Reschiglian was committed to the Metropolitan Opera from 1909 to 1929 where he was heard in a total of 1,577 performances. At the Met he created roles in several world premieres, including Bello in Giacomo Puccini's La fanciulla del West (1910), De Brigole in Umberto Giordano's Madame Sans-Gêne (1915), and Pinellino in Puccini's Gianni Schicchi (1919) He retired from the stage in 1929 and thereafter lived in retirement in Bergamo until his death in 1955.
