= Luca Botta =

Italian opera singer (1882–1917)

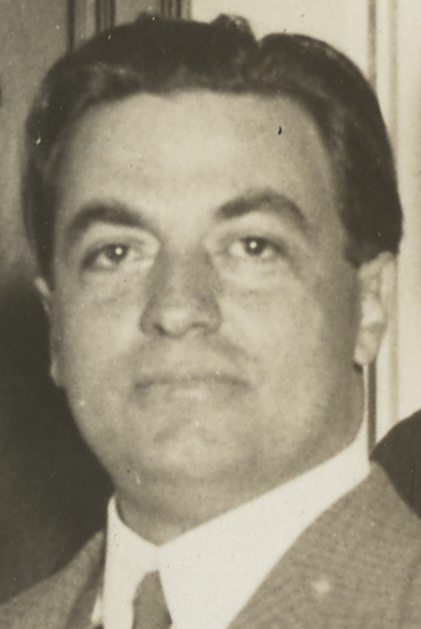
- Born: 16 April 1882; Amalfi, Province of Salerno, Italy
- Died: 29 September 1917 (aged 35); New York City, New York State, United States
- Resting place: Cemetery of Poggioreale
- Education: Naples Conservatory
- Occupation: lyric tenor opera singer
- Years active: 1909–1917
- Notable work: La traviata La bohème

Luca Botta (16 April 1882 – 29 September 1917) was an Italian operatic lyric tenor.

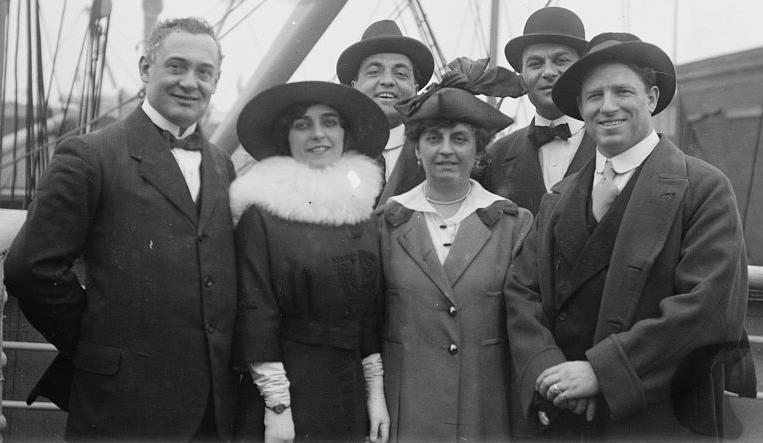
From left to right : Vincenzo Reschiglian, Rosina Galli, Luca Botta, Galli's mother, unknown man, and Giovanni Martinelli.

== Biography ==
He was born in Amalfi, Italy on 16 April 1882. He studied singing at the Naples Conservatory before making his operatic debut as Alfredo in La traviata in 1909. He made his Metropolitan Opera debut as Rodolfo in La bohème on November 21, 1914, and appeared in 91 performances with the company until his early death.

He died of cancer in New York City on 29 September 1917 at age 35. His funeral was planned to be held at the Church of the Blessed Sacrament but was moved to St. Patrick's Cathedral. He was buried in the Cemetery of Poggioreale and his pallbearers were: Pasquale Amato, Giuseppe de Luca, Leon Rothier, Antonio Scotti, Francesco Romei, Giulio Setti, Gennaro Papi, Fernando Carpi, Giulio Crimi, Francis Charles Coppicus, G. Viafora, and Dr. Henry Holbrook Curtis.
