= Pietro Carbone =

Italian judge (1918–1990)

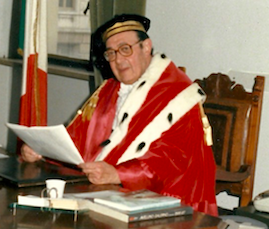
The Judge Pietro Carbone when President of the Court of the Appellate in Salerno

Pietro Carbone (15 February 1918 – 2 February 1990) was an Italian judge and Honorary Adjunct President of the Italian Supreme Court. He was born on February 15, 1918, in Martina Franca and died on February 2, 1990, in Naples, Italy.

Amongst others, he held the roles of President of Section of the Appellate court in Naples, President of the Appellate Court in Salerno - Italy (1986-1988) and President of the "Tributaria" Commission in Naples (1989-1990). He was awarded the 1st Class / Knight Grand Cross and three War Merit Crosses.

== Biography ==
Pietro Carbone was the son of Oreste Carbone, first President of the Court in Naples as well as 2nd Class / Grand Officer. In the 1940s, Carbone graduated from the Federico II University in Naples with a dual degree in law and political science. For military achievements in the Italian Air Force during World War II he was awarded three War Merit Crosses.

During his career in the Criminal Court of Naples he presided over numerous well-known trials, including the murder of the Attorney general Francesco Ferlaino in 1975, the murder of the "democristiano" Provincial Counselor Pino Amato (May 19, 1980 - terminated with the life detention of the four Red Brigades terrorists), the attempted murder of the Adjunct Attorney general Paolino Dell’Anno in 1976 and the massacre of Via Caravaggio in Naples in 1975 (defendant Domenico Zarrelli).

He was nominated President of the Section of the Appellate court in Naples to be then assigned by the Superior Council of Judiciary to the role of First President of the Appellate Court in Salerno – Italy from 1986 to 1988. In his life, he was also known as author of various law publications.

In 1989 he was awarded from the Italian President Francesco Cossiga 1st Class / Knight Grand Cross one of the highest Italian recognition for his judicial career.

As a fraternity member of the "Augustissima Arciconfraternita ed Ospedali della SS. Trinità dei Pellegrini e Convalescent" he rests in their Chapel in the Grand Clauster of the Cemetery of Poggioreale, Naples, with his father, other relatives and his wife Cecilia.

== Awards ==
Knight Grand Cross
— February 15, 1989
