= Luigi Giura =

Italian engineer and architect (1795–1865)

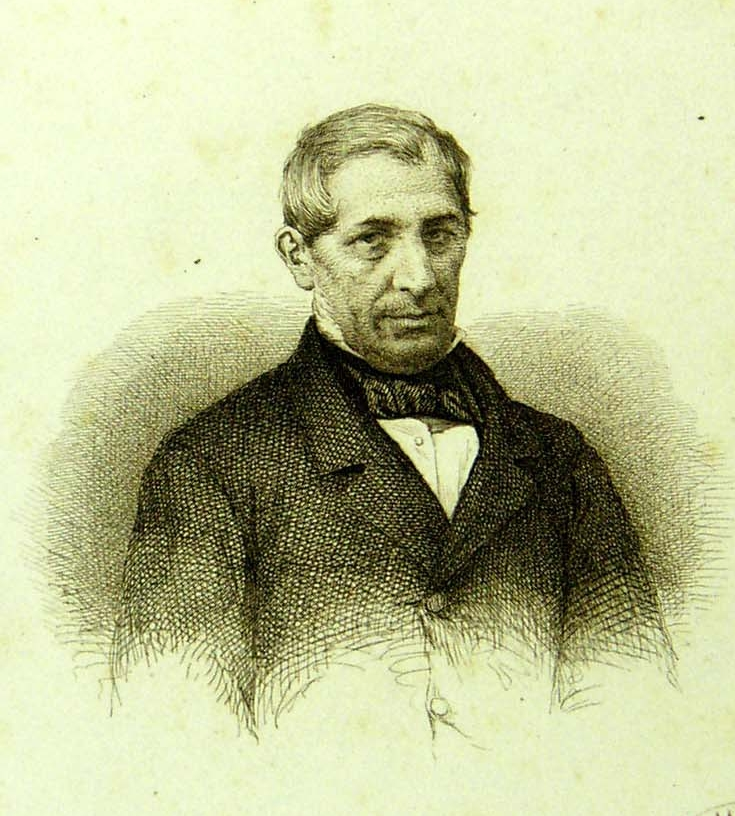
- Born: October 14, 1795; Maschito, Kingdom of Naples
- Died: 1 October 1864 (aged 68); Naples, Kingdom of Italy
- Resting place: Cemetery of Poggioreale
- Occupations: Architect; Engineer
- Known for: Real Ferdinando Bridge
- Parent(s): Francis Xavier Giura and Victoria Giura (née Pascale)

Luigi Giura (14 October 1795 – 1 October 1864) was an Italian engineer and architect of Albanian origin.

Giura was the Inspector of the Corps of Bridges and Roads of the Kingdom of the Two Sicilies. Giura is most famous for the design and construction of the second suspension bridge in Europe, the first in continental Europe, in 1832.

== Biography ==
Giura was born in 1795 in Maschito, a small Arbëreshë town in the Vulture-Melfi in Basilicata. Giura's parents were Francis Xavier Giura and Victoria Pascale. Giura received his first schooling in Maschito at the school of the Fathers of St. Joseph Calasanz and then at the seminary in Melfi; he later moved to Naples to attend university courses. Giura was a member of the initial group of students at the School of Bridges and Roads promoted by King Gioacchino Murat in his Decree of March 4, 1811. The school, during Giura's attendance, was directed by Carlo Afan de Rivera. Now the school has become the Faculty of Engineering at the University of Naples Federico II.

Giura graduated in 1814 and was admitted to the Corps of Bridges and Roads, where he began a series of study tours in Britain and France. During these tours Giura was able to check the progression being made in the field of engineering and obtain new perspectives from the industrial development of these countries. At that time the governments of the more underdeveloped countries were trying to acquire information and data to get a hold of newly developed technologies, they went about this by sending their best technicians into the field—an activity that variously hindered or encouraged the country's progress.

The Corps of Bridges and Roads (forerunner of the Neapolitan Civil Engineers), from 1820–40, established a series of interventions in the territory as Regi Lagni, channels for the flow of water in critical mountain areas, and as a result, it attracted the attention of the old French masters. In 1860, Giura returned to the School of Bridges and Roads as director. Garibaldi recognized Giura's ability and wanted him as the Minister of Public Works for the provisional government that was serving at the time.

Giura developed the arrangement of the eastern side of Naples, commonly known as "The Railway", which provided the connection between the Real Albergo dei Poveri and Piliero allowing a pass through the railway terminals at the ancient city walls. The project was partially implemented after his death in 1865. Giura's fame comes primarily from his suspension bridge designs: the Bridge Real Ferdinando sul Garigliano, which was the first suspension bridge built in continental Europe, in 1832; and the Maria Cristina Bridge on the River Calore near Benevento, completed in 1835. These accomplishments had significant effects in terms of economies and in the challenging aspect of the design. Giura also created aesthetically pleasing solutions to construction problems. The metal building components were produced in the foundries of an arms factory in Mongiana. The state funded the construction.

The Real Ferdinand Bridge was partially demolished by the retreating German divisions in 1943. The Maria Cristina Bridge, after being damaged in 1851 and promptly repaired by Giura, was completely blown into the air by German sappers in 1943.

Other achievements Giura is remembered for are:

- before the Naples train station, the terminus of the Napoli-Nocera/Castellammare railway
- supervising the construction of the Napoli-Nocera/Castellammare, now the Naples–Salerno railway
- the rebuilding of the dome (1852) of the Church of the Girolamini, Naples

After his death, Giura was buried in the Cemetery of Poggioreale.

== Bibliography ==
- Giuseppe Russo (ed.). La scuola di ingegneria in Napoli. 1811-1967. Naples 1967: Istituto Editoriale Del Mezzogiorno. pp. 159–162.
- Stefano Manno, Brunello de; Matacena, Gennaro (1979). Le Reali Ferriere ed officine di Mongiana. Naples: casa editrice storia di Napoli e delle due Sicilie.
- De Sanctis, Riccardo (1986). La nuova scienza a Napoli tra '700 e '800. Bari: Casa editrice Giuseppe Laterza & figli.
- Motta, Antonio (1993). "Luigi Giura, tecnocrate italiano nell'Ottocento borbonico". Radici. Rivista lucana di storia e cultura del Vulture. 14: 104–135.
- Di Biasio, Aldo (1994). Il passo del Garigliano nella storia d'Italia. Il ponte di Luigi Giura. Minturno: Caramanica. pp. 199–213.
- Catalano, Agostino (2003). "The suspension bridge by iron chains on the Garigliano Real Ferdinando. An example of innovative construction technique in Naples and Italy in the Bourbon Age in 1832" (PDF). Proceedings of the First International Congress on Construction History, Madrid, 20th-24th January 2003. Madrid: Instituto Juan de Herrera Escuela Técnica Superior de Arquitectura: 545–550. ISBN 84-9728-071-7.
