= Ippolito del Donzello =

Italian painter

Ippolito del Donzello (1455 – ?) was an Italian painter and architect of the Quattrocento, active mainly in Naples.

== Biography ==
Ippolito (or Polito) and his half-brother Piero were the sons of Francesco d'Antonio di Jacopo, bailiff ('donzello') of the Signoria of Florence, and were both born in that city — Piero in 1451, and Ippolito in 1455.

Ippolito was the pupil of Neri di Bicci from 1469 to 1471, and the brothers were companions in the same atelier in Florence up to 1480. In 1481, or soon after, they went to Naples to decorate the palace of Poggio Reale, which was then being built for Alfonso I, from the designs of Giuliano da Majano, and it is not unlikely that Ippolito died in that city, but the death of Ippolito is not registered. Ippolito and Pietro both assisted Antonio Solario, called II Zingaro, in the frescoes in the cloisters of the monastery of San Severino at Naples, and in the National Museum of Capodimonte are two Crucifixions and a 'Virgin and Child with Saints,' and other paintings assigned to them. They also served as architects in Naples.
