= Kingdom of the Two Sicilies =

Kingdom in southern Italy (1815–1861)

Kingdom of the Two Sicilies Regno delle Due Sicilie (Italian) Regnum Utriusque Siciliae (Latin)
- 1816–1861
- Flag (1816–1848; 1849–1860) Coat of arms
- Anthem: Inno al Re "Hymn to the King"
- The Kingdom of the Two Sicilies in 1839
- Status: Sovereign state
- Capital: Palermo (1816–1817); Naples (1817–1861)
- Official languages: Italian
- Common languages: Sicilian and Neapolitan
- Religion: Catholic
- Demonyms: Duosicilian, Sicilian, Neapolitan or Borboni
- Government: Absolute monarchy (1816–1848; 1849–1861); Constitutional monarchy (1848–1849)
- King
  - 1816–1825: Ferdinand I
  - 1825–1830: Francis I
  - 1830–1859: Ferdinand II
  - 1859–1861: Francis II
- History
  - Bourbon Restoration: 20 May 1815
  - Founded: 8 December 1816
  - Expedition of the Thousand: 1860–1861
  - Proclamation of the Kingdom of Italy: 17 March 1861

Area
- 1860: 111,900 km^{2} (43,200 sq mi)

Population
  - 1852: 9,034,719
- Currency: Two Sicilies ducat
Preceded by	Succeeded by
Kingdom of Sicily; Kingdom of Naples	Kingdom of Italy
- Today part of: Italy

The Kingdom of the Two Sicilies (Italian: Regno delle Due Sicilie) (Note: Neapolitan: Regno dê Doje Sicilie; Sicilian: Regnu dî Dui Sicili; Spanish: Reino de las Dos Sicilias) was a kingdom in Southern Italy from 1816 to 1861 under the control of the House of Bourbon-Two Sicilies, a cadet branch of the Bourbons. The kingdom was the largest sovereign state by population and land area in Italy before the Italian unification, comprising Sicily and most of the area of today's Mezzogiorno (southern Italy) and covering virtually all of the Italian peninsula south of the Papal States.

The kingdom was formed when the Kingdom of Sicily merged with the Kingdom of Naples, which was officially also known as the Kingdom of Sicily. Since both kingdoms were named after Sicily, they were collectively known as the "Two Sicilies" (Latin: Utraque Sicilia, meaning "both Sicilies"), and the unified kingdom adopted this name. The king of the Two Sicilies was overthrown by Giuseppe Garibaldi in 1860, after which the people voted in a plebiscite to join the Kingdom of Sardinia. The annexation of the Kingdom of the Two Sicilies completed the first phase of Italian unification, and the new Kingdom of Italy was proclaimed in 1861 after uniting with other Italian states.

== Name ==
The name "Two Sicilies" originated from the partition of the medieval Kingdom of Sicily. Until 1285, the island of Sicily and the Mezzogiorno were constituent parts of the Kingdom of Sicily. As a result of the War of the Sicilian Vespers (1282–1302), the King of Sicily lost the Island of Sicily (also called Trinacria) to the Crown of Aragon, but remained ruler over the peninsular part of the realm.

Although his territory became known unofficially as the Kingdom of Naples, he and his successors never renounced the title King of Sicily and still officially referred to their realm as the Kingdom of Sicily. At the same time, the Aragonese rulers of the Island of Sicily also called their realm the Kingdom of Sicily. Hence, the kingdom that resulted from their reunification was named the Kingdom of the Two Sicilies.

== Background ==
=== Origins of the two kingdoms ===
From the late 11th century onwards, Norman warriors conquered the island of Sicily, which had been ruled by the Saracens since 827. The conqueror Roger I became Count of Sicily and Calabria. His son Roger II also inherited the Duchy of Apulia. In 1131 this became the Kingdom of Sicily. Through further conquests, Roger II was able to expand his sphere of influence over all of Lower Italy as far as the Papal States.

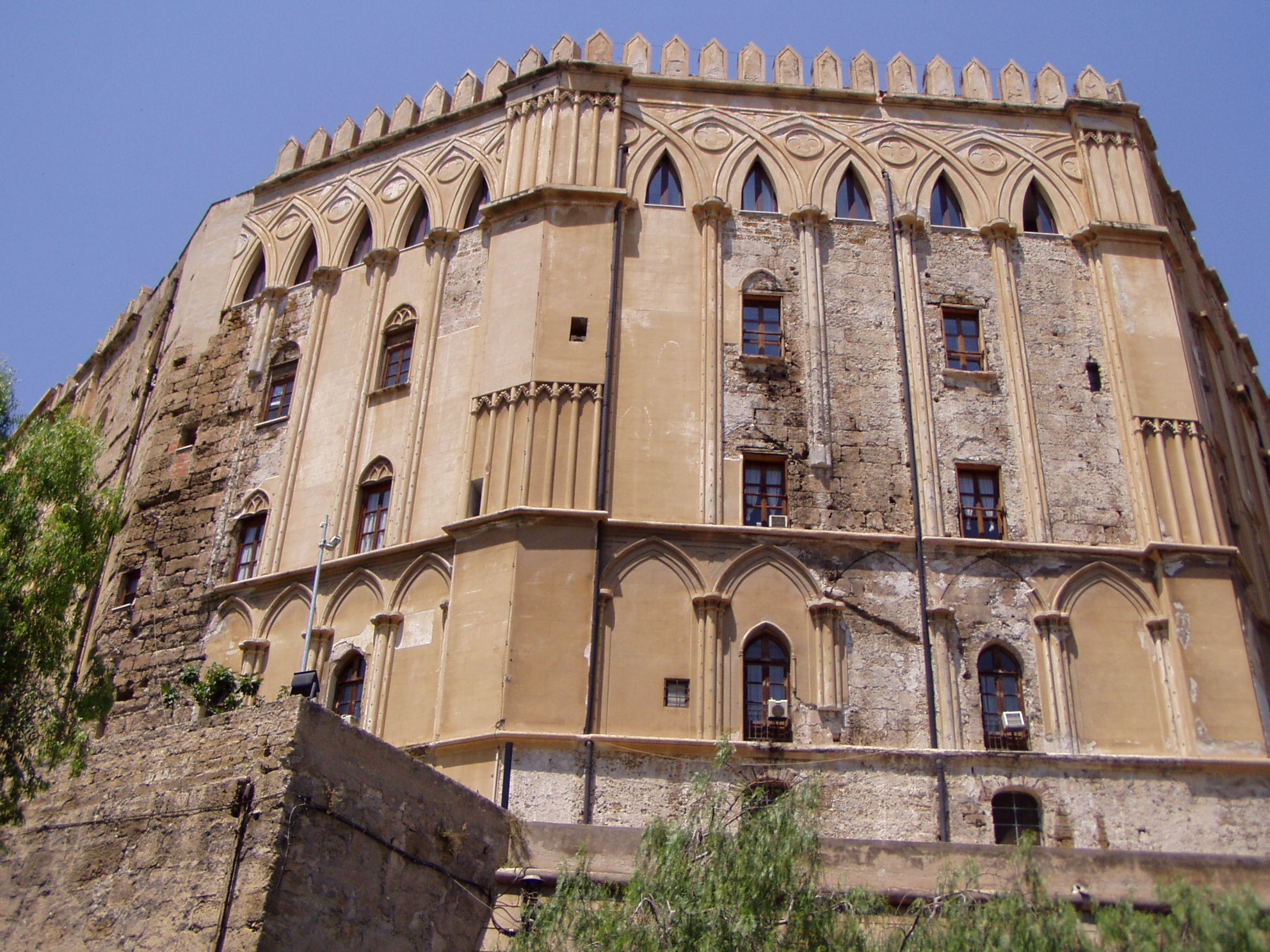
Palazzo Reale in Palermo, built by Roger II (1st half of the 12th century)

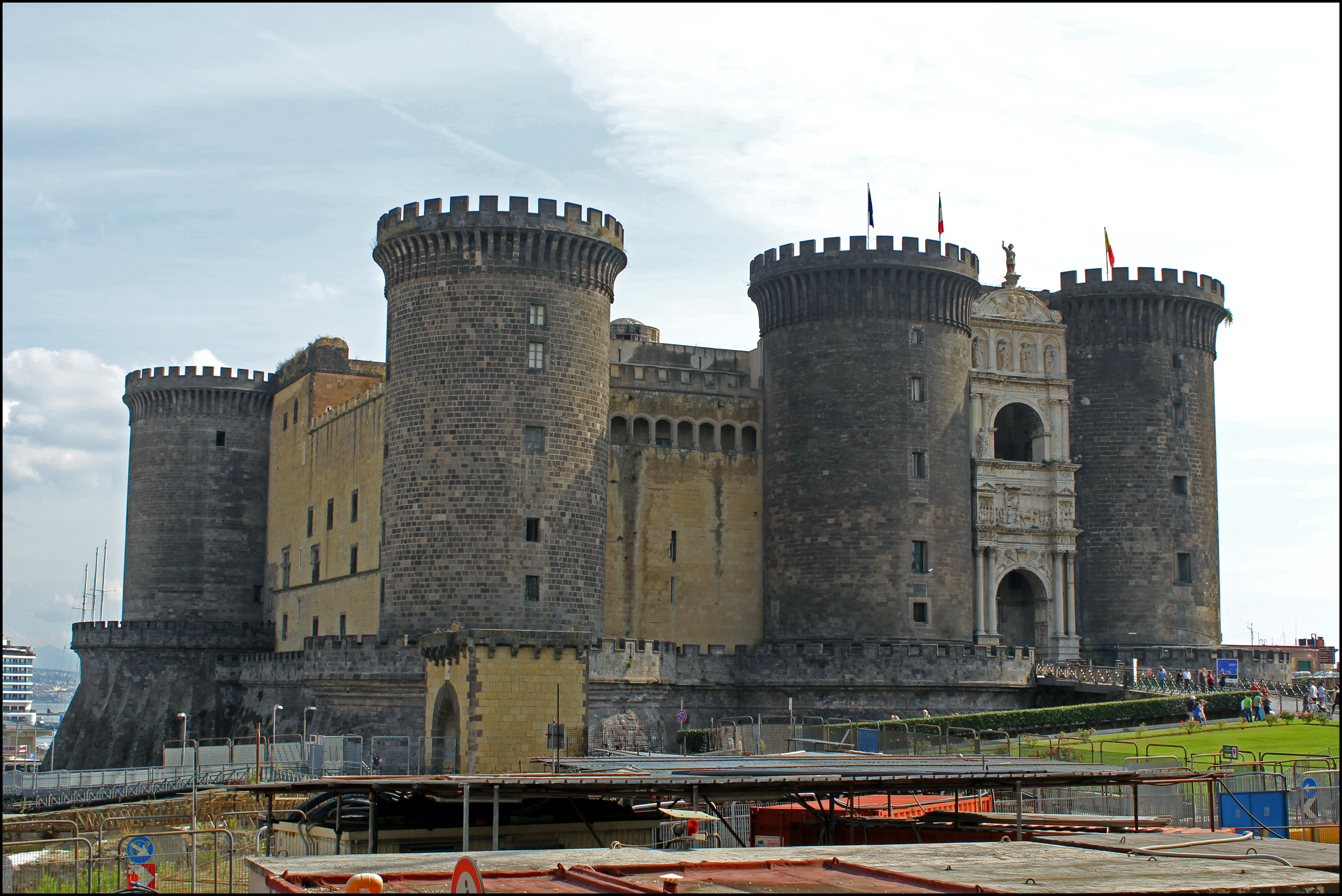
Castel Nuovo in Naples, built from 1279

The previously Norman Kingdom of Sicily fell to the Staufer Henry VI, who had married Constance of Sicily in 1186, the daughter of the Norman King Roger II of Sicily and aunt and heiress of the last Norman King William II. Competing counter kings from the Norman ruling family were finally eliminated by military force. When Henry VI died unexpectedly in 1197 at the age of 32, Constance took over the rule of the Sicilian kingdom as regent for her son. He had been elected German King as Frederick II in 1196 at the age of two, but was no longer recognized as such after the death of his father. In 1212, at the instigation of the Pope Innocent III, he finally became German king, initially as an anti-king to Otto IV, and in 1220 he was crowned emperor. Frederick II (Frederick I of Sicily) rarely stayed on German soil, but ruled his empire from southern Italy. In contrast to the (Lombard-Tuscan) Kingdom of Italy north of the Papal States, the Kingdom of Sicily never became part of the Holy Roman Empire.

As a result of the escalating conflict between the Hohenstaufen dynasty and the papacy, the French prince Charles of Anjou was elevated to the Sicilian throne by Pope Clement IV in 1265. Charles took power in 1266 through his victory over the Hohenstaufen king Manfred, who had initially administered Sicily as regent for his underage and absent nephew Conradin, but had then assumed the royal title himself. As the last Hohenstaufen to lay claim to the Sicilian throne and fight for it, Conradin was captured in 1268 and executed by his opponent in Naples. Unlike in Naples, which was the focus of Angevin rule, French rule on Sicily was abolished after just a few years by the popular uprising of 1282, the Sicilian Vespers, which instead elevated Peter III of Aragon, a son-in-law of the Hohenstaufen king Manfred, to king of the island. The old Norman-Staufer kingdom was since then – despite mutual claims to power – effectively divided into the Aragonese Kingdom of Sicily and the Kingdom of Naples ruled by the Angevins. In the Peace of Caltabellotta 1302, the Aragonese king Frederick III of Sicily and the Angevin king Charles II of Naples recognized each other's rule, but the ancient name "Trinacria" was chosen for the island, while the title "King of Sicily" remained associated with Neapolitan rule, so that there were now two kingdoms called Sicily.

A brief "reunification" took place from Sicily, when in 1442 the Aragonese-Sicilian king Alfonso V also brought the Kingdom of Naples under his rule. With Alfonso's death, this southern Italian personal union dissolved again, since the Aragonese heir to the throne, John II (1458–1479), was only recognized in Sicily, but not in Naples, where Ferdinand (Ferrante, 1458–1494), an illegitimate son of Alfonso V, seized power in 1458. However, his descendants lost Naples in 1495, first to the French king Charles VIII, who claimed the old Anjou throne rights for himself, and at the end of the wars triggered by this in 1501/04 to King Ferdinand V of Aragon and Sicily (1479–1516).

=== Early Modern Period ===
Due to the dynastic union in 1494 between the Habsburgs and the houses of Aragon and Castile, Naples and Sicily also fell to Charles V in 1516.

With the extinction of the Spanish Habsburgs in 1700, Naples and Sicily were caught up in the turmoil of the War of the Spanish Succession. After initial rule by the Bourbons, who now ruled in Spain, Central Italy was occupied by Austria in 1707/08, whose Habsburg line also laid claim to the kingdom.

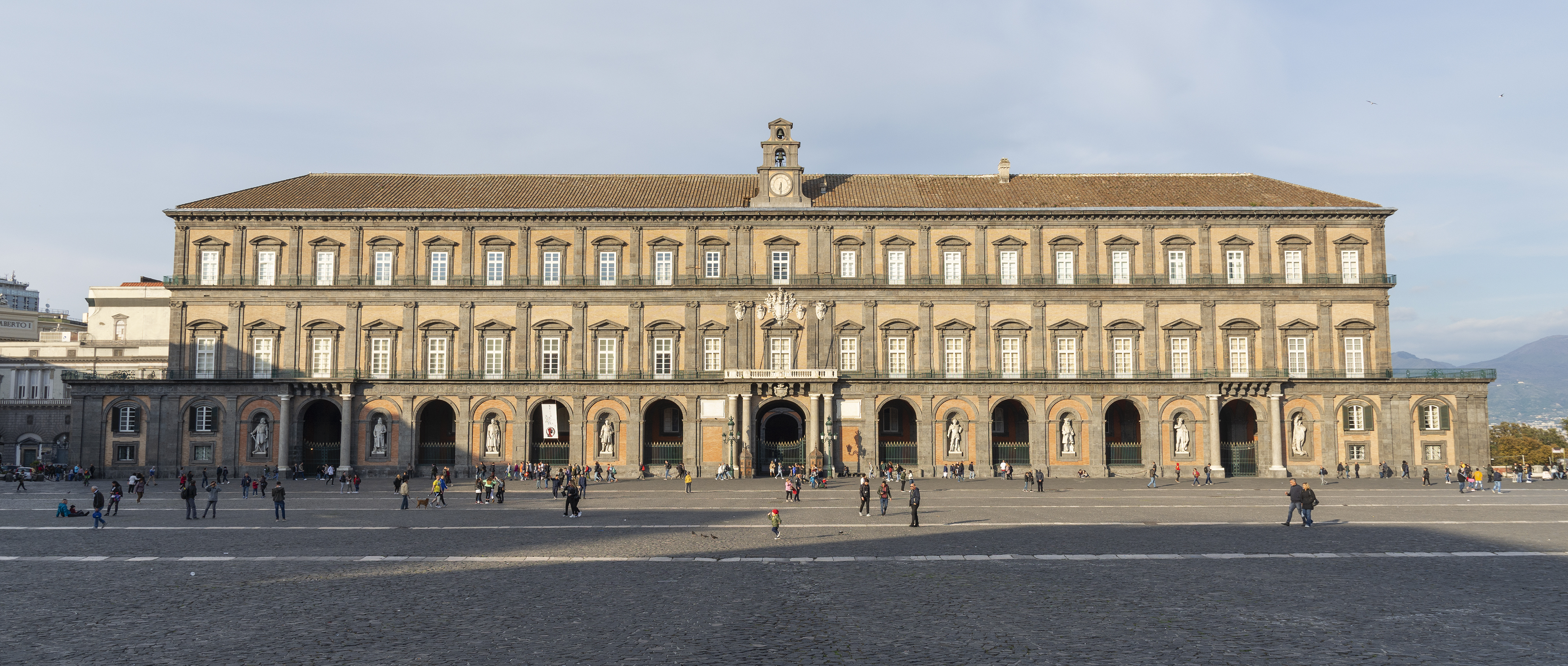
Royal Palace in Naples

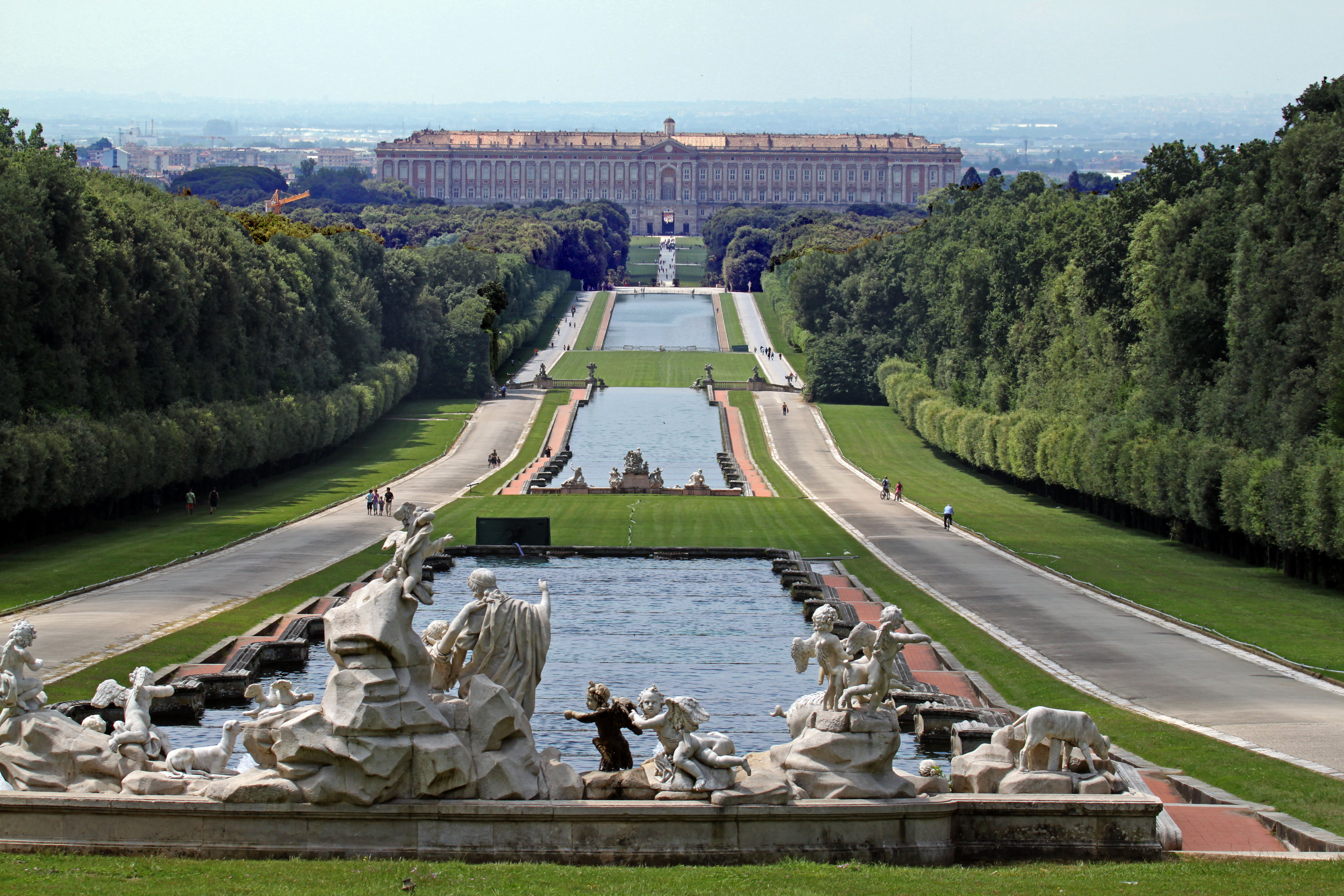
Palace of Caserta

The peace treaties of 1713/14 (Utrecht/Rastatt) left the Kingdom of Naples with Austria, but assigned the Kingdom of Sicily to Victor Amadeus of Savoy, who exchanged it with the Habsburgs in 1720 for Sardinia. Since then, people have spoken of "Naples-Sicily". Until 1735, the Kingdoms of Naples and Sicily were ruled by Austria.

In the War of the Polish Succession the Austrians were harassed by Spanish troops who supported the claims of the Duke of Parma and Spanish Infante Charles to Naples and Sicily; the Spanish were victorious at Bitonto in 1734.

Infante Charles of the House of Bourbon ruled both Sicilies from the mid 18th century, until he became King of Spain. He was the first king of Naples and Sicily in over 230 years to live and rule there personally. The center of power remained Naples, which was magnificently expanded by the new Bourbon kings, while Sicily retained a secondary and semi-colonial status. North of Naples, Charles began the construction of a baroque planned city in Caserta and planned to move the seat of government to the Palace of Caserta. He attempted to rebuild the relatively weak state with enlightened reforms directed particularly against the influence of the Roman Catholic Church.

When this assertive monarch became King of Spain in 1759, he had to cede his former empire to his younger son Ferdinand IV, who founded the Bourbon-Sicily collateral line, because the Spanish crown could not be united with Naples-Sicily according to international treaties. This line was united with the Austrian Habsburgs through the marriage of Ferdinand IV and Maria Carolina of Austria, a daughter of Empress Maria Theresa, on 12 May 1768. Initially dominated by the dual influence of the great powers Spain and Austria, Naples-Sicily – particularly in the course of the French Revolutionary Wars from 1792 onwards – became increasingly dependent on the naval power Great Britain to defend itself against the new European superpower, France.

== History ==
=== 1816–1848 ===
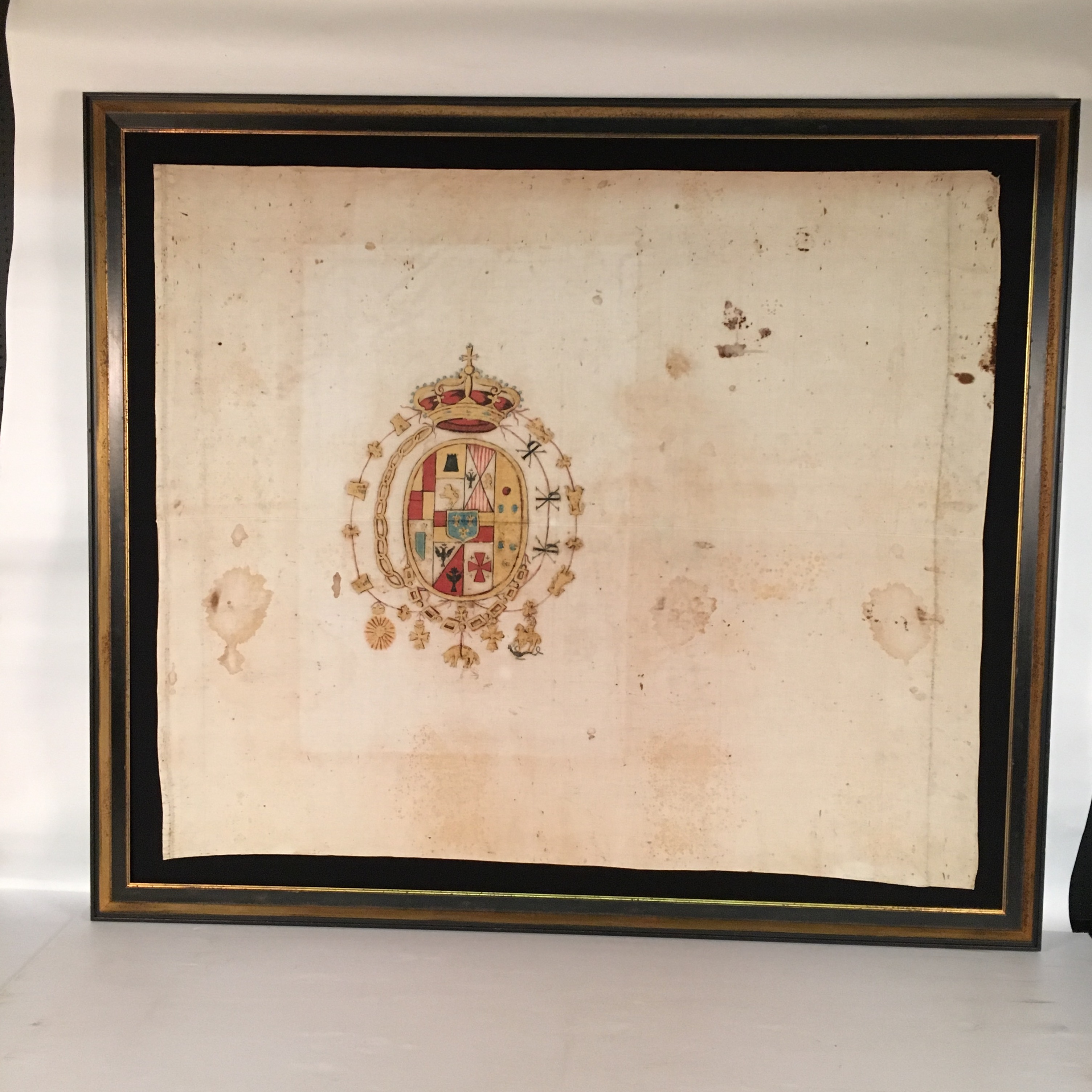
Framed antique flag of the Kingdom of the Two Sicilies (c. 1830s) discovered in Palermo

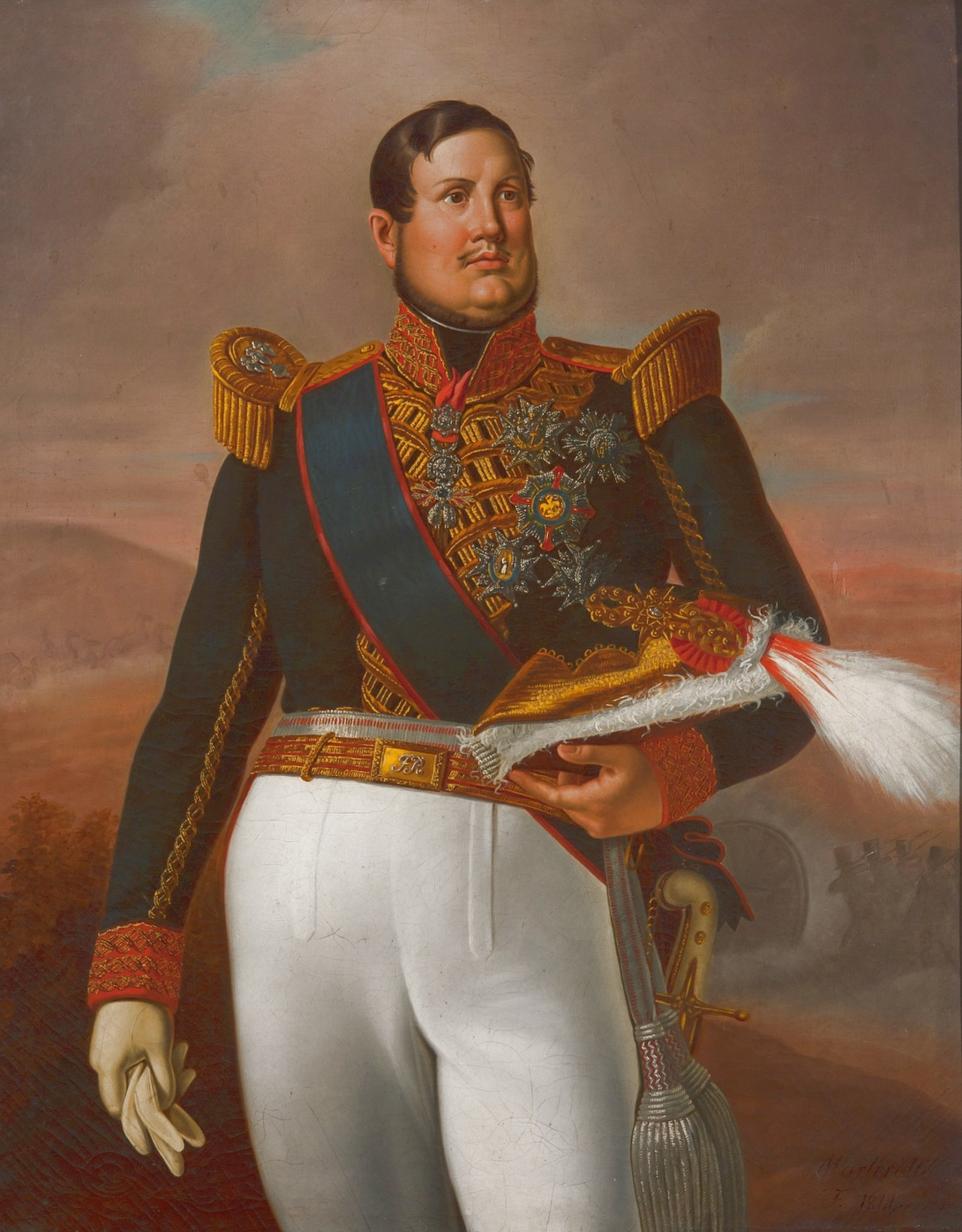
Portrait of King Ferdinand II, 1844

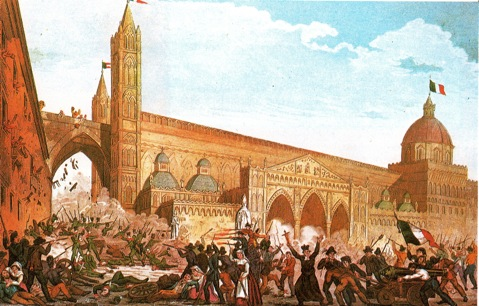
1848 revolution in Sicily

The Treaty of Casalanza restored Ferdinand IV of Bourbon to the throne of Naples and the island of Sicily (where the constitution of 1812 had virtually disempowered him) was returned to him. In 1816 he annulled the constitution and Sicily became fully reintegrated into the new state, which was now officially called the Regno delle Due Sicilie (Kingdom of Two Sicilies). Ferdinand IV became Ferdinand I.

A few of the deeds under the administration of Kings Joseph and Joachim Murat, such as some reforms to their civil code, the penal and commercial code, were kept (and extended to Sicily). In the mainland parts of the Kingdom, the power and influence of both nobility and clergy had been greatly reduced, though at the expense of law and order. Brigandage and the forceful occupation of lands were problems the restored Kingdom inherited from its predecessors.

The Congress of Vienna had granted Austria the right to station troops in the kingdom, and Austria, as well as Russia and Prussia, insisted that no written constitution was to be granted to the kingdom. In October 1815, Joachim Murat landed in Calabria, in an attempt to regain his kingdom. The government responded to acts of collaboration or of terrorism with severe repression and by June 1816 Murat's attempt had failed and the situation was under government control. However, the Neapolitan administration had changed from conciliatory to reactionary policies. The French novelist Henri de Stendhal, who visited Naples in 1817, called the kingdom "an absurd monarchy in the style of Philip II".

As open political activity was suppressed, liberals organized themselves in secret societies, such as the Carbonari, an organization whose origins date back into the French period and which had been outlawed in 1816. In 1820 a revolution planned by Carbonari and their supporters, aimed at obtaining a written constitution (the Spanish constitution of 1812), did not work out as planned. Nevertheless, King Ferdinand felt compelled to grant the constitution sought by the liberals (13 July). That same month, a revolution broke out in Palermo, Sicily, but was quickly suppressed. Rebels from Naples occupied Benevento and Pontecorvo, two enclaves belonging to the Papal States. At the Congress of Troppau (19 Nov.), the Holy Alliance (Metternich being the driving force) decided to intervene. On 23 February 1821, in front of 50,000 Austrian troops paraded outside his capital, King Ferdinand cancelled the constitution. An attempt at Neapolitan resistance to the Austrians by regular forces under General Guglielmo Pepe, as well as by irregular rebel forces (Carbonari), was smashed and on 24 March 1821 Austrian forces entered the city of Naples.

Political repression then only intensified. Lawlessness in the countryside was aggravated by the problem of administrative corruption. A coup was attempted in 1828 with the aim of forcing the promulgation of a constitution, but it was suppressed by Neapolitan troops (the Austrian army having left the previous year). King Francis I (1825–1830) died after visiting Paris, where he witnessed the 1830 revolution. In 1829 he had created the Royal Order of Merit (Royal Order of Francis I of the Two Sicilies). His successor Ferdinand II declared a political amnesty and took steps to stimulate the economy, including reduction of taxation. Visible signs of progress included the introduction of street lighting in Naples and the opening in 1839 of the railroad from Naples to Portici (despite the opposition of the Church to the construction of tunnels on account of their 'obscenity').

In 1836 the kingdom was struck by a cholera epidemic which killed 65,000 in Sicily alone. In the following years the Neapolitan countryside saw sporadic local insurrections. In the 1840s, clandestine political pamphlets circulated, evading censorship. Moreover, in September 1847 an uprising saw insurrectionists crossing from mainland Calabria over to Sicily before government forces were able to suppress them. On 12 January 1848, an open rebellion began in Palermo and demands were made for the reintroduction of the 1812 constitution. King Ferdinand II appointed a liberal prime minister, broke off diplomatic relations with Austria and even declared war on the latter (7 April). Although revolutionaries who had risen in several mainland cities outside Naples shortly after the Sicilians approved of the new measures (April 1848), Sicily continued with her revolution. Faced with these differing reactions to his moves, King Ferdinand, using the Swiss Guard, took the initiative and ordered the suppression of the revolution in Naples (15 May) and by July the mainland was again under royal control and by September, also Messina. Palermo, the revolutionaries' capital and last stronghold, fell to the government some months later on 15 May 1849.

=== 1848–1861 ===
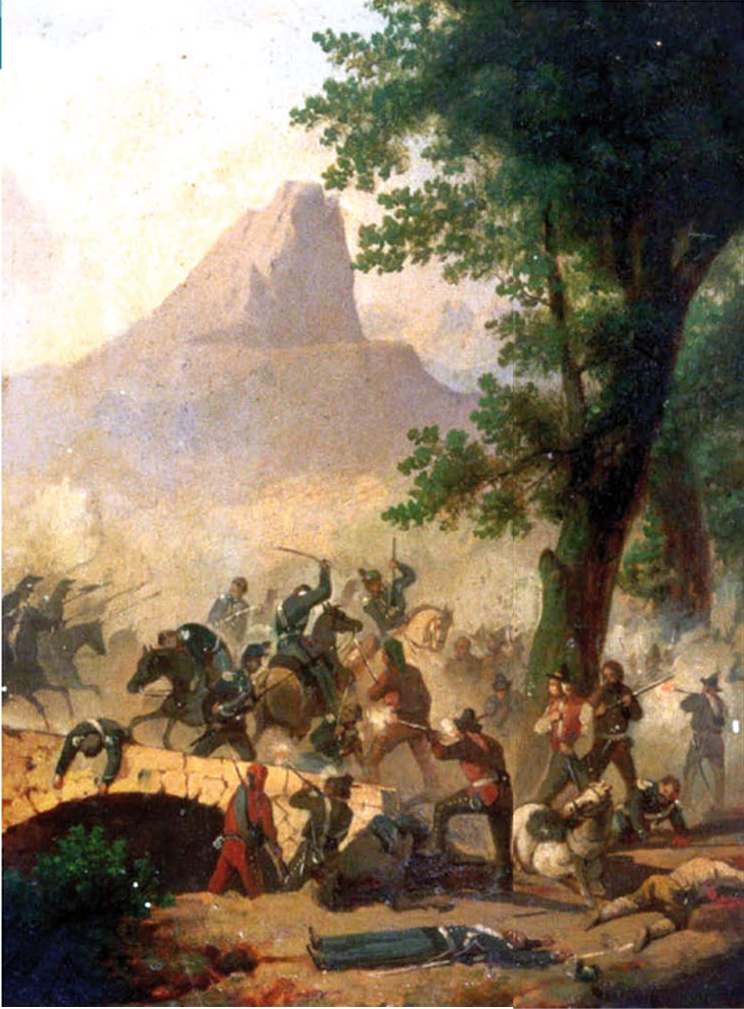
Skirmish between brigands and troops in the countryside

The Kingdom of Two Sicilies, over the course of 1848–1849, had been able to suppress the revolution and the attempt of Sicilian secession with their own forces, hired Swiss Guards included. The war declared on Austria in April 1848, under pressure of public sentiment, had been an event on paper only.

In 1849 King Ferdinand II was 39 years old. He had begun as a reformer; the early death of his wife (1836), the frequency of political unrest, the extent and range of political expectations on the side of various groups that made up public opinion, had caused him to pursue a cautious, yet authoritarian policy aiming at the prevention of the occurrence of yet another rebellion. Over half of the delegates elected to parliament in the liberal atmosphere of 1848 were arrested or fled the country. The administration, in their treatment of political prisoners, in their observation of 'suspicious elements', violated the rights of the individual guaranteed by the constitution. Conditions were so bad that they caused international attention; in 1856 Britain and France demanded the release of the political prisoners. When this was rejected, both countries broke off diplomatic relations. The Kingdom pursued an economic policy of protectionism; the country's economy was mainly based on agriculture, the cities, especially Naples – with over 400,000 inhabitants, Italy's largest – "a center of consumption rather than of production" (Santore p. 163) and home to poverty most expressed by the masses of Lazzaroni, the poorest class.

After visiting Naples in 1850, Gladstone began to support Neapolitan opponents of the Bourbon rulers: his "support" consisted of a couple of letters that he sent from Naples to the Parliament in London, describing the "awful conditions" of the Kingdom of Southern Italy and claiming that "it is the negation of God erected to a system of government". Gladstone's letters provoked sensitive reactions in the whole of Europe and helped to cause its diplomatic isolation before the invasion and annexation of the Kingdom of the Two Sicilies by the Kingdom of Sardinia, with the following foundation of modern Italy. Administratively, Naples and Sicily remained separate units; in 1858 the Neapolitan Postal Service issued her first postage stamps; that of Sicily followed in 1859.

In 1853, the Military Order of the Collar of Saint Agatha of Paternò, a dynastic order of the House of Paternò, was recognised by the Kingdom of the Two Sicilies in a document signed by King Francesco II. It became one of only three orders of knighthood permitted to be work in the Kingdom, alongside orders of knighthood of the Holy See and the Order of Malta.

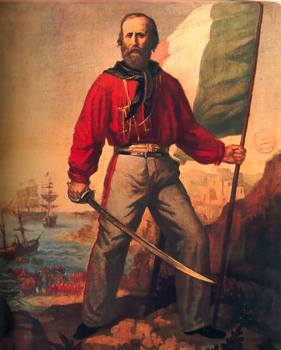
Giuseppe Garibaldi lands in Marsala, Sicily, during the Expedition of the Thousand (by Gerolamo Induno)

Until 1849, the political movement among the bourgeoisie, at times revolutionary, had been Neapolitan respectively Sicilian rather than Italian in its tendency; Sicily in 1848–1849 had striven for a higher degree of independence from Naples rather than for a unified Italy. As public sentiment for Italian unification was rather low in the Kingdom of the Two Sicilies, the country did not feature as an object of acquisition in the earlier plans of Piemont-Sardinia's prime minister Cavour. Only when Austria was defeated in 1859 and the unification of Northern Italy (except Venetia) was accomplished in 1860, did Giuseppe Garibaldi, at the head of the Expedition of the Thousand, launch his invasion of Sicily, with the connivance of Cavour (once in Sicily, many rallied to his colours); after a successful campaign in Sicily, he crossed over to the mainland and won the battle of the Volturno with half of his army being local volunteers. King Francis II (since 1859) withdrew to the fortified port of Gaeta, where he surrendered and abdicated in February 1861 after the Siege of Gaeta. At the encounter of Teano, Garibaldi met King Victor Emmanuel, transferring to him the conquered kingdom, the Two Sicilies were annexed into the Kingdom of Sardinia, which became the Kingdom of Italy in 1861.

== Arts patronage ==
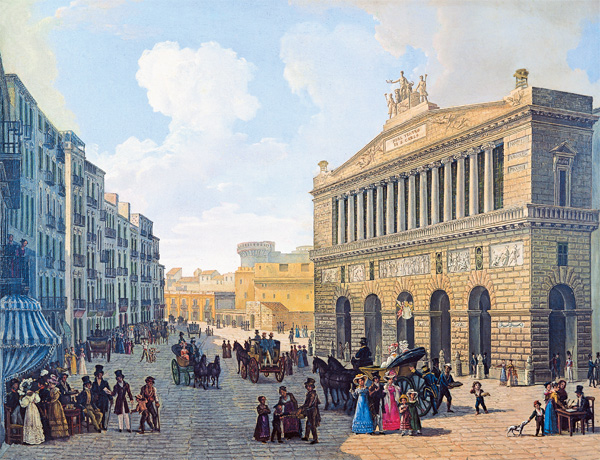
The Teatro Reale di San Carlo in Naples, 1830, as rebuilt after the 1816 fire. It is the oldest continuously active venue for opera in the world.

The Real Teatro di San Carlo was commissioned by the Bourbon King Charles VII of Naples who wanted to grant Naples a new and larger theatre to replace the old, dilapidated, and too-small Teatro San Bartolomeo of 1621, which had served the city well, especially after Scarlatti had moved there in 1682 and had begun to create an important opera centre which existed well into the 1700s. Thus, the San Carlo was inaugurated on 4 November 1737, the king's name day, with the performance of Domenico Sarro's opera Achille in Sciro and much admired for its architecture the San Carlo was now the biggest opera house in the world.

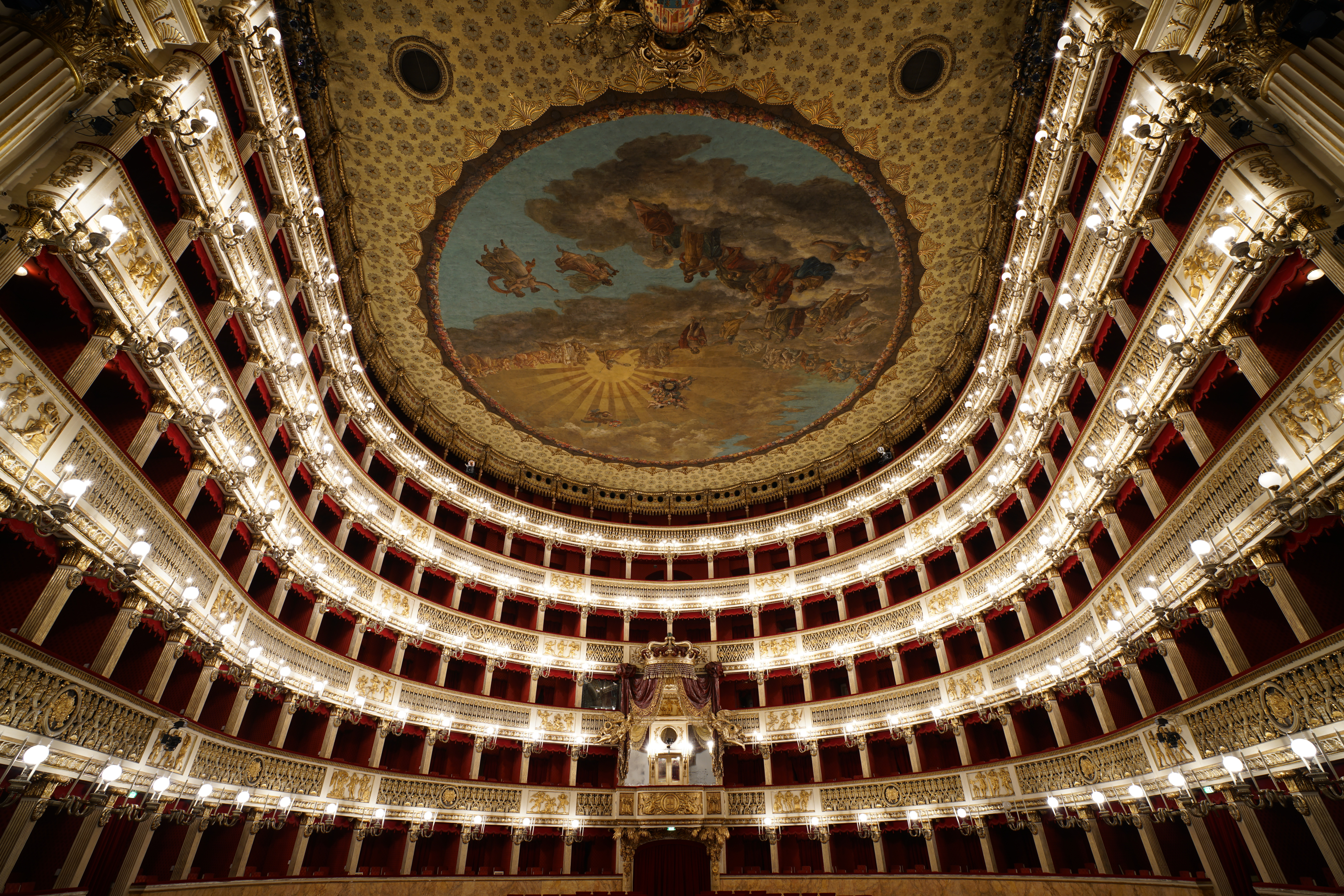
View of the interior, with the royal box

On 13 February 1816 a fire broke out during a dress-rehearsal for a ballet performance and quickly spread to destroy a part of the building. On the orders of King Ferdinand I, who used the services of Antonio Niccolini, to rebuild the opera house within ten months as a traditional horseshoe-shaped auditorium with 1,444 seats, and a proscenium, 33.5m wide and 30m high. The stage was 34.5m deep. Niccolini embellished in the inner of the bas-relief depicting "Time and the Hour". Stendhal attended the second night of the inauguration and wrote: "There is nothing in all Europe, I won't say comparable to this theatre, but which gives the slightest idea of what it is like..., it dazzles the eyes, it enraptures the soul...".

From 1815 to 1822, Gioachino Rossini was the house composer and artistic director of the royal opera houses, including the San Carlo. During this period he wrote ten operas which were Elisabetta, regina d'Inghilterra (1815), La gazzetta, Otello, ossia il Moro di Venezia (1816), Armida (1817), Mosè in Egitto, Ricciardo e Zoraide (1818), Ermione, Bianca e Falliero, Eduardo e Cristina, La donna del lago (1819), Maometto II (1820), and Zelmira (1822), many premiered at the San Carlo. An offer in 1822 from Domenico Barbaja, the impresario of the San Carlo, which followed the composer's ninth opera, led to Gaetano Donizetti's move to Naples and his residency there which lasted until the production of Caterina Cornaro in January 1844. In all, Naples presented 51 of Donizetti's operas. Also Vincenzo Bellini's first professionally staged opera had its first performance at the Teatro di San Carlo in Naples on 30 May 1826.

== Historical population ==
Year	Kingdom of Naples	Kingdom of Sicily	Total	Ref.
1819	5,733,430	–	–	
1827	–	–	~7,420,000	
1828	6,177,598	–	–	
1832	–	1,906,033	–	
1839	6,113,259	–	~8,000,000	
1840	6,117,598	~<1,800,000 (est.)	~7,900,000 (est.)	
1848	6,382,706	2,046,610	8,429,316	
1851	6,612,892	2,041,583	8,704,472	
1856	6,886,030	2,231,020	9,117,050	
1859/60	6,986,906	2,294,373	9,281,279	

The kingdom had a large population: its capital Naples was the biggest city in Italy, at least three times as large as any other contemporary Italian state. At its peak, the kingdom had a military with 100,000 soldiers strong, and a large bureaucracy. Naples was the largest city in the kingdom and the third largest city in Europe. The second largest city, Palermo, was the third largest in Italy. In the 1800s, the population rose from about five to seven million. It held approximately 36% of Italy's population around 1850.

Because the kingdom did not establish a statistical department until after 1848, most population statistics before that year are based on estimates and on censuses that were thought by contemporaries to be inaccurate.

== Military ==
The Army of the Two Sicilies was the kingdom's land force. It was created by the settlement of the Bourbon dynasty in Southern Italy after the War of the Polish Succession. The army have suppressed rebels some times, including the Calabrian revolution of 1847, and the Sicilian independence revolution of 1848, but collapsed during the Expedition of the Thousand in 1860.

The Real Marina was the kingdom's naval force. It was the most important of the pre-unification Italian navies.

== Economy ==
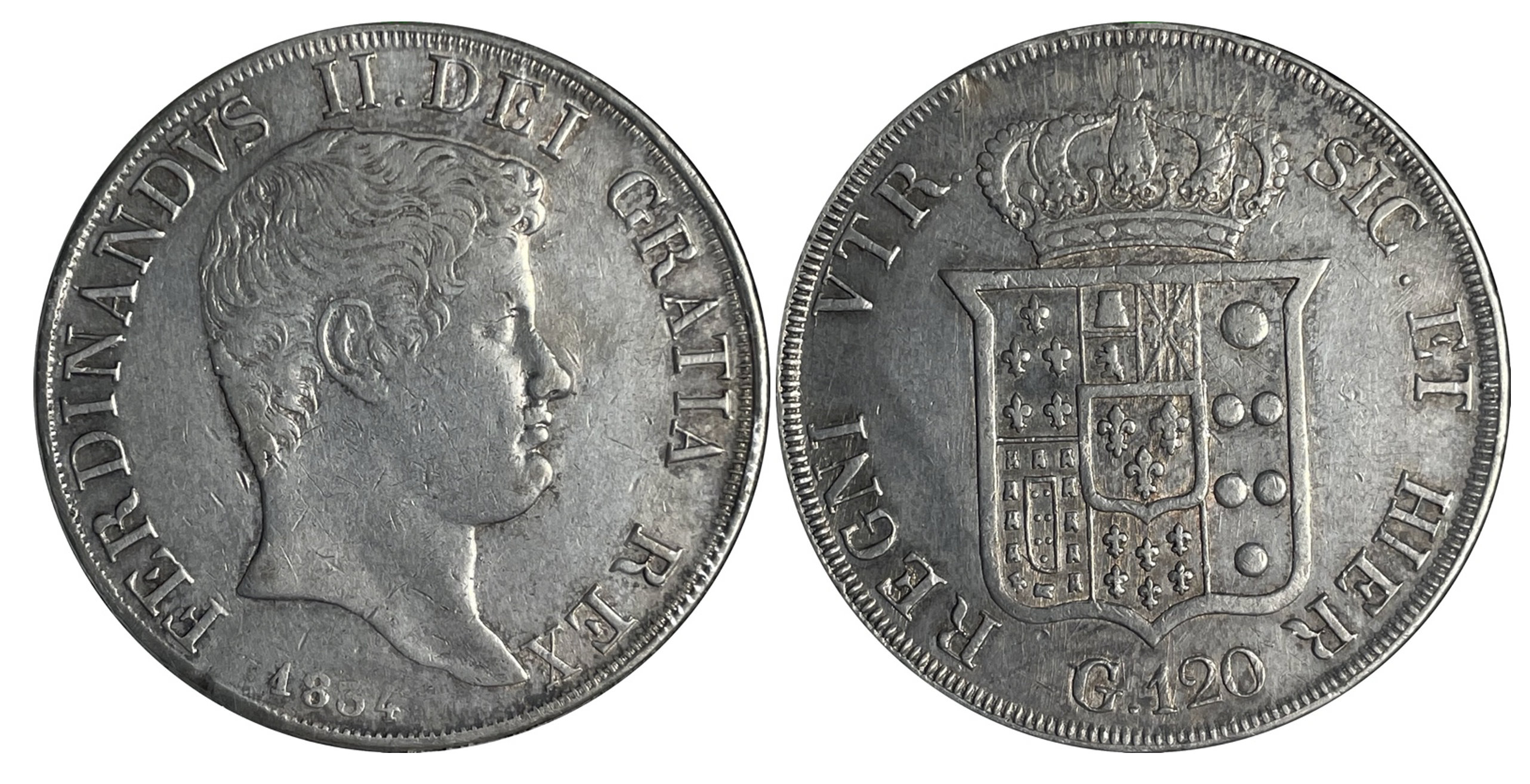
Silver coin: 120 grana Ferdinando II – 1834

A major problem was the distribution of land property: most of it concentrated in the hands of a few families, the landed nobility. The villages housed a large rural proletariat, desperately poor and dependent on the landlords for work. The kingdom's few cities had little industry, thus not providing the outlet for excess rural population found in northern Italy, France or Germany. The figures above show that the population of the countryside rose at a faster rate than that of the city of Naples herself: rather unusual for a time when much of Europe was experiencing the Industrial Revolution.

=== Agriculture ===
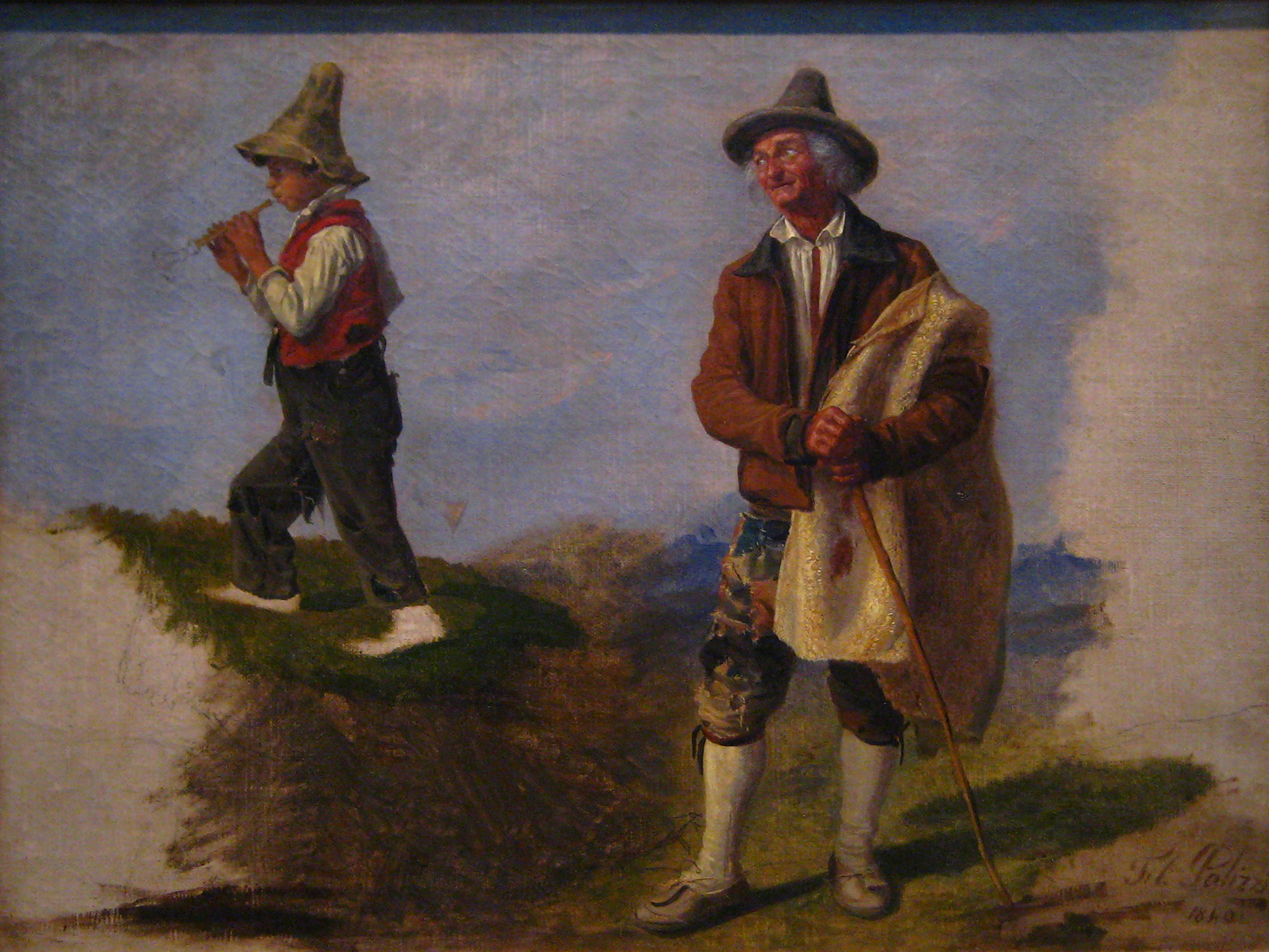
Contadini from the Neapolitan countryside by Filippo Palazzi, 1840

As registered in the 1827 census, for the Neapolitan (continental) part of the kingdom, 1,475,314 of the male population were listed as husbandmen, which traditionally consisted of three classes:

- the Borgesi (yeomanry),
- the Inquilani (small-farmers) and
- the Contadini (peasantry)

along with 65,225 listed as shepherds. Wheat, wine, olive oil and cotton were the chief products. Annual production, as recorded in 1844, was 67 million liters of olive oil largely produced in Apulia and Calabria and loaded for export at Gallipoli along with 191 million liters of wine that were for the most part consumed domestically. On the island of Sicily, in 1839, due to less arable lands, the output was much smaller than on the mainland, but about 115,000 acres (47,000 hectares) of vineyards and about 260,000 acres (105,000 hectares) of orchards, mainly fig, orange and citrus, were cultivated.

=== Industry ===
One of the most important industrial complexes in the kingdom was the shipyard of Castellammare di Stabia, which employed 1800 workers. The engineering factory of Pietrarsa was the largest industrial plant in the Italian peninsula, producing tools, cannons, rails, and locomotives. The complex also included a school for train drivers and naval engineers, and, thanks to this school, the kingdom was able to replace the English personnel who had been necessary until then. The first steamboat with screw propulsion known in Italy was the Giglio delle Onde, with mail delivery and passenger transport purposes after 1847.

In Calabria, the Fonderia Ferdinandea was a large foundry where cast iron was produced. The Reali ferriere ed Officine di Mongiana was an iron foundry and weapons factory. Founded in 1770, it employed 1600 workers in 1860 and closed in 1880. In Sicily (near Catania and Agrigento), sulfur was mined to make gunpowder. The Sicilian mines were able to satisfy most of the global demand for sulfur. Silk cloth production was focused in San Leucio (near Caserta). The region of Basilicata also had several mills in Potenza and San Chirico Raparo, where cotton, wool and silk were processed. Food processing was widespread, especially near Naples (Torre Annunziata and Gragnano).

==== Sulphur ====
The kingdom maintained a sulphur mining industry, which produced most of the world's sulphur and expanded in response to demand from an increasingly industrialized Britain. Following the Parliament of the United Kingdom's repeal of tariffs on salt in 1824, British demand for Sicilian sulphur surged. The growing British influence over the Sicilian sulphur industry eventually led to the Sulphur Crisis of 1840. The crisis began King Ferdinand II granted a monopoly on the Sicilian sulphur industry to a French company, in violation of an 1816 trade agreement with Britain. A peaceful solution was eventually negotiated by France.

==== Textile industry ====
In the Salerno area and in the Sarno Valley, there was a sort of textile hub, mainly run by entrepreneurs who were part of the substantial Swiss community in Campania (Von Willer, Meyer & Zottingen, Zublin & Co., Schlaepfer, Wenner & Co., Escher & Co.). Among the first Swiss to engage in textile production in the Kingdom of Naples, the Meuricoffre family (future bankers) and Johann Jakob Egg (1765-1843) are particularly remembered.

In 1812, Johann Jakob Egg was granted by the government an old monastery in Piedimonte d'Alife, which he quickly transformed into a modern factory with a workforce of 1,300 workers. Many of Egg's fellow countrymen, encouraged by his success, decided to settle in the Kingdom of the Two Sicilies, where cotton production (in the Vesuvian area) and wool production (in the Abruzzi) were abundant and of good quality.

Textile plants run by local entrepreneurs were also found in other provinces of the kingdom, such as the textile factories of the Sava, Zino, Manna, and Polsinelli families in Terra di Lavoro: in particular, in the Liri Valley there were over 15 wool mills which met a large part of the southern market's needs.

=== Transport ===
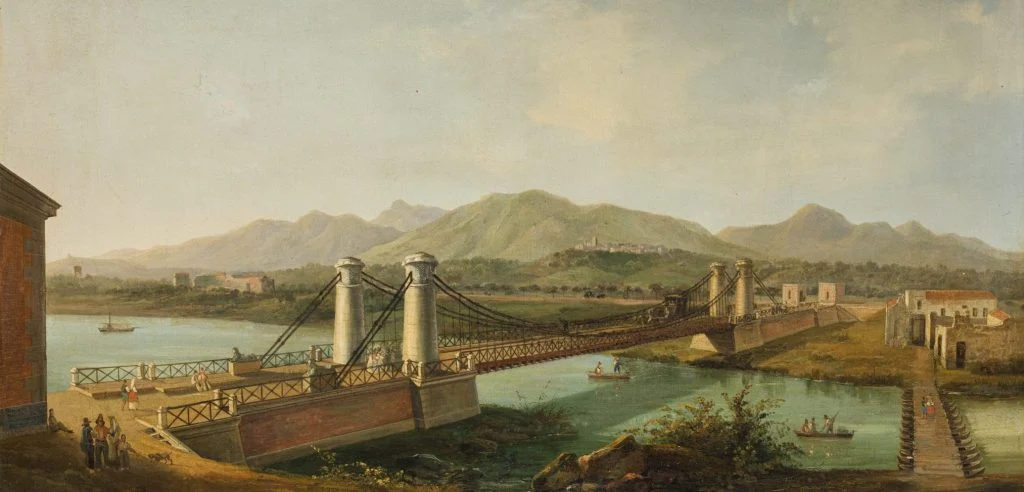
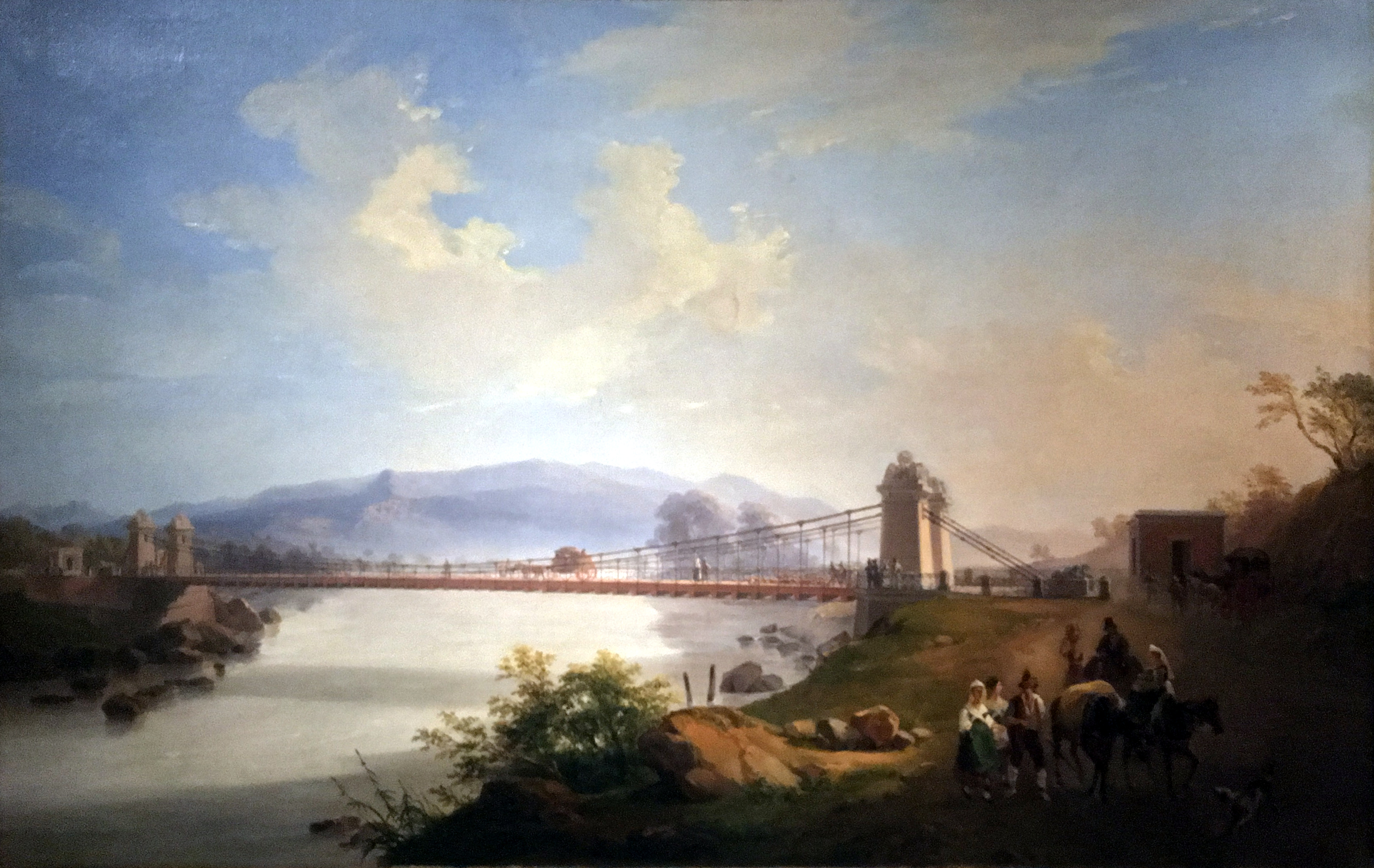
Clockwise from top:
- The two catenary suspension bridges built by Luigi Giura in 1832 and 1835, 1. the Real Ferdinando Bridge over the Garigliano and 2. the Maria Cristina Bridge over the Calore

With all of its major cities boasting ports, transport and trade in the Kingdom of the Two Sicilies was most efficiently conducted by sea. The kingdom possessed the largest merchant fleet in the Mediterranean. Urban road conditions, compared to Northern Italy, did not comply with the best European standards; by 1839, the main streets of Naples were gas-lit. Efforts were made to tackle the tough mountainous terrain; Ferdinand II built the cliff-top road along the Sorrentine peninsula. Road conditions in the interior and hinterland areas of the kingdom made internal trade difficult.

=== Technological and scientific achievements ===
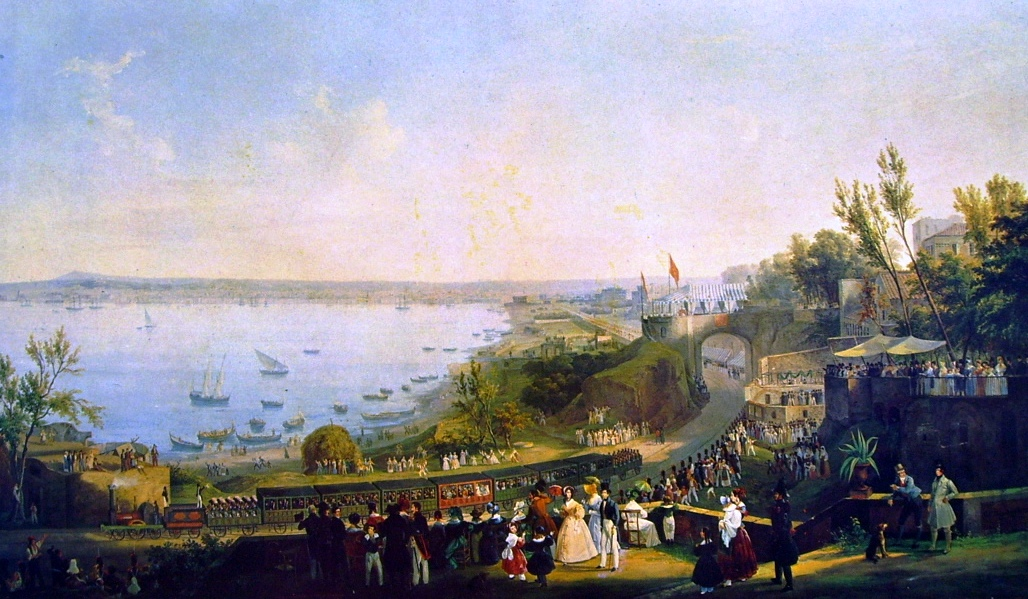
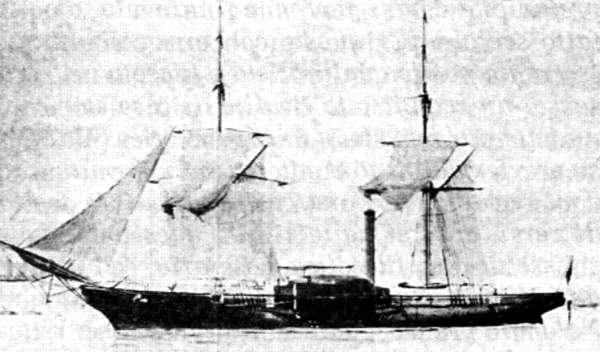
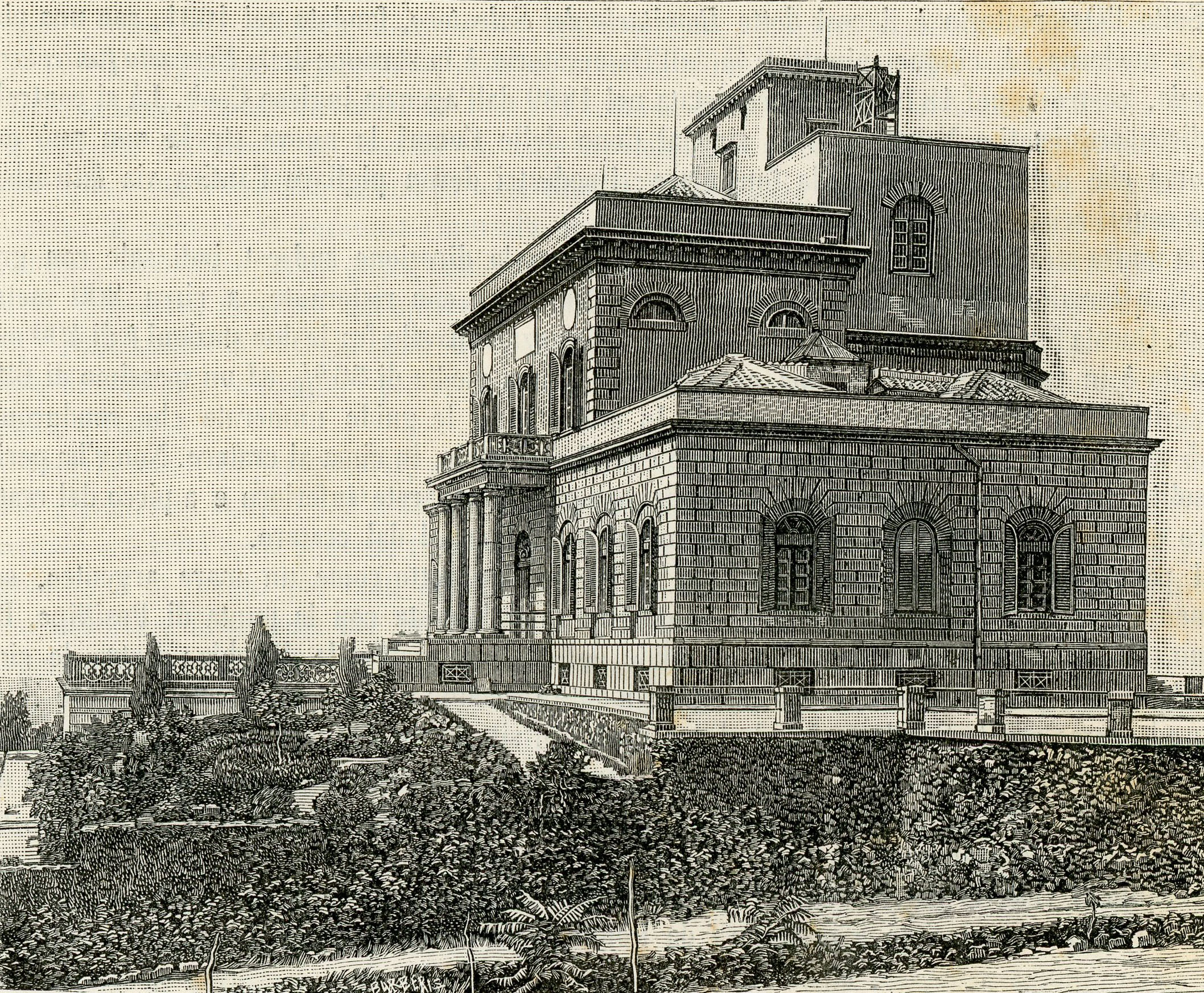
Clockwise from top:
- The Inauguration of the Naples–Portici railway, 1840
- The Vesuvius Observatory founded in 1841, the oldest volcanology institute in the world
- The first steamship built entirely at Castellamare with an engine from Pietrarsa, the 'Fieramosca' 1850

The kingdom achieved several scientific and technological accomplishments, such as the first steamboat in the Mediterranean Sea (1818), built in the shipyard of Stanislao Filosa at the Vigliena dock, near Naples, the first railway in the Italian peninsula (1839), which connected Naples to Portici, and the first iron-suspension bridge (the Real Ferdinando Bridge) in Italy. However, until the Italian unification, the railway development was highly limited. In the year 1859, the kingdom had only 99 kilometers of rail, compared to the 850 kilometers of Piedmont. Other achievements included the first volcano observatory in the world, l'Osservatorio Vesuviano (1841). The rails for the first Italian railways were built in Mongiana, Calabria, as well. All the rails of the old railways that went from the south to as far as Bologna were built in Mongiana.

=== Education ===
The kingdom was home to three universities namely those in Naples founded in 1224, Catania founded in 1434 and Palermo founded in 1806. Also in Naples, established by Matteo Ripa in 1732, was the Collegio dei Cinesi today the University of Naples "L'Orientale" teaching Sinology and Oriental studies. Despite these institutions of higher learning the kingdom however had no obligation for school attendance nor a recognizable school system. Clerics could inspect schools and had a veto power over appointments of teachers who were for the most part from the clergy anyhow. In 1859, for a population of 9 million inhabitants, there were only 2,010 primary schools with 67,428 pupils and 3,171 teachers. At the time of unification the literacy rate was just 14.4% in 1861.

== Geography ==
=== Departments ===
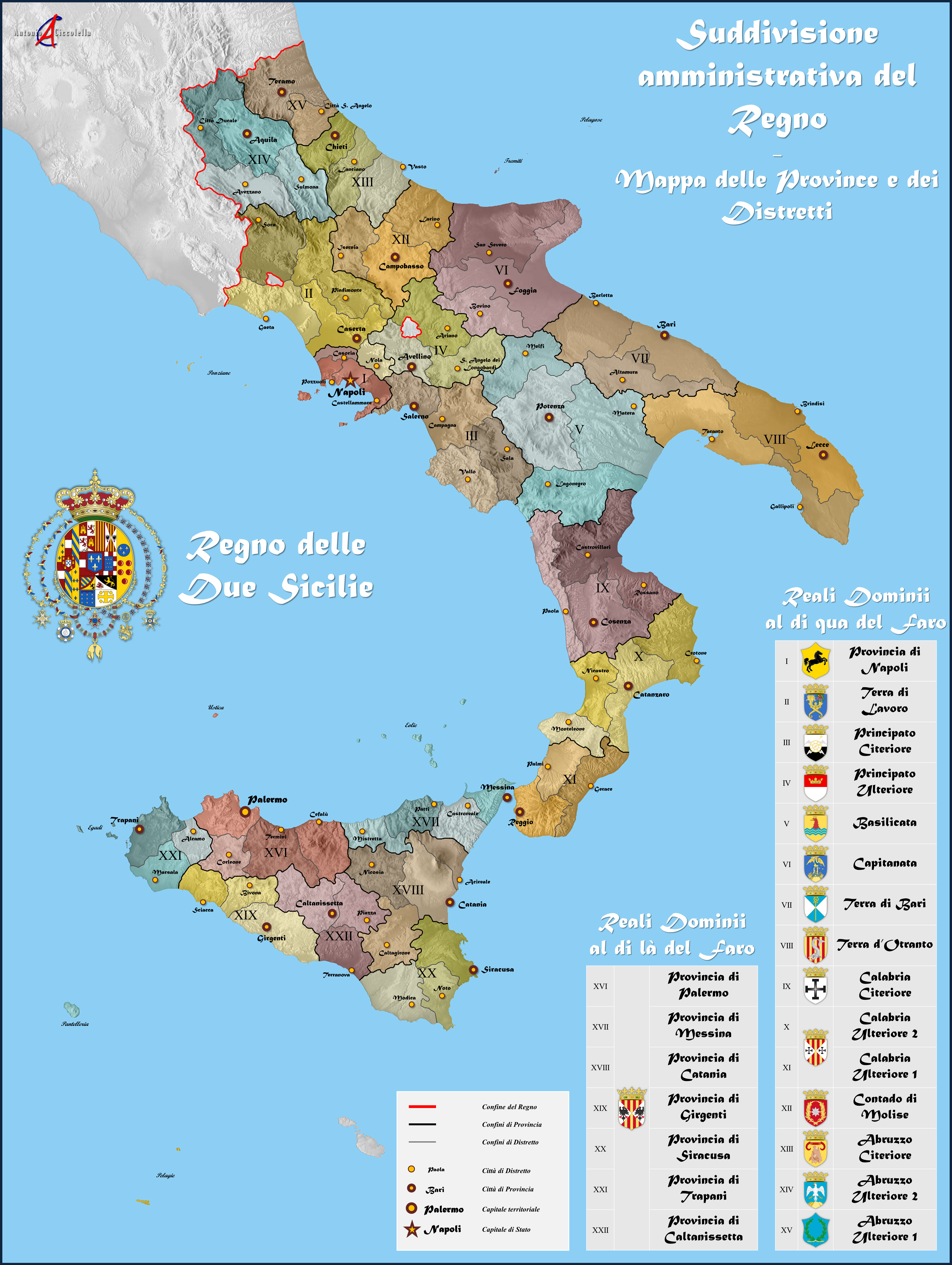
Departments and Districts of Kingdom of the Two Sicilies

The peninsula was divided into fifteen departments and Sicily was divided into seven departments. In 1860, when the Two Sicilies were conquered by the Kingdom of Sardinia, the departments became provinces of Italy, according to the Urbano Rattazzi law.

Peninsula departments

- Province of Naples – Naples
- Terra di Lavoro – Capua / Caserta from 1818
- Principato Citra – Salerno
- Principato Ultra – Avellino
- Basilicata – Potenza
- Capitanata – originally San Severo, then Foggia
- Terra di Bari – Bari
- Terra d'Otranto – Lecce
- Calabria Citra – Cosenza
- Calabria Ultra I – Reggio
- Calabria Ultra II – Catanzaro
- Contado di Molise – Campobasso
- Abruzzo Citra – Chieti
- Abruzzo Ultra I – Teramo
- Abruzzo Ultra II – Aquila

Insular departments

- Province of Caltanissetta – Caltanissetta
- Province of Catania – Catania
- Province of Girgenti – Girgenti
- Province of Messina – Messina
- Province of Noto – Noto
- Province of Palermo – Palermo
- Province of Trapani – Trapani

== Monarchs ==
Monarchs of the Two Sicilies
#	Image	Name (Dates)	Period of rule		Monogram
#	Image	Name (Dates)	Begin	End	Monogram
1		Ferdinand I (1751–1825)	12 December 1816	4 January 1825	
2		Francis I (1777–1830)	4 January 1825	8 November 1830	
3		Ferdinand II; The Bomb King (1810–1859)	8 November 1830	22 May 1859	
4		Francis II (1836–1894)	22 May 1859	20 March 1861	

In 1860–61, the kingdom was absorbed into the Kingdom of Sardinia, and the title dropped. It is still claimed by the head of the House of Bourbon-Two Sicilies.

== Flags of the Kingdom of the Two Sicilies ==
State flag
1816–1848; 1849–1860

State flag
1848–1849

State flag
1860–1861

Royal standard
1829–1861

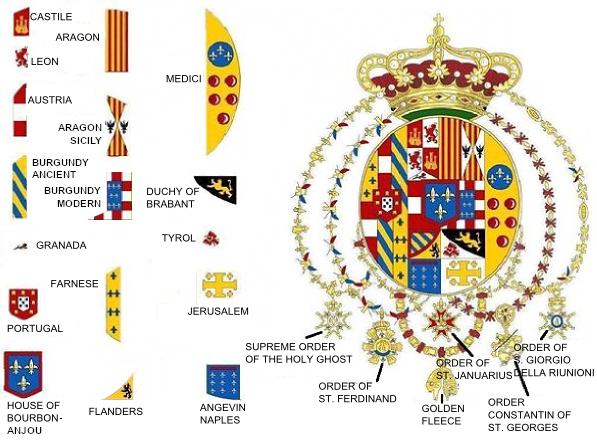
Description of the arms appearing in the flag

== Orders of knighthood ==
The following orders of knighthood were awarded in the Kingdom of the Two Sicilies:

- Order of Saint Januarius
- Sacred Military Constantinian Order of Saint George
- Order of Saint George and Reunion
- Order of Saint Ferdinand and Merit
- Royal Order of Francis I

== See also ==
- Dictatorship of Garibaldi
- List of historic states of Italy
- List of monarchs of the Kingdom of the Two Sicilies
- Plebiscites on Italian Unity
- Southern Italy
- Southern Italy autonomist movements
- Principato Ultra
