= Real Ferdinando Bridge =

Suspension bridge in Italy

Coordinates: 41°14′32″N 13°46′20″E

The catenary suspension bridge of Real Ferdinando or the Ferdinandeo Bridge over the River Garigliano was the first iron catenary suspension bridge built in Italy, and one of the earliest in continental Europe. This bridge, which was technologically advanced for its age, was built in 1832 by the Bourbon Kingdom of Two Sicilies. The engineer who designed the bridge was Luigi Giura.

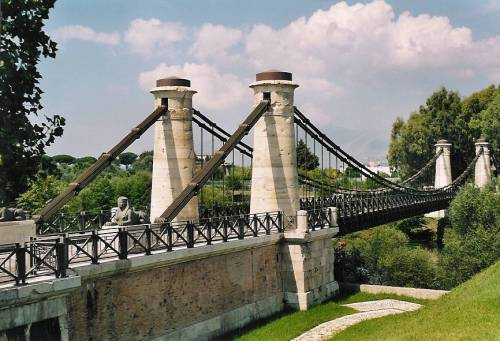
