= Pietro del Donzello =

Italian painter

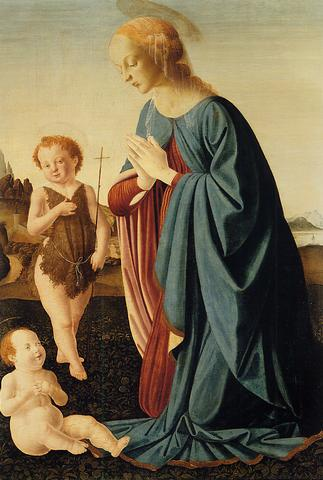
The Virgin adoring the Child and San Juanito by Pietro del Donzello, 1500

Pietro del Donzello (1452–1509) was an Italian painter.

Donzello was born in Florence. His brother Ippolito was also a painter. Pietro primarily painted traditional scenes and shields. Some of his other works reside at the Cleveland Museum of Art.

An overlap in stylistic choice from Piero della Francesca can be seen through Donzello's work, most notably with his brushstroke technique and canvas choices.
