= Nepi =

- Comune
- Comune di Nepi
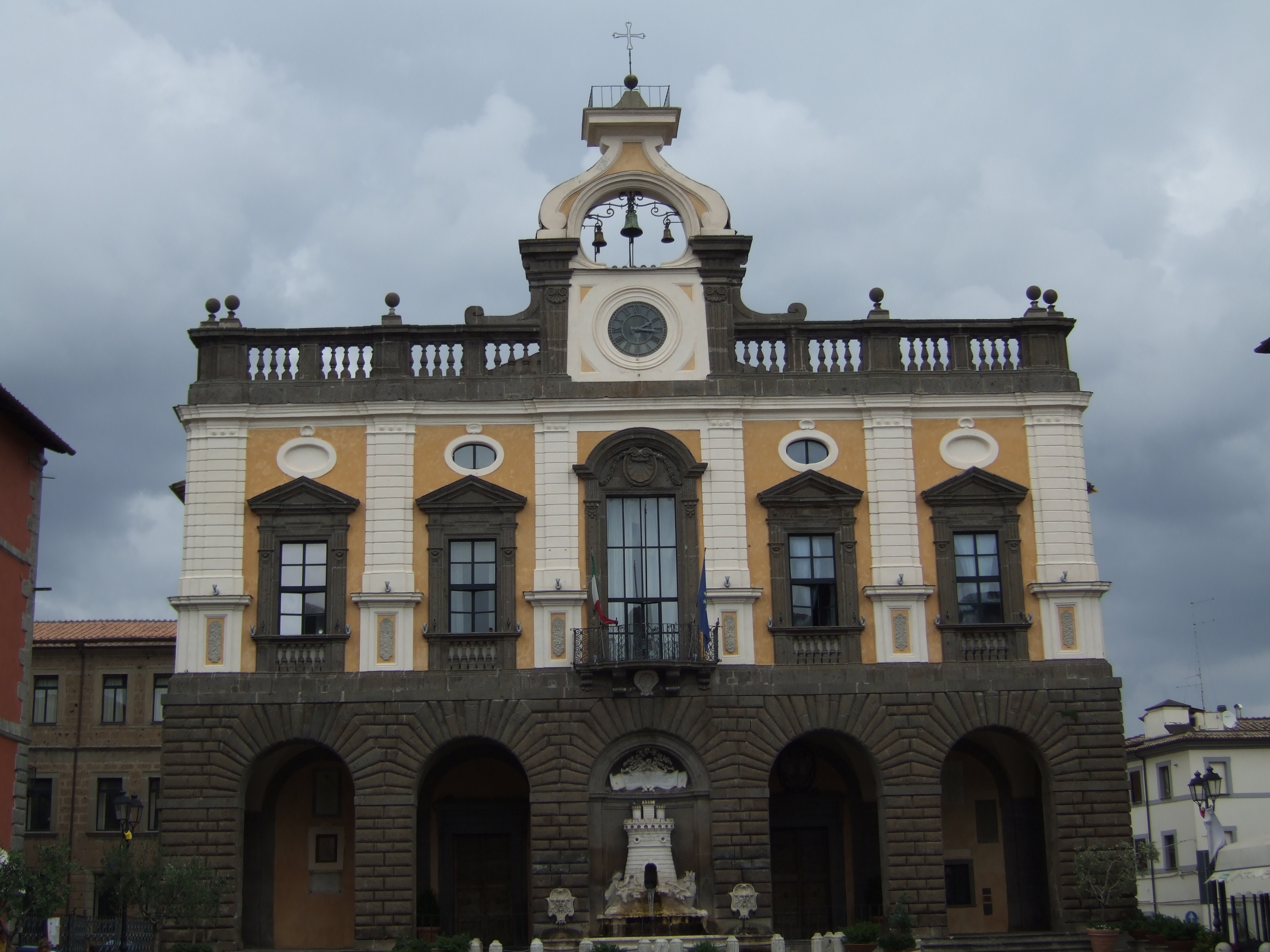
- Town Hall

- Location within Italy Location within Lazio
- Coordinates: 42°14′30″N 12°20′40″E
- Country: Italy
- Region: Lazio
- Province: Viterbo (VT)

Government
  - Mayor: Piero Soldatelli

Area
  - Total: 84 km^{2} (32 sq mi)
- Elevation: 227 m (745 ft)

Population (30 November 2017)
  - Total: 9,545
  - Density: 110/km^{2} (290/sq mi)
- Demonym: Nepesini
- Time zone: UTC+1 (CET)
  - Summer (DST): UTC+2 (CEST)
- Postal code: 01036
- Dialing code: 0761
- Patron saint: Sts. Ptolemy and Romanus
- Saint day: August 24
- Website: Official website

Nepi (anciently Nepet or Nepe or Nepete/Nepeta or Nepetos/Nepetus (Ancient Greek: Νέπετος)) is a town and comune in the province of Viterbo, Lazio, central Italy. The town lies 30 kilometres (19 mi) southeast of the city of Viterbo and about 13 kilometres (8 mi) southwest from Civita Castellana.

The town is known for its mineral springs, sold and bottled under the Acqua di Nepi brand throughout Italy.

== History ==
The region was already occupied in the 8th century BC; neighbouring Pizzo had been occupied in the Bronze Age. Nepet became Roman before 386 BC, when Livy speaks of it and Sutrium as the keys of Etruria. In that year it was surrendered to the Etruscans and recovered by the Romans, who beheaded the authors of its surrender. It became a colony in 383 BC. It was among the twelve Latin colonies that refused further help to Rome in 209 BC. After the Social War it became a municipium. It is hardly mentioned in Imperial times, except as a station on the road (Via Amerina) which diverged from the Via Cassia near the modern Settevene and ran to Amelia and Todi.

In the 8th century AD it was the seat of a duchy for a short while. During the late 9th to early 10th century, it was, along with much of central Italy, threatened by the Saracens.

Reported origin of the catnip plant (Nepeta cataria).

== Main sights ==
- Borgia Castle, a 15th-century reconstruction of a feudal manor. It has massive walls and four towers, one of which can be visited, and was once the property of Lucrezia Borgia.
- Cathedral of the Assunta, built in the 12th century over a pagan temple. It was rebuilt in 1831 after French troops set it on fire during the Napoleonic Wars. Of the ancient structure only the crypt remains, which includes a primitive pagan altar.
- Town hall, designed by Antonio da Sangallo the Younger in the 15th century, was finally completed in the 18th. The base was of stone, embellished by a porch, and the upper part had windows and a balcony with a bell-tower. Immediately in front is a fountain presumed to have been designed by Gian Lorenzo Bernini. Inside, an archaeological museum contains locally-found items.
- Santa Savinilla Catacombs (800 B.C.)
- San Pietro church
- San Rocco plague church

== Sources ==
- di Gennaro, F., Cerasuolo, O., Colonna, C., Rajala, U., Stoddart, S. K. F. and Whitehead, N. 2002. "Recent research on the city and territory of Nepi." Papers of the British School at Rome 70: 29–77.
- Edwards, C., Malone, C. A. T. and Stoddart, S. K. F. 1995. "Reconstructing a gateway city: the place of Nepi in the study of south-eastern Etruria. "In Christie, N. (ed), Settlement and economy in Italy. 1500 BC - AD 1500. Oxbow monograph 41. Oxford, Oxbow Books, pp. 431–440
