= Gortner =

Gortner is a surname. Notable people with the surname include:

- Christopher Willis Gortner (1964–2025), American novelist
- Marjoe Gortner (1944–2026), American evangelist preacher and actor
