= Giuseppe Ghedini =

Italian painter

Giuseppe Antonio Ghedini (1707 – 5 June 1791) was an Italian painter of the Baroque period, mainly active in Ferrara.

== Biography ==
He was born in Ficarolo in the province of Rovigo and had his artistic training with Giacomo Parolini. He became professor of painting at the Academy of Fine Arts of Ferrara.

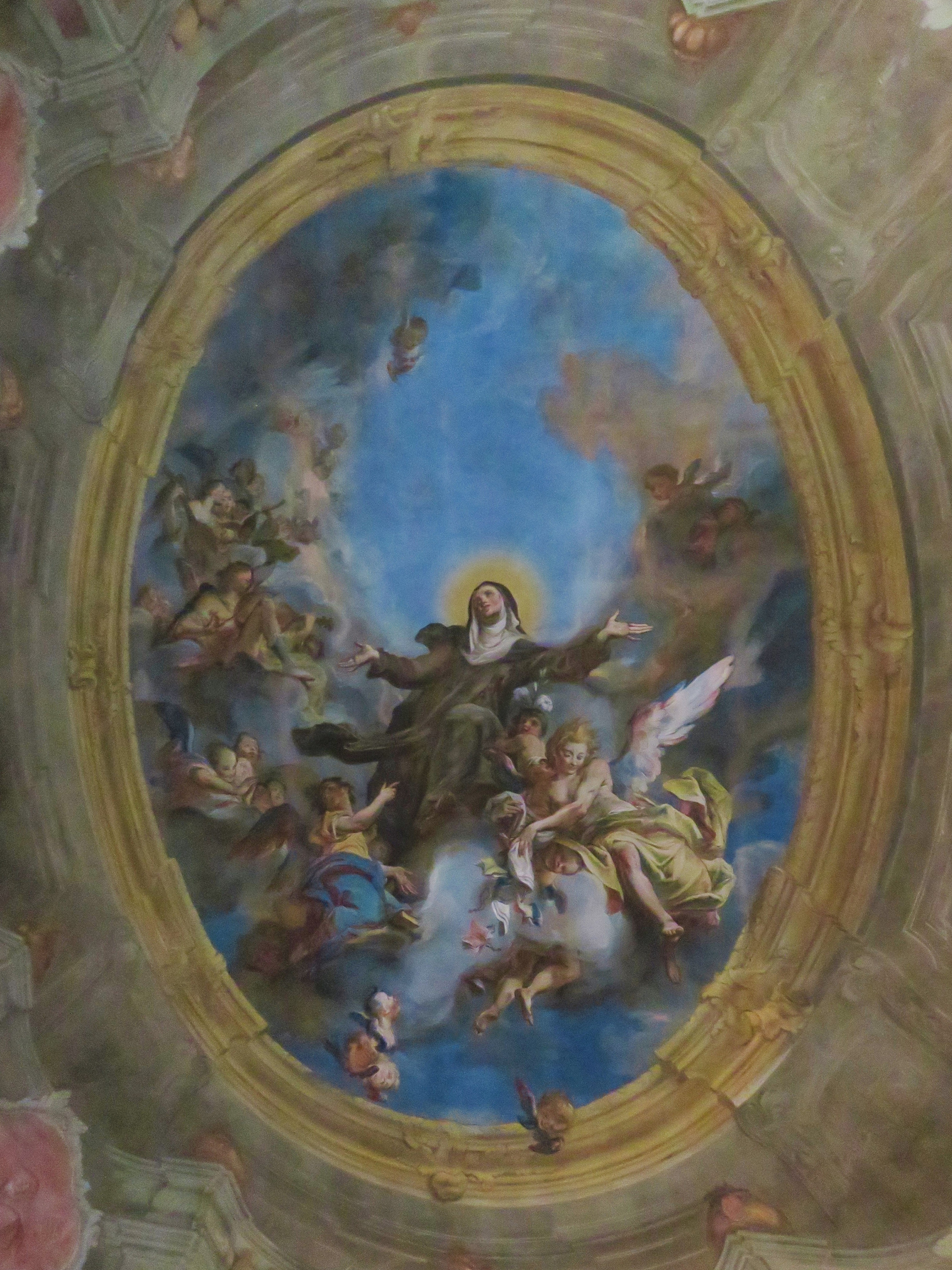
La gloria di Santa Caterina Vegri, Corpus Domini, Ferrara

Ghedini painted for the main church in Mirandola and the church in Vallalta. He painted a cycle of paintings about the Mysteries of the Rosary, once were around the altar dedicated to the Madonna del Rosario in the church of San Materno Vescovo in Melara. Ghedini's brother was a prelate in the town. These paintings are now found in Rovigo. Ghedini also painted two altarpieces destroyed in an 1851 fire at the church. He painted two altarpieces for Santa Maria in Vado: a Il mendico cacciato dal convitto di nozze and a Sacrifice of Melchisedec

He painted many portraits, including Girolamo Baruffaldi (Cento, 1736), Ferrante Borsetti, Pope Benedict XIV, and Bishop B. Barberini. Francesco Zucchi engraved many of his portraits. Ghedini helped illustrated the front page of an edition of Gerusalemme Liberata by Ricciardetto di N. Fortiguerri, also engraved by Zucchi.
