= Santa Maria in Vado, Ferrara =

Church building in Ferrara, Italy

Santa Maria in Vado
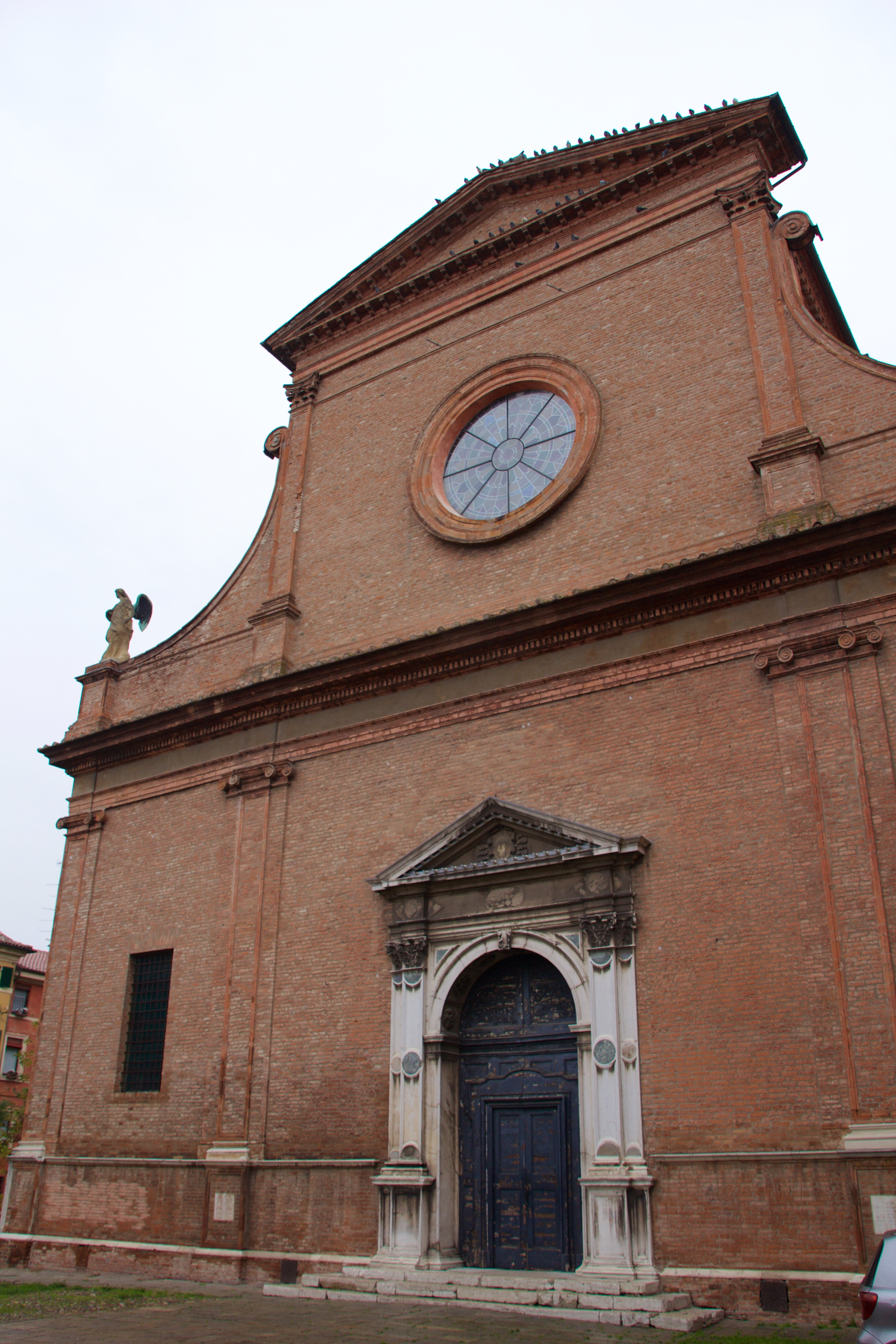
- Facade

Religion
- Affiliation: Roman Catholic
- Province: Ferrara

Location
- Location: Ferrara, Italy
- Interactive map of Santa Maria in Vado
- Coordinates: 44°49′49″N 11°37′40″E

Architecture
- Type: Church

Santa Maria in Vado is a church located on Via Borgovado number 3 in Ferrara, Region of Emilia-Romagna, Italy.

== History ==
The church derives its name from a guado or fording (vado in dialect) that was located nearby. A church at the site was documented since the tenth century, but on Easter of 1171, a eucharistic miracle occurred when blood spouted from the host during consecration. This made the church an object of pilgrimage. This miracle that appears to confirm transubstantiation resembles the subsequent events depicted in The Mass at Bolsena by Raphael.

Reconstruction was started in 1495 under the patronage of Ercole de' Roberti under the designs of Biagio Rossetti. The church contains paintings by Carlo Bononi, Camillo Filippi, Prospero Fontana, Giuseppe Antonio Ghedini, and Domenico Mona.

== Gallery ==
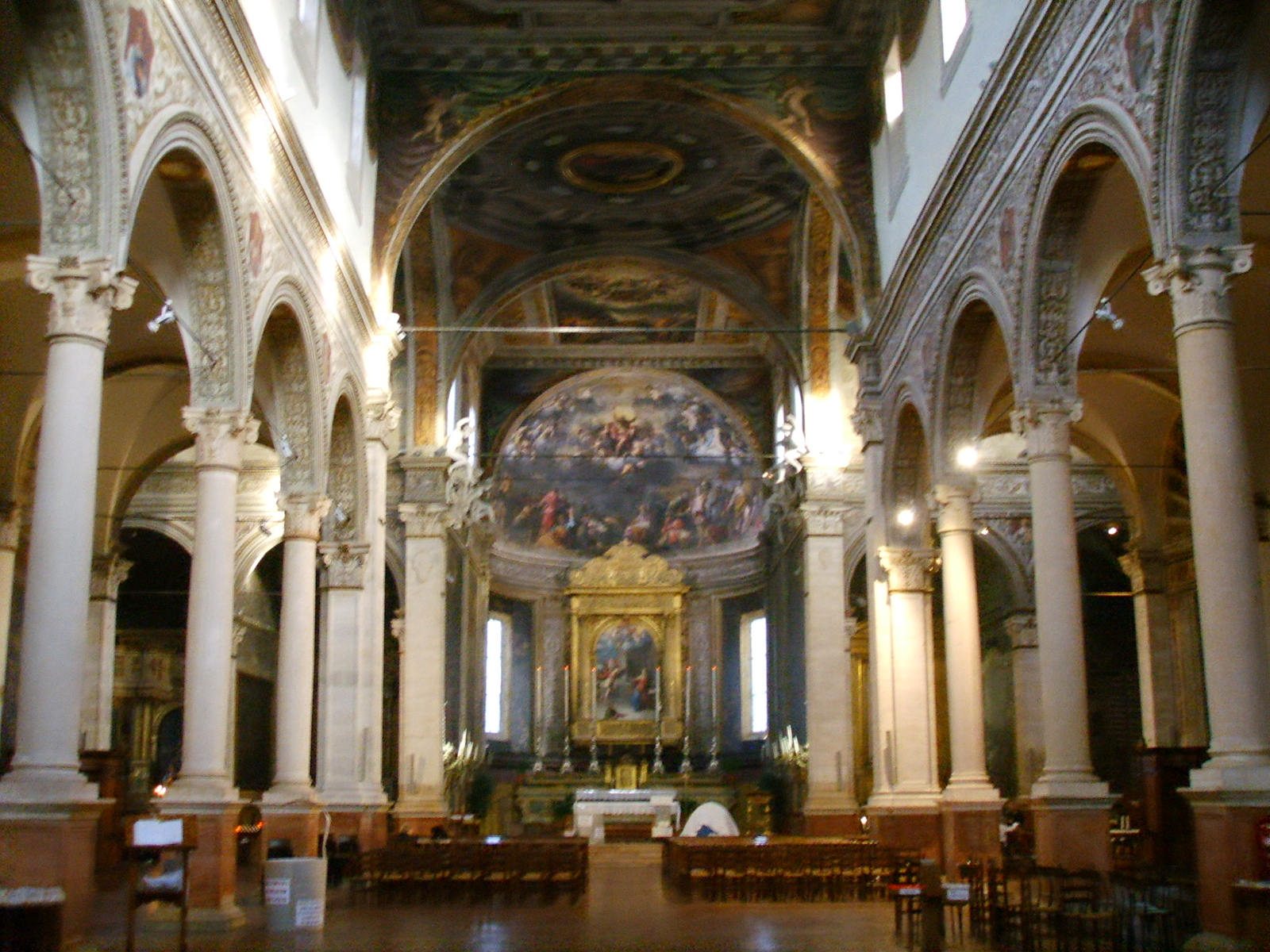
Interior

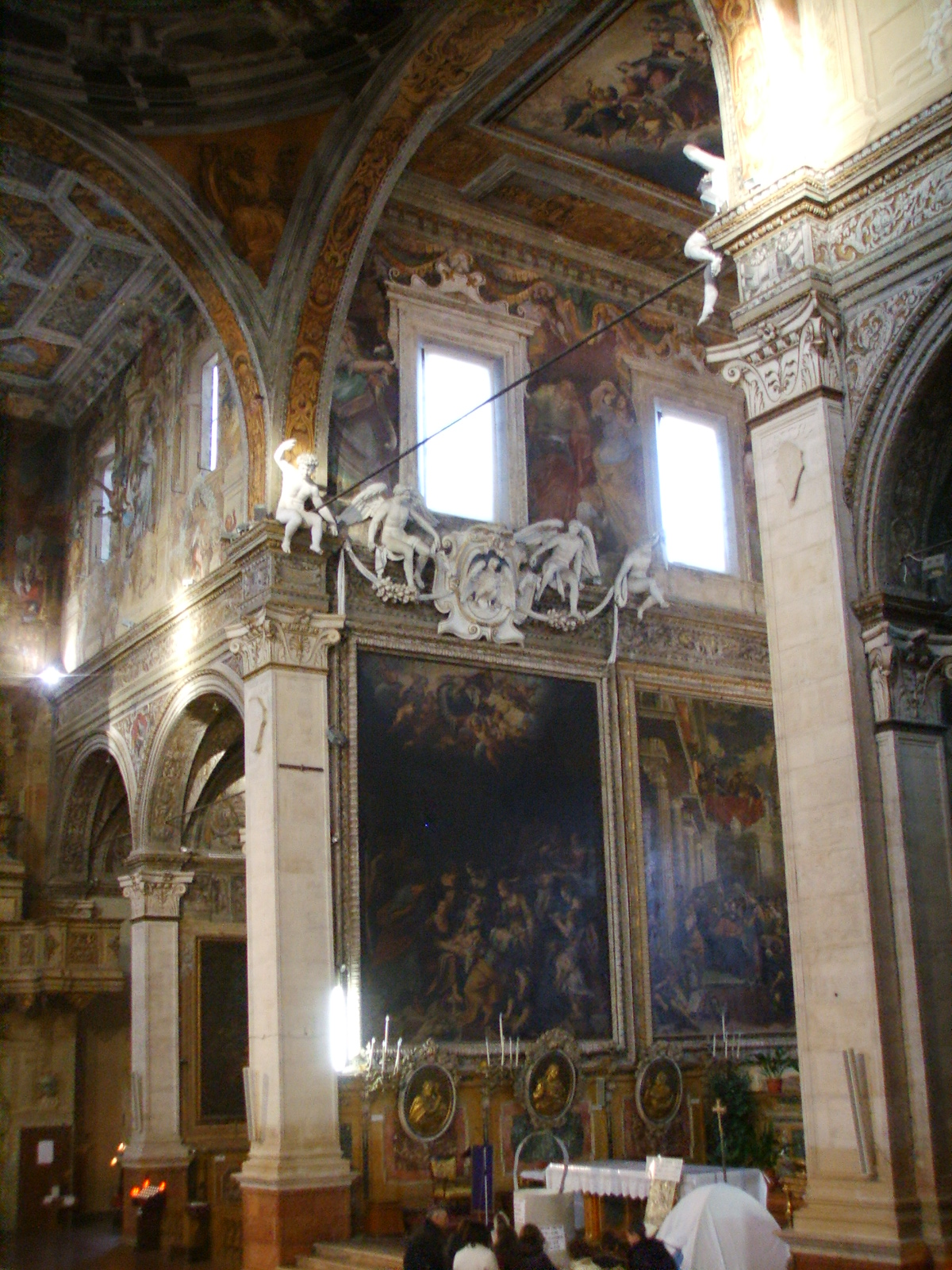
Main altar

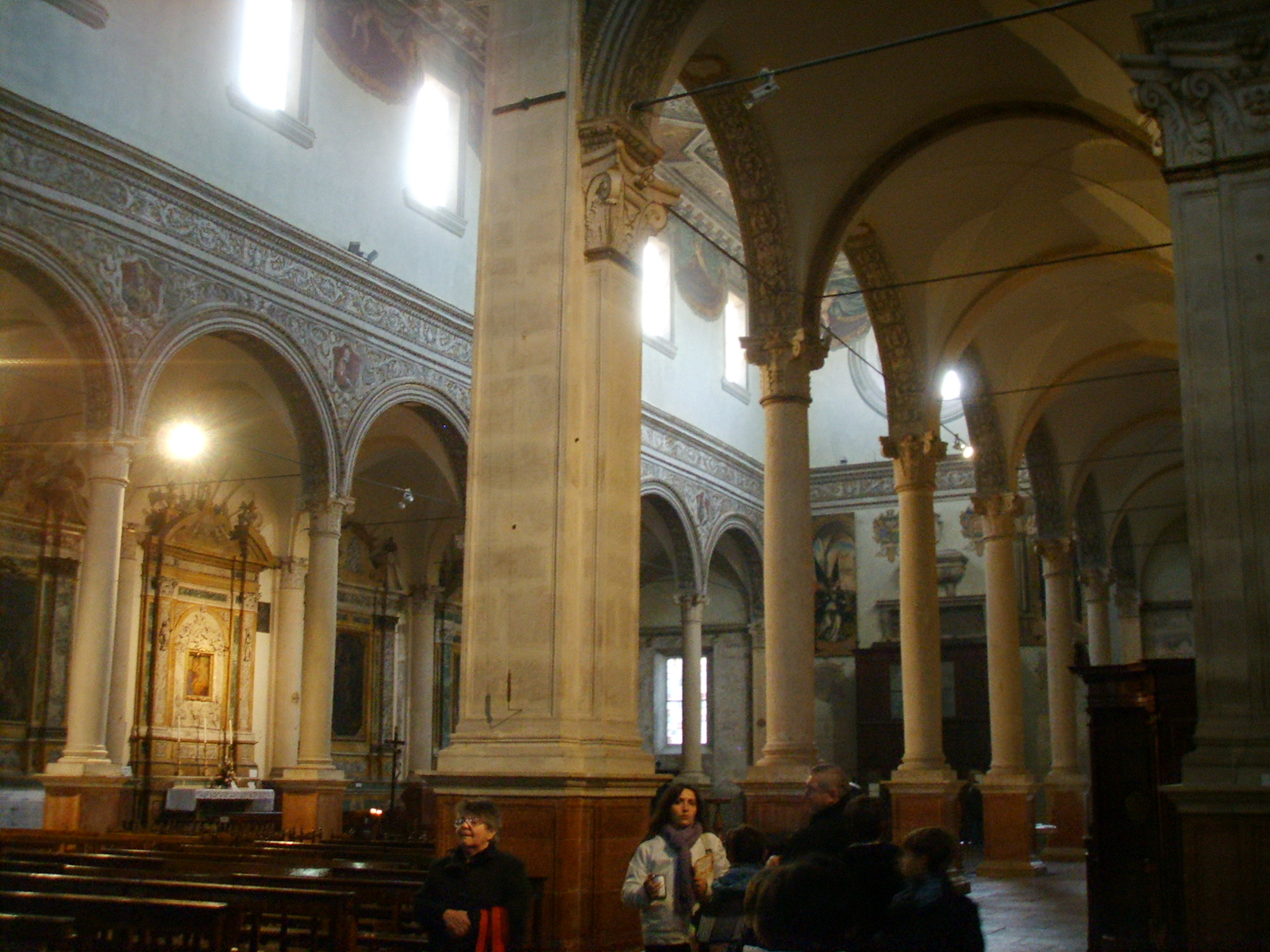
Nave

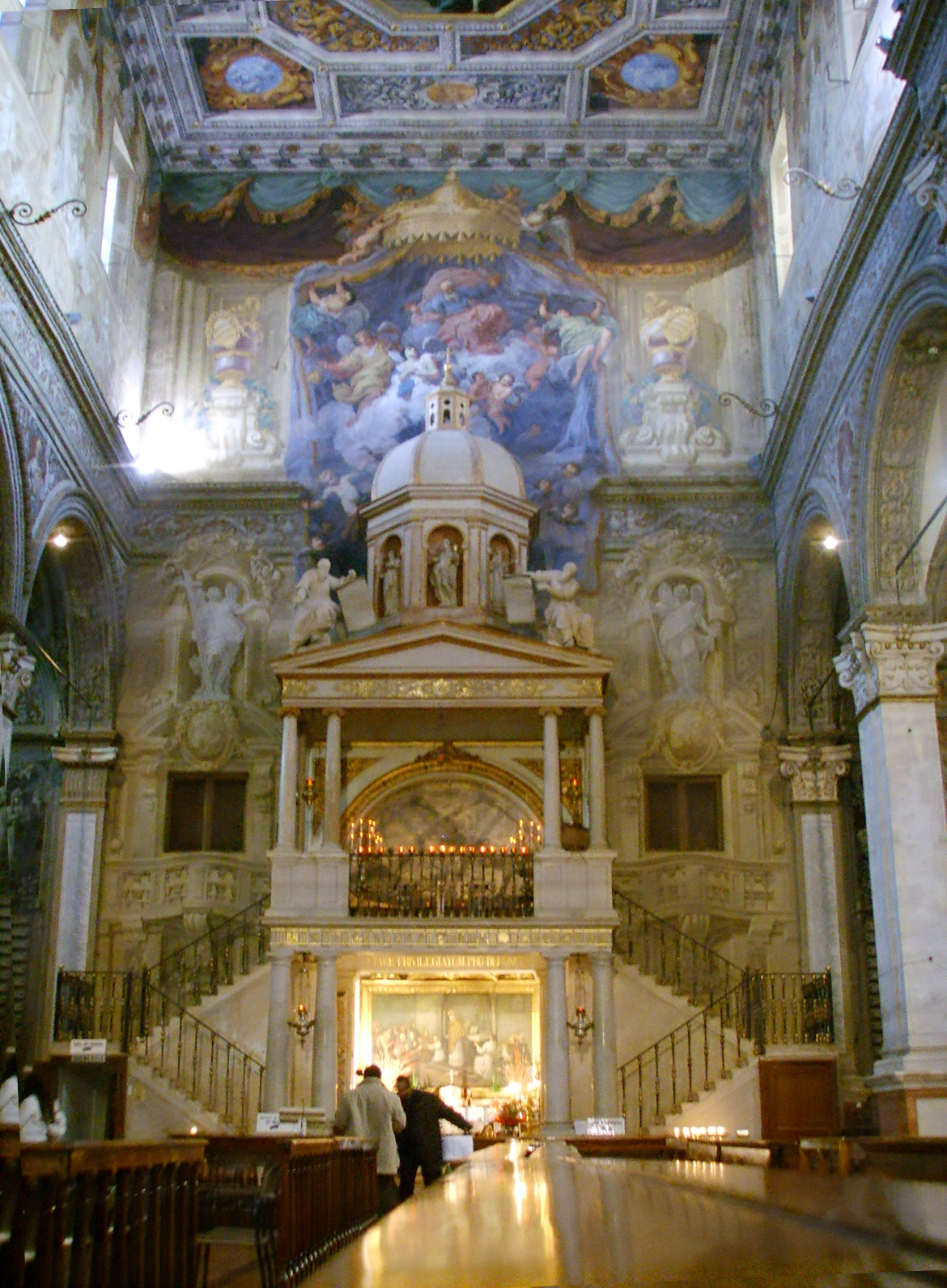
Sanctuary of the Holy Blood
