= Castello Borgia =

Castle in Viterbo, Italy

Coordinates: 42.2418°N 12.3456°E

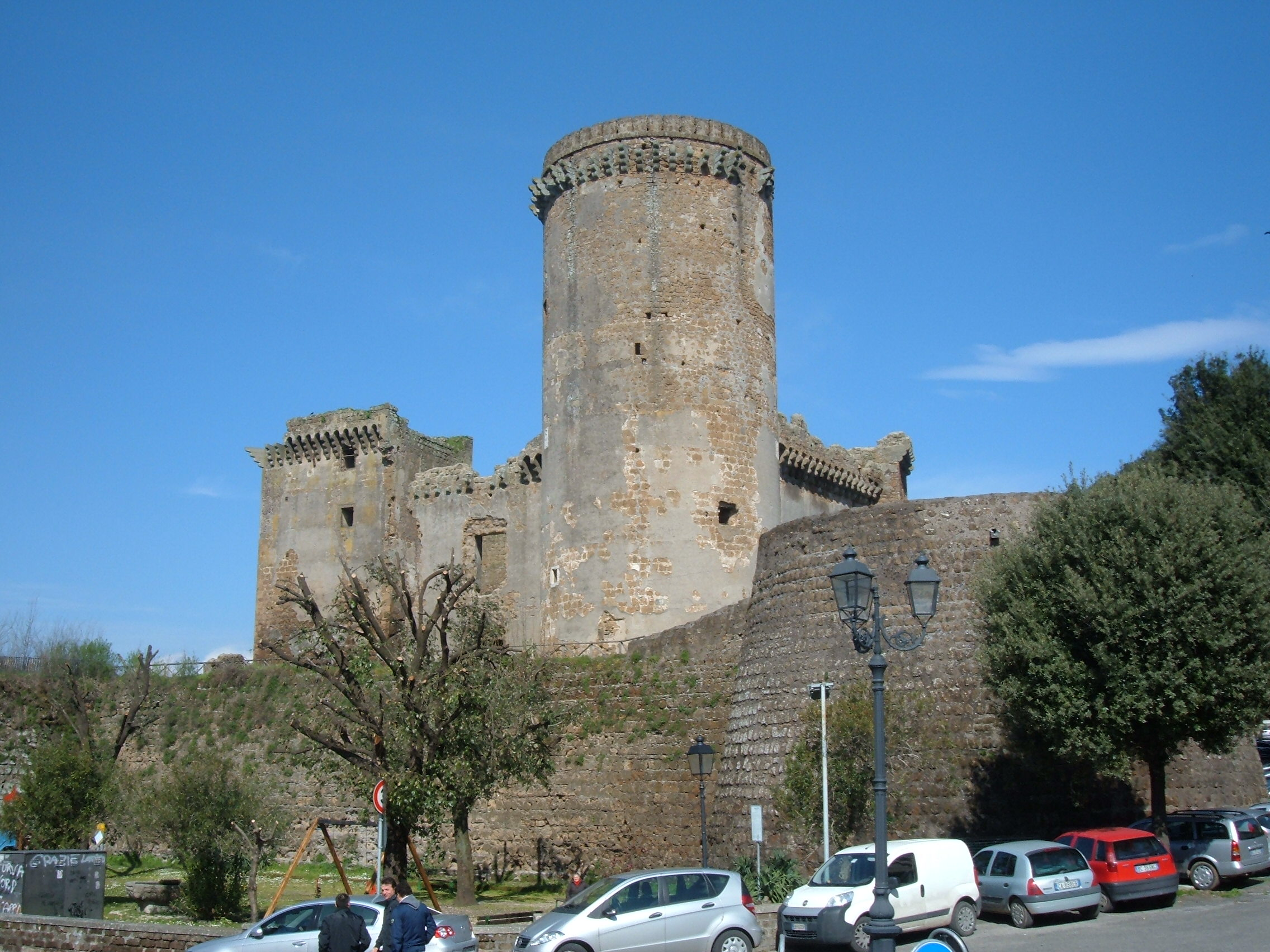
The Castello Borgia

The Castello Borgia (also Borgia Castle or Rocca di Nepi) is a 16th-century castle in Nepi, in province of Viterbo, Italy originally refurbished for Lucrezia Borgia. The castle features a large square piazza surrounded by walls on all sides and circular towers at each corner.

== History ==
The castle was originally constructed in the 12th century. During the 15th century it was expanded by cardinal Rodrigo Borgia (later Pope Alexander VI) and gifted to his daughter, Lucrezia. Borgia was Governor of Nepi at the time. The castle was further renovated by the Farnese during the 16th century.

It was damaged by the French in 1798 and left in a state of disrepair.

In 1819, the castle was the subject of a sketch by the travelling J. M. W. Turner. The sketch is now part of the permanent collection held by the Tate Britain.

== See also ==
- List of castles in Italy
