= San Rocco, Nepi =

Church in Lazio, Italy

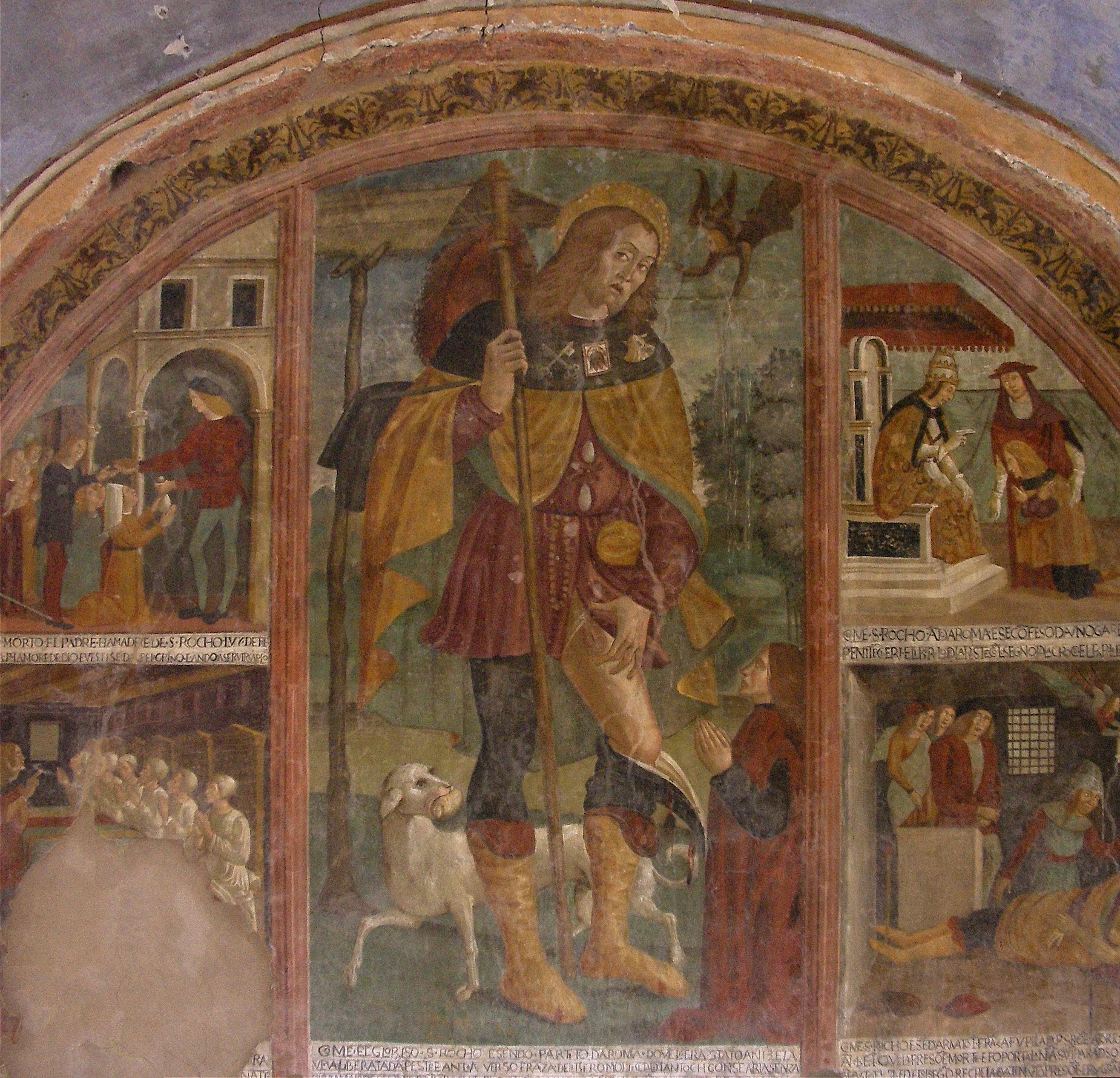
Fresco of St. Roch in San Rocco. St. Roch is the namesake of San Rocco.

San Rocco is a Renaissance-style, Roman Catholic church located in Nepi, province of Viterbo, region of Lazio, Italy.

The church was erected in 1467, after the bubonic plague epidemic afflicting the city, and the commune fulfilled a pledge to erect a Chapel to the Saint Roch. The church has 15th century paintings.
