= San Pietro, Nepi =

Church in the province of Viterbo, Italy

Coordinates: 42°14′30.2″N 12°20′52.7″E

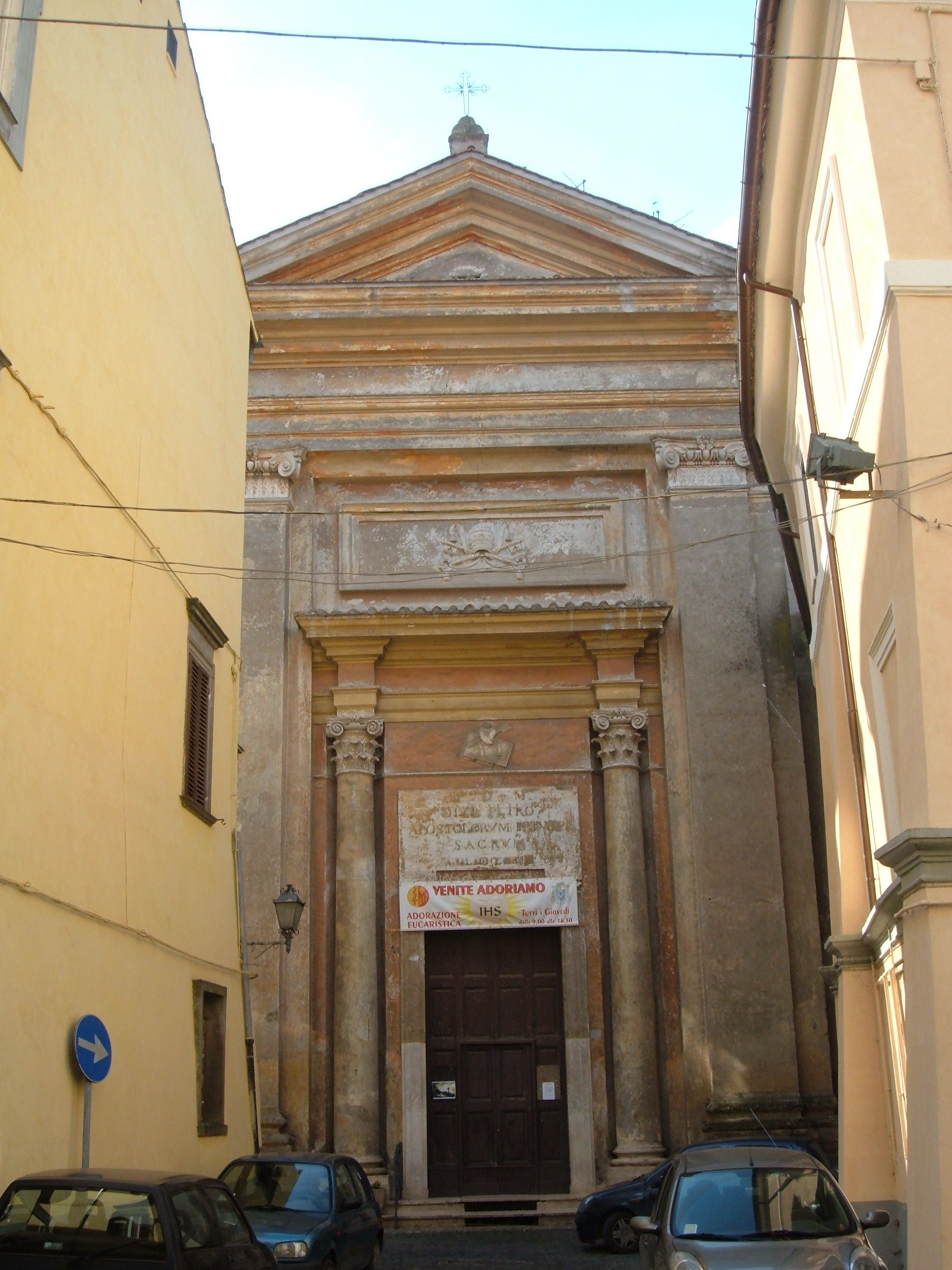
Nepi - San Pietro 1.JPG

San Pietro is a Neoclassical-style, Roman Catholic church located in Nepi, province of Viterbo, region of Lazio, Italy. A church likely stood here by the 13th century. A new building was consecrated in 1465 and officiated by the Augustinian order. However, in the 18th century, the town underwent a renewed urban plan, and the axis of the church was changed from east–west to north–south. Work on refurbishment began in 1755, and led to the present elliptical layout. The interior has a rich stucco decoration.
