= Nepi Cathedral =

Church in Nepi, Italy

Coordinates: 42.2424°N 12.3470°E

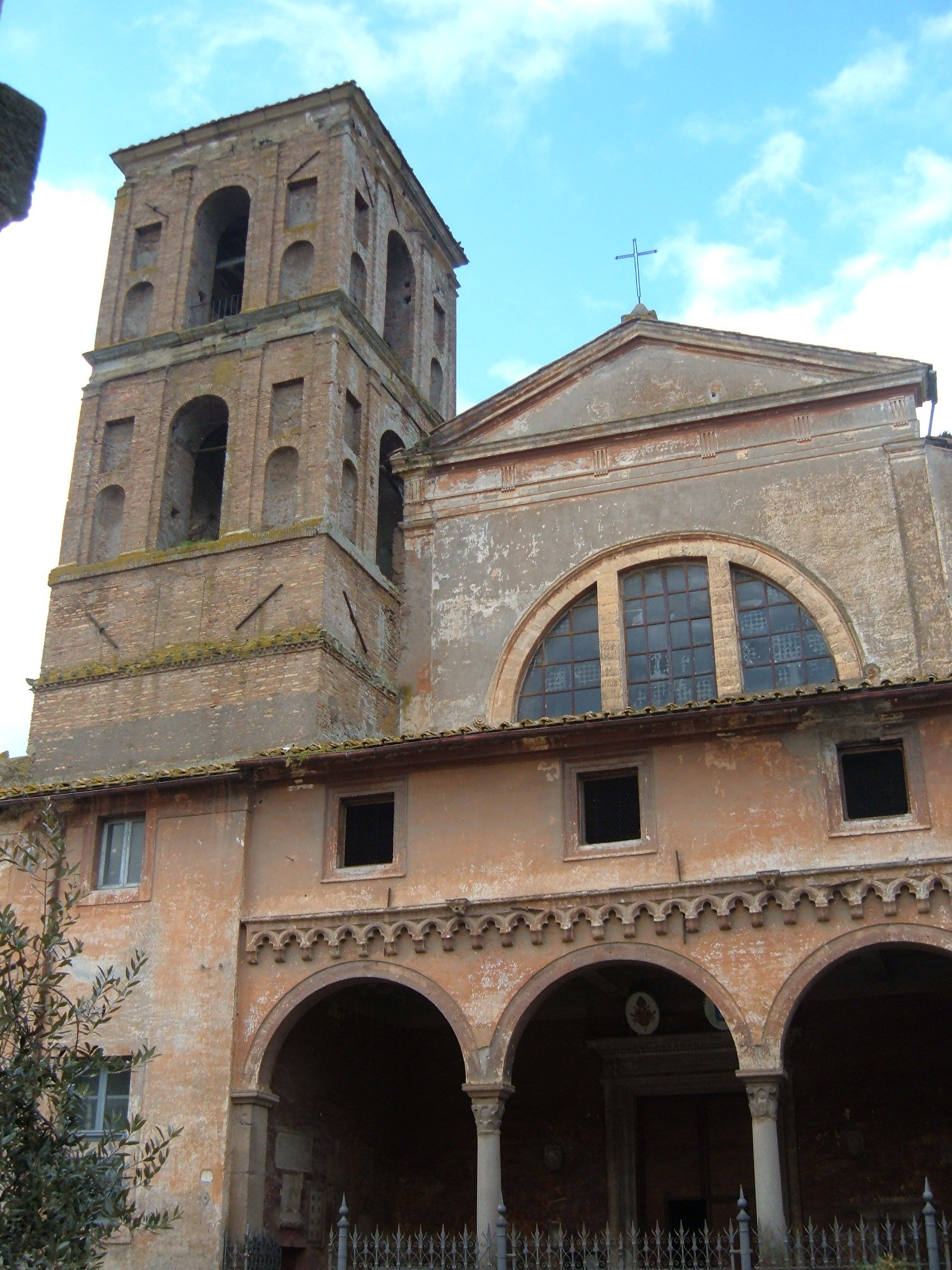
West front of the cathedral

Nepi Cathedral (Italian: Duomo di Nepi; Basilica Concattedrale di Santa Maria Assunta e Sant'Anastasia) is a Neoclassical Roman Catholic cathedral located in Nepi, region of Lazio, Italy. It is dedicated to the Assumption of the Virgin Mary and to Saint Anastasia. It was the episcopal seat of the Diocese of Nepi, later Nepi and Sutri, suppressed in 1986, and is now a co-cathedral in the Diocese of Civita Castellana.

A church was built on the site in the 5th century, but was destroyed during the Lombard invasion. A larger church was finally erected in the 12th century. This Romanesque edifice was burned by the French forces in 1798. Of the previous building only the crypt remains. The cathedral was rebuilt between 1818 and 1840.
