= Rodrigo of Aragon =

Italian noble

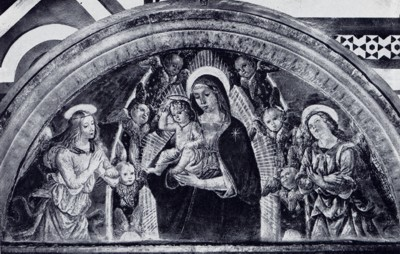
- Lucrezia Borgia (left) with Rodrigo (on the right next to her) and Alfonso of Aragon (to the very right), 1500

Duke of Bisceglie and Sermoneta
- Born: 1 November 1499; Rome, Papal States
- Died: August 1512 (aged 12); Bari, Kingdom of Naples
- Noble family: Trastámara
- Father: Alfonso of Aragon
- Mother: Lucrezia Borgia

Rodrigo of Aragon (also called Little Rodrigo, 1 November 1499 – August 1512), Duke of Bisceglie and Sermoneta of the House of Trastámara, was the only child of Lucrezia Borgia, daughter of Pope Alexander VI, and her second husband Alfonso of Aragon, son of Alfonso II of Naples.

== Biography ==
Rodrigo was born in Rome in 1499 on the night between 31 October and 1 November. He was baptized Rodrigo after Lucrezia's father on 11 November, in the presence of many cardinals, ambassadors and prelates from all over Italy. His godfather was Francesco Borgia, Archbishop of Cosenza, while Cardinal Carafa of Naples performed the rite in the Sistine Chapel. The child was very quiet, but as soon as he was in Orsini's arms, long time enemies of the House of Borgia suddenly reconciled, Rodrigo began to cry and would not stop until he was given back to his mother. For many, this incident meant bad luck.

After the murder of Rodrigo's father Alfonso of Aragon in 1500, Lucrezia was obliged to abandon her son in order to marry Alfonso I d'Este, Duke of Ferrara. In September 1501, Rodrigo was entrusted to Francesco Borgia. Lucrezia left Rome on 6 January 1502 and never saw Rodrigo again. While in Rome, Rodrigo inherited from his father the Dukedom of Bisceglie and all his properties; from the Pope he got the title of Duke of Sermoneta, medals were coined with his name and titles. After Alexander VI's death in 1503, the enemies of the Pope locked Rodrigo in Castel Sant'Angelo with the rest of the Borgia family. Lucrezia arranged a discharge of their children by correspondences and alliances and requested that Rodrigo be raised by the family of Alfonso of Aragon.

Rodrigo lived with his father's sister Sancha of Aragon until her death in 1506, then he grew up with Isabella of Naples, Duchess of Bari. Lucrezia had tried many times to have little Rodrigo in Ferrara but her plans were ruined. She sent him gifts and letters and, when he was 9 years old, an educator from the University of Ferrara. In 1506 Lucrezia arranged a meeting at the Basilica della Santa Casa in Loreto but it never happened. In August 1512, Rodrigo died aged 12 in Bari from illness. After his death, Lucrezia was allowed to go to Bisceglie in order to liquidate his assets and dispose of his court. She attended a memorial service and then returned to the Convent of Saint Bernardino where she grieved for a month. Only in 1518, a year before Lucrezia's death, did she receive Rodrigo's inheritance.
