= Corpus Domini, Ferrara =

Monastery in Emilia-Romagna, Italy

Coordinates: 44.8323°N 11.6267°E

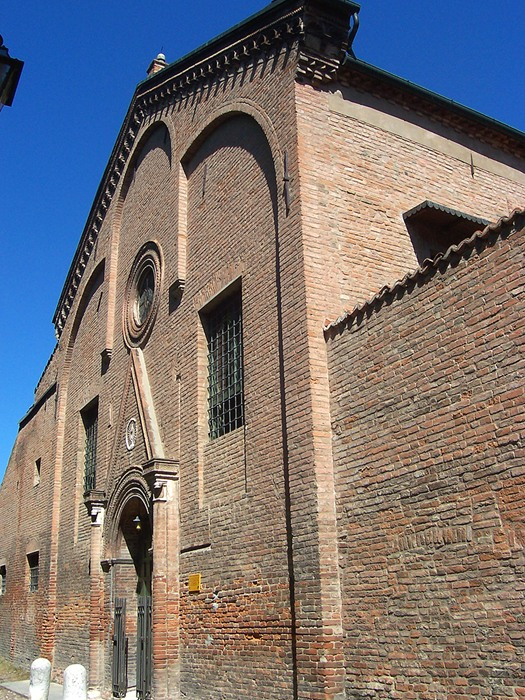
Facade of Church

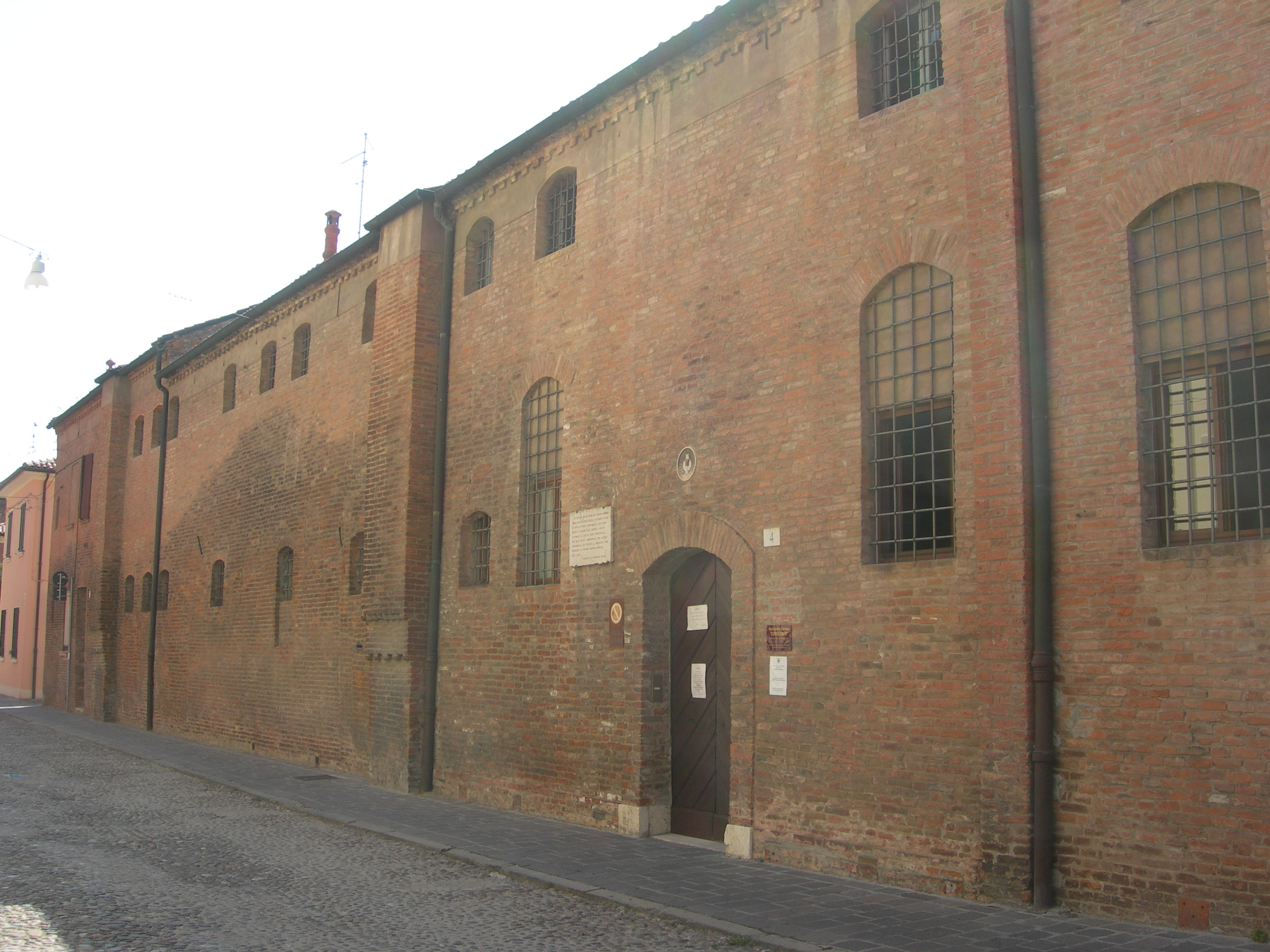
Facade of the monastery

The Monastery of Corpus Domini is a Roman Catholic monastery situated at 4 via Pergolato in Ferrara. It first was founded as a house of penitent women, and became an Order of Poor Clares Observant Franciscan convent in 1431.

The convent was the home of Saint Catherine of Bologna (Born as Caterina di Vigri) from 1431 to 1456. She served as the Mother Superior, mistress of novices, teaching about 100 women to become pious nuns. She was also an artist who illuminated her own breviary and is said to have decorated the walls of the convent with images of the Christ Child. These were lost or destroyed in a fire in 1667. The public church was redecorated in the late-Baroque period. On its high altar is Communion of the Apostles by Giambettino Cignaroli (1768), whilst the church's ceiling fresco Glory of Saint Catherina Vegri is by Giuseppe Ghedini (1770–1773).

The house still remains an active monastery; a community of Franciscan nuns, called Poor Clares after Saint Clare their founder and companion to Saint Francis of Assisi. One of their abbesses was the daughter of Lucrezia Borgia, Leonara d'Este, now recognised as one of the earliest writers of polyphonic choral music for women.

== Notable burials ==
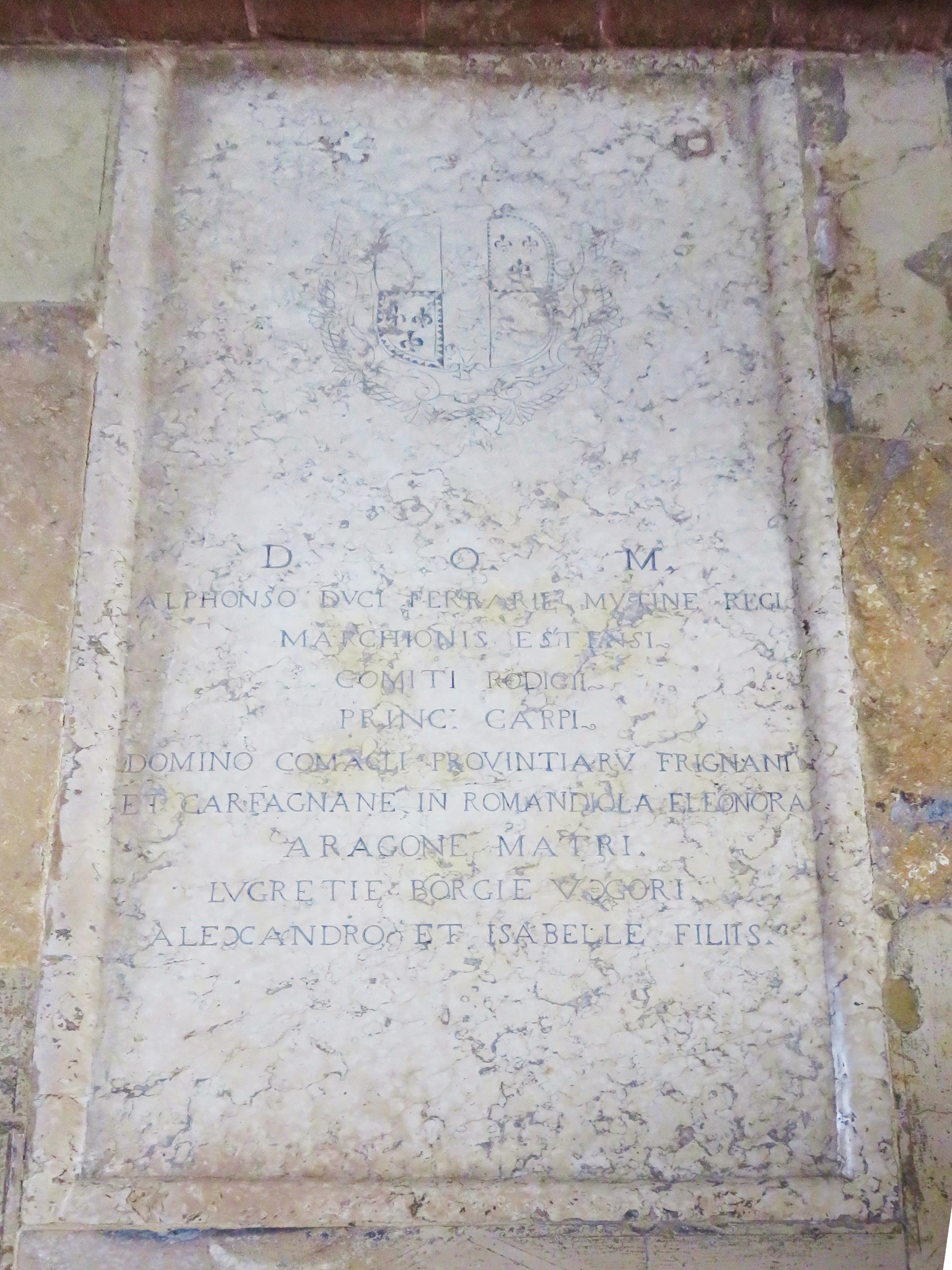
Tombstone of Alfonso I, Lucrezia Borgia and some of their children.

The church is the burial-place for several members of the House of Este:

- Leonello d'Este
- Eleanor of Naples
- Niccolò III d'Este
- Ricciarda, Marchioness of Saluzzo
- Ercole I d'Este
- Sigismondo d'Este
- Alfonso I d'Este, Duke of Ferrara
- Giulio d'Este
- Ferrante d'Este
- Ercole II d'Este
- Eleonora d'Este
- Lucrezia Borgia
- Lucrezia de' Medici
- Alfonso II d'Este
