= Eleonora d'Este (1515–1575) =

Ferrarese noblewoman (1515–1575)

Eleonora d'Este (4 July 1515 – 1575) was a Ferrarese noblewoman. She was the first daughter of Alfonso I d'Este, Duke of Ferrara and his second wife Lucrezia Borgia – as his first daughter, Alfonso named her after his mother Eleanor of Naples.

== Life ==
Eleonora was born on July 3,1515, at Castel Vecchio.

Due to the fear that she would die,immediately after her birth she was baptized with the names Elonora Barbara. Her god-mother was one of her mother's ladies in waiting Cassandra Colleoni, the widow of Niccolo II da Correggio,who were one of Eleonoras second cousins.

She was brought up in Ferrara and her mother died in childbed when she was four years old, after which Eleonora was entrusted into the care of the Corpus domini monastery. Her father had two more children with Laura Dianti.Eleonora was the only one of Alfonso and Lucrezia's daughters to survive both their parents.

From a young age she received instruction in natural sciences, in music and was taught Latin and Greek.

She became a Poor Clare nun at the Corpus Domini Monastery and became abbess when she was eighteen.

She helped raise her brother Ercole's illegitemate daughter Lucrezia(d. 1572), born from his relationship with Diana Trotti.

== Death ==
Upon her death in 1575, Eleonora was buried in the monastery alongside her mother and other members of her family.

== Musica quinque vocum motetta materna lingua vocata ==
In 1543, Girolamo Scotto of Venice published a collection of 43 religious motets under the title Musica quinque vocum motetta materna lingua vocata. There is no indication in that publication as to who the composer might have been.

Laurie Stras, professor of music at Southampton University, has argued that Leonora may have been the composer. Leonora was triply disqualified from being named in those days: being a woman, and a princess, and a nun.

== Sources ==
- http://viaf.org/viaf/95313383
- Sarah Bradford: Lucrezia Borgia. Mondadori Editore, Milan (2005), (ISBN 88-04-55627-7)
