= Lucrezia Borgia =

Italian noblewoman (1480–1519)

- Duchess of Bisceglie; Princess of Salerno; Countess of Cotignola
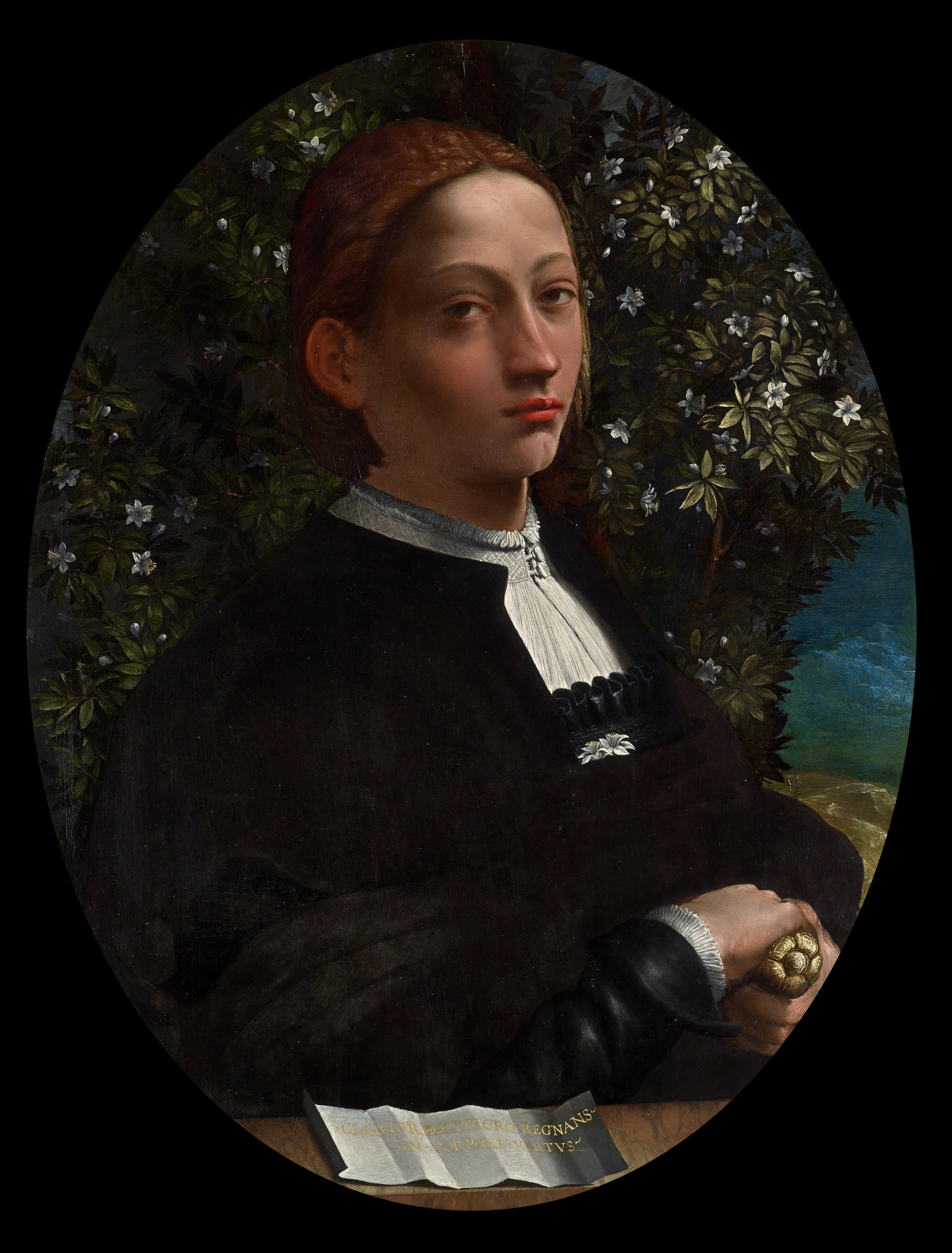
- Portrait by Dosso Dossi which is purported to depict Lucrezia, c. 1518

Duchess consort of Ferrara, Modena, and Reggio
- Tenure: 25 January 1505 – 24 June 1519

Lady consort of Pesaro and Gradara
- Tenure: 12 June 1493 – 20 December 1497
- Born: 18 April 1480; Subiaco, Papal States
- Died: 24 June 1519 (aged 39); Belriguardo Castle, Ferrara, Duchy of Ferrara
- Burial: Convent of Corpus Domini, Ferrara
- Spouse: Giovanni Sforza (m. 1493; ann. 1497) Alfonso of Aragon (m. 1498; died 1500) Alfonso d'Este (m. 1501)
- Issue Detail: Rodrigo of Aragon; Ercole II d'Este, Duke of Ferrara; Ippolito d'Este; Eleonora d'Este; Francesco d'Este, Marquis of Massalombarda
- House: Borgia
- Father: Pope Alexander VI
- Mother: Vannozza dei Cattanei
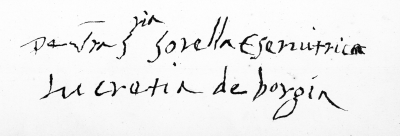
- Signature

Lucrezia Borgia (Note: Italian: [luˈkrɛttsja ˈbɔrdʒa]; Valencian: Lucrècia Borja [luˈkrɛsia ˈbɔɾdʒa, -dʒɔ]; Spanish: Lucrecia de Borja [luˈkɾeθja ðe ˈβoɾxa].) (18 April 1480 – 24 June 1519) was an Italian-Spanish noblewoman of the House of Borgia who was the illegitimate daughter of Pope Alexander VI and Vannozza dei Cattanei. She was a former governor of Spoleto.

Her family arranged several marriages for her that advanced their own political position, including to Giovanni Sforza, Lord of Pesaro and Gradara, Count of Cotignola; Alfonso of Aragon, Duke of Bisceglie and Prince of Salerno; and Alfonso I d'Este, Duke of Ferrara. Alfonso of Aragon was an illegitimate son of the King of Naples, and tradition has it that Lucrezia's brother Cesare may have had him murdered after his political value waned.

Notorious tales about her family have cast Lucrezia as a femme fatale, a controversial role in which she has been portrayed in many artworks, novels, and films.

== Early life ==
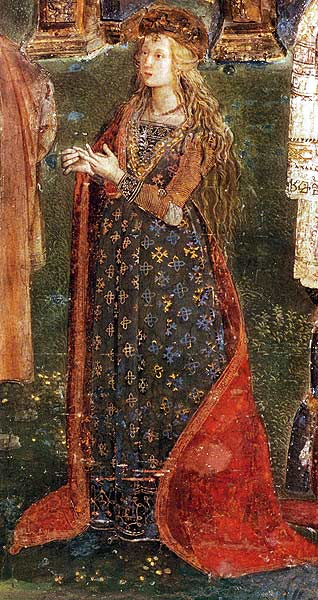
Purported portrait of Lucrezia as Saint Catherine of Alexandria in a fresco by Pinturicchio. The "Hall of the Saints" within the Borgia Apartments in the Vatican, c. 1494

Lucrezia Borgia was born on 18 April 1480 at Subiaco, a town near Rome. Her mother was Vannozza dei Cattanei, a mistress of her father, Cardinal Rodrigo de Borgia (later Pope Alexander VI). She had three full siblings: Cesare Borgia, Giovanni Borgia, and Gioffre Borgia, although Gioffre's paternity was later contested. Lucrezia's father acknowledged her as his child, and consulted an astrologer after her birth, who foretold a remarkable future. During her early life, Lucrezia's education was entrusted to Carlo Canale and then to Adriana Orsini de Milan. Orsini was a confidant of Lucrezia's father and was his first cousin.

Lucrezia's education primarily took place in the Palazzo Pizzo de Merlo, a building adjacent to her father's residence. Unlike most educated women of her time, for whom convents were the primary source of knowledge, Lucrezia's humanist education came from the sphere of intellectuals in the court and close relatives, and included a solid grounding in the Humanities, which the Catholic Church was reviving at the time. She was fluent in Spanish, Valenciano, Italian, and French and literate in both Latin and Greek. She also became proficient in poetry and oration, and could play the lute and zither, embroider and dance. The biggest testament to her intelligence is her ability in administration, as later on in life she took care of Vatican City correspondence and governance of Ferrara.

== List of marriages ==
=== First marriage: Giovanni Sforza (Lord of Pesaro and Gradara) ===
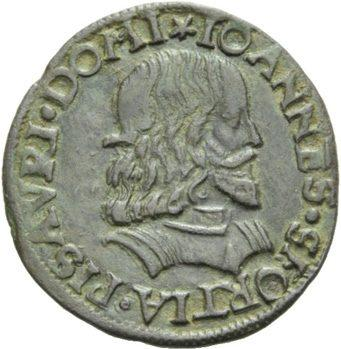
Coin showing Giovanni Sforza

On 26 February 1491, a matrimonial arrangement was drawn up between Lucrezia and the Lord of Val D'Ayora in the Kingdom of Valencia, Don Cherubino Joan de Centelles (d. 1522). The arrangement was annulled less than two months later in favour of a new contract engaging Lucrezia to Don Gaspare, Count of Aversa (1476–1534).

When Lucrezia's father Rodrigo became Pope Alexander VI in August 1492, he sought to be allied with powerful, princely families and founding dynasties of Italy. Therefore, he called off Lucrezia's previous engagements. Cardinal Ascanio Sforza said: "There are many who long to marry into the Pope's family via his daughter, and he lets many think they have a chance. Even the king of Naples aspires to win her hand!"

The Pope arranged for Lucrezia to marry condottiero Giovanni Sforza, a member of the House of Sforza who was the Lord of Pesaro and titled Count of Catignola. Giovanni was the nephew of the Duke of Milan as an illegitimate son of Costanzo I Sforza. He was a Sforza of the second rank and belonged to a cadet branch of the family. They married by proxy on 12 June 1493 in Rome, when Lucrezia was aged 13. She was outfitted in brocade and jewels for the wedding ceremony.

On 31 May 1494, Lucrezia departed from Rome with a retinue of ladies and gentlemen and accompanied by Giulia Farnese and Adriana Mila. She moved to her husband's palace in Pesaro, where local poets celebrated her with their madrigals, she negotiated the marriage of one of her Spanish ladies-in-waiting, and she exchanged visits with the highly literate court of the Dukes of Urbino.

Before long, the Borgia family no longer needed the Sforzas, and the Pope may have covertly ordered the execution of Giovanni Sforza. Lucrezia was likely informed of this by her brother, Cesare, and she warned her husband, who then fled from Rome.

Alexander asked Giovanni's uncle, Cardinal Ascanio Sforza, to persuade Giovanni to agree to an annulment of the marriage. Giovanni refused and accused Lucrezia of paternal incest, spreading the rumour that the pope wanted his daughter to return to Rome so that he could have sex with her. This rumour endured through the centuries, partly due to the writings of Florentine historian Francesco Guicciardini and verses by Giovanni Pontano and Jacopo Sannazaro, and Lucrezia's reputation was tainted. The pope, however, asserted that his daughter's marriage had not been consummated and was, thus, invalid. Giovanni was offered her dowry in return for his cooperation. The Sforza family threatened to withdraw their protection, should he refuse. Giovanni finally signed confessions of impotence and documents of annulment before witnesses, despite how his first wife had died in childbirth.

=== Purported affair with Pedro Calderon ===
Historians have speculated that during the prolonged process of the annulment, Lucrezia consummated a relationship with someone, perhaps Alexander's chamberlain Pedro Calderon (sometimes called Perotto). In any case, families hostile to the Borgias would later accuse her of being pregnant at the time her marriage was annulled. She is known to have retired to the cloistered Convent of Saint Sixtus Vecchio in Rome where she was given sanctuary by the Mother Superior in June 1497, to await the outcome of the annulment proceedings, which were finalized in December of the same year. In the convent, in mid-June, she received news of the murder of her brother Giovanni, whose killer was never officially discovered.

The bodies of Pedro Calderon and a maid, Pantasilea, were found in the Tiber river in February 1498. In March 1498, the Ferrarese ambassador claimed that Lucrezia had given birth, but this was denied by other sources. However, a child was born in the Borgia household the year before Lucrezia's marriage to Alfonso of Aragon. He was named Giovanni but is known to historians as the "Infans Romanus” (Child of Rome).

In 1501, two papal bulls were issued concerning Giovanni Borgia. In the first, he was recognized as Cesare's child from an affair, before his marriage. The second contradictory bull recognized him as the son of Pope Alexander VI. Lucrezia's name is not mentioned in either, and rumors that she was his mother have never been proven. The second bull was kept secret for many years, and Giovanni was assumed to be Cesare's son. This is supported by the fact that he became Duke of Camerino in 1502, which was to be inherited by the Duke of Romagna's oldest son. After Alexander's death, Giovanni went to stay with Lucrezia in Ferrara, where he was accepted as her half-brother.

=== Second marriage: Alfonso d'Aragon (Duke of Bisceglie and Prince of Salerno) ===
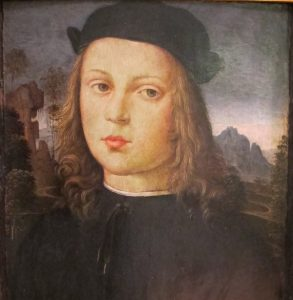
Duke Alfonso of Aragon depicted in a painting by Pinturicchio

Despite the scandal of the annulment of her marriage to Giovanni Sforza, Lucrezia was married for a second time to the Neapolitan Alfonso of Aragon, Duke of Bisceglie and Prince of Salerno of the House of Trastámara. He was the illegitimate son of Alfonso II King of Naples and his mistress Trogia Gazzella. Alfonso was also the half-brother of Sancha of Aragon, Princess of Squillace and wife of Lucrezia's younger brother Gioffre Borgia.

Lucrezia's father gave the Duchy of Spoleto and 40,000 ducats as her dowry. It was also part of the agreement that the couple would remain in Rome for at least one year and not be forced to live permanently at the Kingdom of Naples until her father's death. Lucrezia's marriage was a short one.

Lucrezia and Alfonso were married on 21 July 1498 in the Vatican, with the celebrations being held behind closed doors in the Borgia apartments. Lucrezia became the Duchess consort of Bisceglie and Princess consort of Salerno and the marriage was said to be happy, with Lucrezia supporting her husband in a dispute with her father on the legality of the marriage of Alfonso's aunt Beatrice of Naples to Vladislaus II, King of Bohemia and Hungary.

In 1499 Lucrezia was appointed as Governor of Spoleto, a role usually reserved solely for cardinals, becoming the first female governor in the Papal States in a territory crucial for the passage from the Tyrrhenian to the Adriatic Sea. She also reportedly lost her first baby with Alfonso in February 1499.

Alfonso fled Rome for Naples shortly afterwards due to the changing alliances of the Borgias, while Lucrezia was again pregnant. His flight incensed the Pope, who sent troops after him but failed to find him. He returned to Rome at Lucrezia's request only to be murdered on 15 July 1500. At the top of the steps before the entrance to St. Peter's Basilica, Alfonso was attacked by three hired killers armed with halberds and swords. He was stabbed in the head, right arm, and leg. Those who found him took him to the chamber of the Borgia Tower where he was cared for by his doctors from Naples, his half-sister Sancha and Lucrezia. While recovering from his injuries, Alfonso was strangled to death in his bed by a servant, possibly Micheletto Corella.

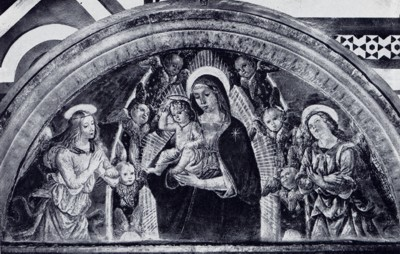
Lucrezia (left) with her son Rodrigo (on the right next to her) and her second husband, Alfonso of Aragon (to the very right), c. 1500 (shortly after the assassination of Alfonso of Aragon)

It was widely rumoured that Lucrezia's brother, Cesare, was responsible for Alfonso's death, as he had recently allied himself with France through his marriage to Charlotte d'Albret (sister of King John III of Navarre) in May 1499, against Naples.

Lucrezia and Alfonso had one child, Rodrigo of Aragon, named for his maternal grandfather, the Pope. He was born in 1500 and was baptized in the presence of many cardinals, ambassadors, and prelates from all over Italy. His godfather was Francesco Borgia, Archbishop of Cosenza, while Cardinal Carafa of Naples performed the baptismal rite in the Sistine Chapel. Rodrigo died in 1512 of a disease in Bari, Apulia, at the age of 12. Lucrezia withdrew to a convent to grieve for a month after her son died.

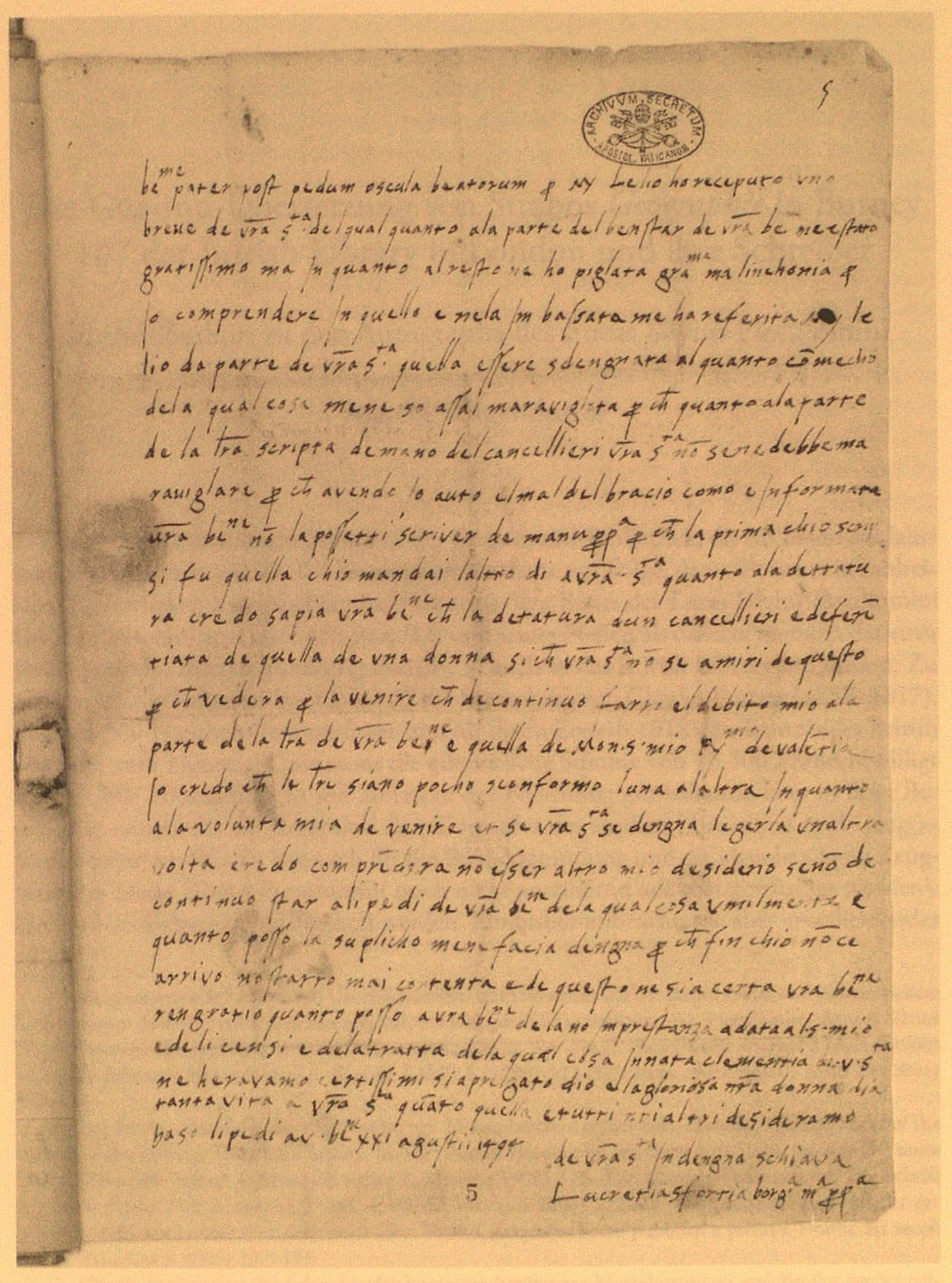
Autographed letter of Lucrezia Borgia to her father, Pope Alexander VI

After her second husband's death, Lucrezia acted as her father's private secretary in the Vatican, which involved opening his letters, informing him of the contents and replying to any which required an immediate response. Lucrezia was not accused of taking any undue advantage of this powerful position and was referred to as "wise, discreet and generous' by the Venetian ambassador, Polo Capello.

Lucrezia's father and brother Ceasare began arrangements for a third marriage. Five months after Alfonso's death, an engagement was announced for Lucrezia to Francesco Orsini, Duke of Gravina, but the plan was abandoned by her father. By January 1501, the Pope was pursuing a match for Lucrezia with the son of Ercole I d'Este, Duke of Ferrara. The d'Este family was one of the oldest and most powerful in Italy.

=== Third marriage: Alfonso I d'Este (Duke of Ferrara) ===
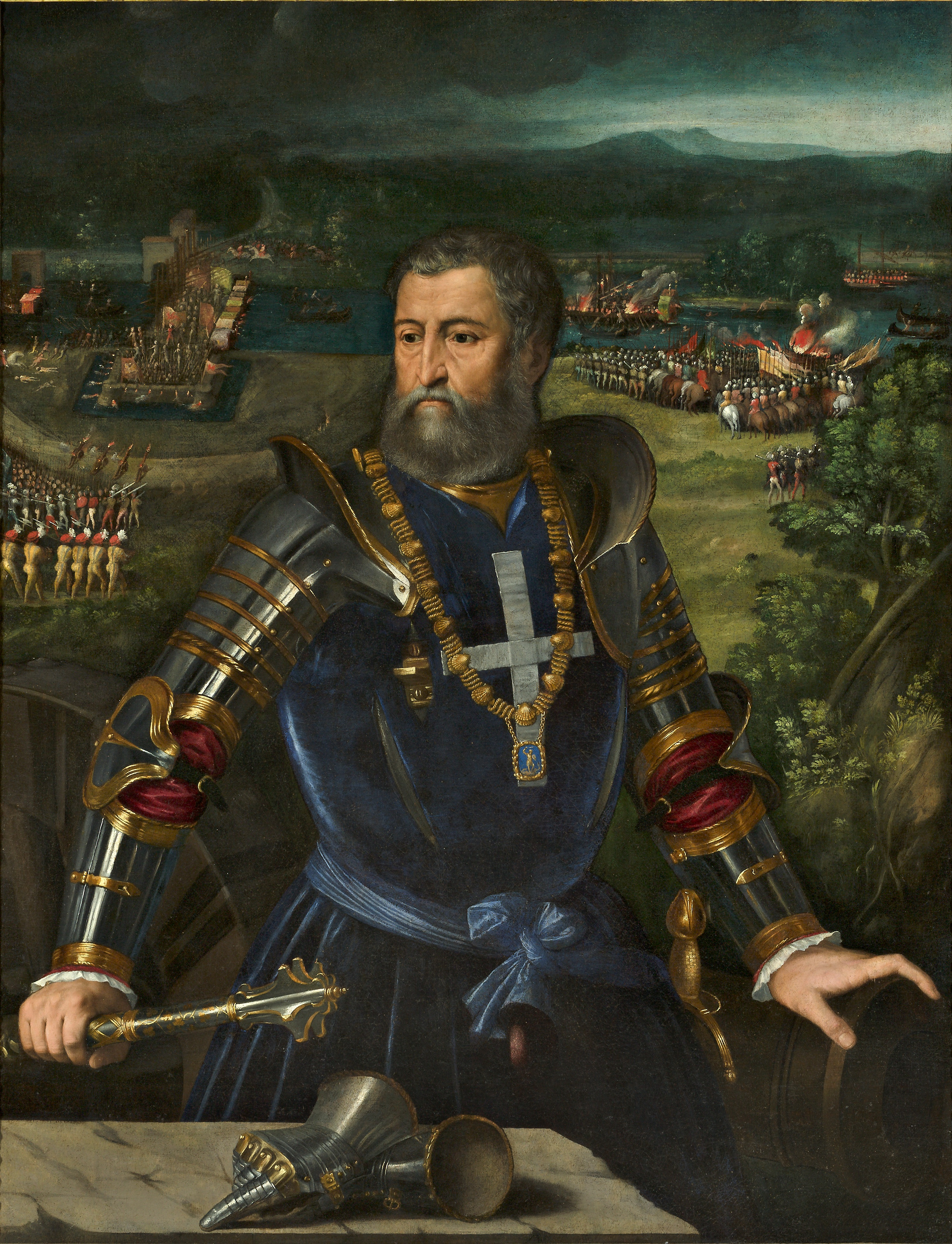
Portrait of Alfonso d'Este by Battista Dossi, painted between 1534 and 1536

Lucrezia married Alfonso I d'Este by proxy in Rome on 30 December 1501, with his brother Ferrante d'Este standing in for the groom, then in person on 2 February 1502 in Ferrara. Lucrezia's progress from Rome to Ferrara was through the Apennine Mountains and she both rode on horseback and was carried in a sedan chair, and was accompanied by ladies, retainers, musicians, and her brother Cesare.

Despite having given birth to a child, Lucrezia was obliged to simulate the appearance of a virgin spouse in order to marry d'Este and was forced to leave Rodrigo of Aragon, her only child by Alfonso of Aragon, behind. Lucrezia tried many times to have little Rodrigo in Ferrara, but her plans were ruined. She sent him gifts and letters and, when he was 9 years old, an educator from the University of Ferrara.

Lucrezia became Duchess of Ferrara from 1505 after the death of Alfonso's father Ercole. She gave birth to six children during her marriage to d'Este, including the future Duke of Ferrara, Ercole II d'Este.

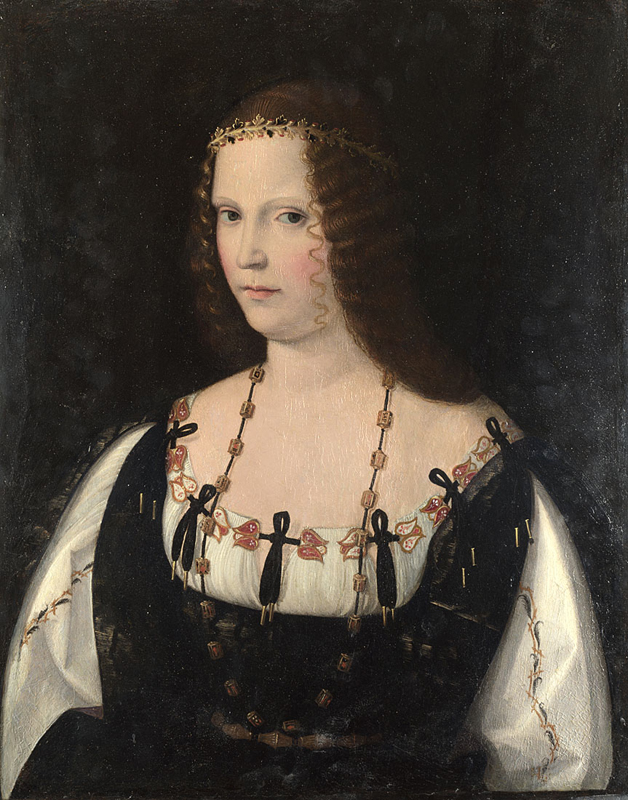
Possible portrait by Bartolomeo Veneziano (c. 1510)

However, neither partner was faithful. Beginning in 1503, Lucrezia enjoyed a long relationship with her brother-in-law, Francesco II Gonzaga, Marquis of Mantua. Francesco's wife was the cultured intellectual Isabella d'Este, the sister of Alfonso, to whom Lucrezia had made overtures of friendship, to no avail. The affair between Francesco and Lucrezia was passionate, more sexual than sentimental, as can be attested in the fevered love letters the pair wrote one another. It has been claimed that the affair ended when Francesco contracted syphilis and had to end sexual relations with Lucrezia. This may not be true, however, as Francesco had contracted syphilis before 1500; it was known that he passed the disease onto his eldest son, Federico Gonzaga, who was born in 1500. Francesco did not meet Lucrezia until 1502.

Lucrezia also had a love affair with the poet Pietro Bembo during her third marriage. Their love letters were deemed "the prettiest love letters in the world" by the Romantic poet Lord Byron when he saw them in the Ambrosian Library of Milan on 15 October 1816. The letters were published in 1859 under the title Lettere di Lucrezia Borgia a messer Pietro Bembo.

Due to Lucrezia's influence as a patron of the arts, the court of d'Este became a centre for aspiring Renaissance writers, musicians, poets and philosophers, including Ludovico Ariosto and Gian Giorgio Trissino. She was considered a respectable and accomplished Renaissance duchess, effectively rising above her previous reputation and surviving the fall of the Borgias following her father's death in 1503. She played a diplomatic role at the Ferrarese court, meeting with envoys and ruling the territory as regent twice during Alfonso's absences on military campaigns. She is also known to have overseen the management of her finances, buying and selling properties, buying marshland at a low cost then investing in reclamation enterprises, and renting parts of her newly arable land for short terms, which contributed to a nearly doubling of her annual income. She was a patron of charities and ecclesiastical foundations.

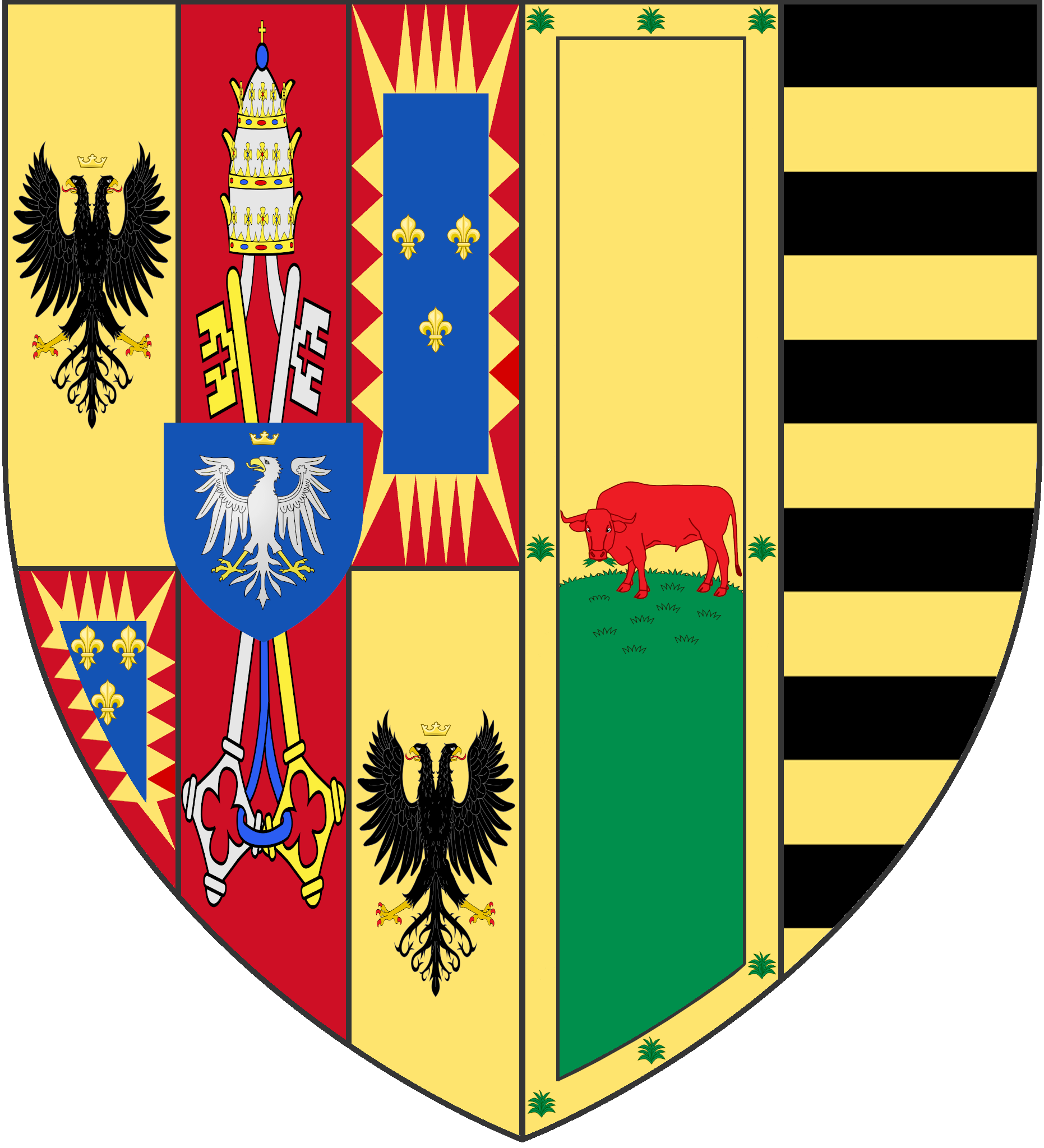
Coat of arms of Lucrezia Borgia as Duchess of Ferrara

Lucrezia was devastated upon Cesare's death in 1507. In 1510, Lucrezia's husband was excommunicated and Ferrara was placed under interdict by Pope Julius II. In response, she pawned her jewels to pay for the city's defense and entertained French troops that had come to Ferrara's aid. She met the famed French soldier, the Chevalier Bayard, while the latter was co-commanding the French allied garrison of Ferrara. According to his biographer, the Chevalier became a great admirer of Lucrezia's, considering her a "pearl on this Earth".

After a long history of complicated pregnancies and miscarriages, on 14 June 1519, Lucrezia gave birth to her tenth child, which she named Isabella Maria, in honour of Alfonso's sister, Isabella d'Este. Fearing the sickly child would die unbaptised, Alfonso ordered her to be baptized immediately, and Isabella died the same day. Eleonora Pico della Mirandola and Count Alexandro Serafino were chosen as godparents.

Lucrezia had become very weak during the pregnancy, and fell seriously ill after the birth. After seeming to recover for two days, she worsened again, and died on 24 June 1519 at Belriguardo Castle, aged 39. Her body was shrouded in the habit of a tertiary Franciscan and she was buried in the convent of Corpus Domini in Ferrara, Emilia-Romagna, where she had requested to be interred. She was deeply mourned by the people of Ferrara.

After Lucrezia's death, her brother-in-law Giovanni Gonzaga wrote to Isabella d'Este that: "It is said that the Duchess left behind a good amount of money, but the exact amount is unknown."

== Appearance ==
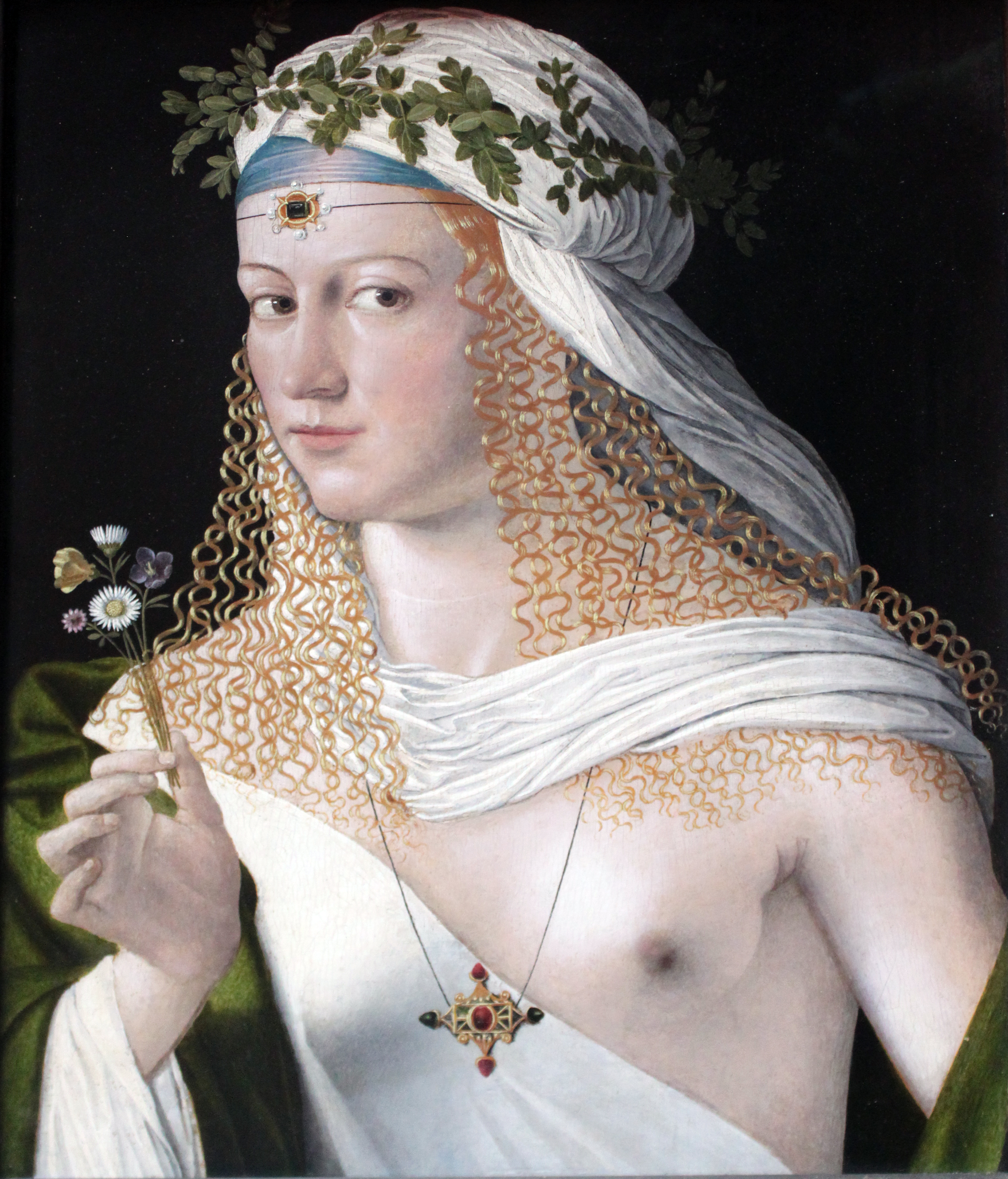
Portrait of a Woman by Bartolomeo Veneto, traditionally presumed to be Lucrezia Borgia

Lucrezia was described as having heavy blonde hair that fell past her knees, a beautiful complexion, hazel eyes that changed colour, a full, high bosom, and a natural grace that made her appear to "walk on air". In another description, the author wrote that "her mouth is rather large, the teeth brilliantly white, her neck is slender and fair, and the bust is admirably proportioned." These physical attributes were highly appreciated in Italy due to the similarity of her description with that of the Roman goddess of arts and war, Minerva.

One painting, Portrait of a Youth by Dosso Dossi at the National Gallery of Victoria, was identified as a portrait of Lucrezia in November 2008. The portrait had previously been considered to be of a young man, due to the dagger held in the sitter's hands, but also includes feminine motifs such as the myrtle bush and flowers. This painting may be the only surviving formal portrait of Lucrezia Borgia; however, doubts have been cast on that attribution.

Several other paintings, such as Veneto's fanciful portrait, have also been said to depict Lucrezia, but none has been accepted by scholars, at present.

According to Mandell Creighton in his History of the Papacy:

"Lucrezia was personally popular through her beauty and her affability. Her long golden hair, her sweet childish face, her pleasant expression and her graceful ways, seem to have struck all who saw her."

== Legacy ==
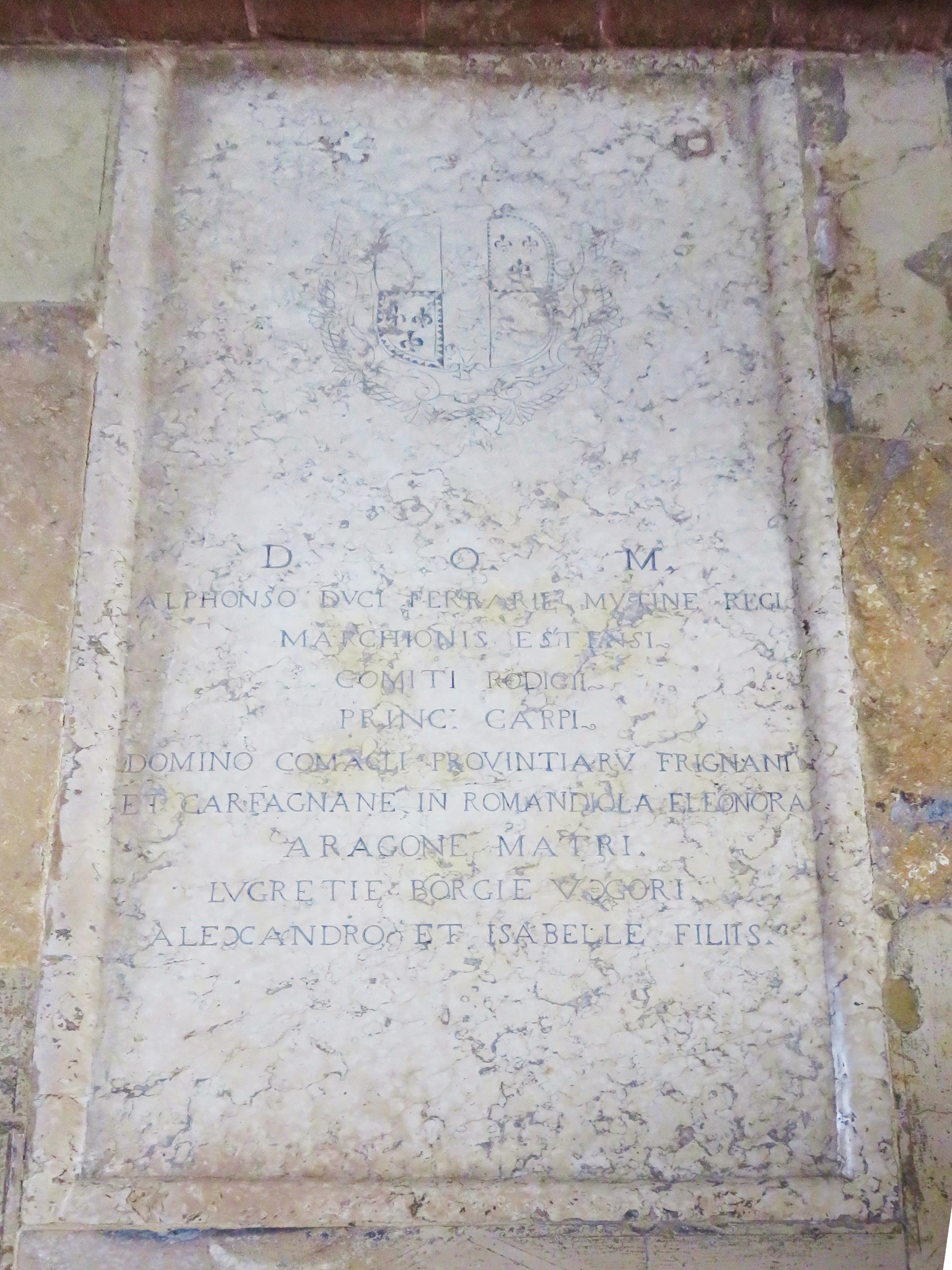
The conjoined tomb of Alfonso I d'Este and Lucrezia Borgia in Ferrara

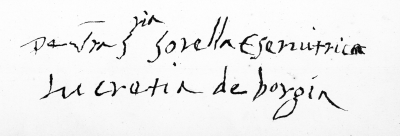
Signature of Lucrezia Borgia in a letter to her sister-in-law Isabella Gonzaga, March 1519

Since her death, many rumours surrounding Lucrezia have persisted, several concerning Lucrezia's alleged involvement in incest, poisoning, and murder. For example, it was rumoured that Lucrezia was in possession of a hollow ring that she used to poison drinks. However, no historical basis for these accusations exists, beyond the attacks of her enemies.

Another rumor concerns her attendance of extravagant, licentious parties thrown by her father and brother Cesare; one example is the legendary Banquet of Chestnuts.

A modern 20th-century British painting by Frank Cadogan Cowper that hangs in the Tate Britain art gallery in London portrays Lucrezia taking the place of her father, Pope Alexander VI, at an official Vatican meeting. This apparently documents an event, although the moment depicted (a Franciscan friar kissing Lucrezia's feet) was invented by the artist.

In 2002 the city of Ferrara celebrated an "Anno di Lucrezia Borgia" to commemorate the 500th anniversary of her arrival as the bride of the future duke.

== Issue ==
Lucrezia was mother to seven or eight known children:

1. A miscarriage / stillborn daughter (16 February 1499);
2. Rodrigo of Aragon (1 November 1499 – August 1512), son by Alfonso of Aragon;
3. A stillborn daughter (1502), first child by d'Este;
4. Alessandro d'Este (1505–1505);
5. Ercole II d'Este, Duke of Ferrara (5 April 1508 – 3 October 1559); married to Renée of France, the second daughter of Louis XII, King of France, and Anne of Brittany.
6. Ippolito II d'Este (25 August 1509 – 1 December 1572). Archbishop of Milan and later Cardinal;
7. Alessandro d'Este (1514–1516);
8. Leonora d'Este (3 July 1515 – 15 July 1575), a nun and composer;
9. Francesco d'Este, Marquess of Massalombarda (1 November 1516 – 2 February 1578);
10. Isabella Maria d'Este (born and died on 14 June 1519). Complications at birth caused the death of Lucrezia ten days later.

Giovanni Borgia, "infans Romanus" ("Child of Rome", c. 1498–1548) had his paternity acknowledged by Alexander and Cesare, in two Papal bulls, but it was rumoured that he was the child of Lucrezia and Pedro Calderon. The child (identified, in later life, as Lucrezia's half-brother) was most likely the result of a liaison between Rodrigo Borgia (Pope Alexander VI, Lucrezia's father) and an unknown mistress and was not Lucrezia's child.

The Italian historian Maria Bellonci claims that Lucrezia gave birth to three children who did not survive infancy, one by Alfonso of Aragon and two by Alfonso d'Este. She is also thought to have had at least four miscarriages.

== Archives ==
- 290 letters dating from the time of Lucrezia's marriage to Alfonso I d'Este, held at the State Archives of Modena, were digitised by Haltadefinizione in 2023.

== In popular culture ==
A Glass of Wine with Caesar Borgia by John Collier, 1893

=== Literature and opera ===
- F. M. Klinger's 1791 novel Fausts Leben, Thaten und Höllenfahrt features an episode in which the Borgias figure, including an affair between Faust and Lucrezia.
- French author Victor Hugo wrote in 1833 the stage play Lucrèce Borgia, which portrays her negatively.
- Victor Hugo's play was transformed into a libretto by Felice Romani for Donizetti's opera, Lucrezia Borgia (1834), first performed at La Scala, Milan, 26 December 1833.
- In 1912, the British author Margaret Gabrielle Vere Long, who wrote under the pseudonym Marjorie Bowen, published a short story called Twilight: Lucrezia Borgia, Duchess d'Este, a fictional account of the last moments of Lucrezia Borgia's life.
- The Dutch writer Louis Couperus published a story called Lucrezia in 1920 that takes place between the death of her second husband and the marriage of her third.
- The 1947 historical novel Prince of Foxes by Samuel Shellabarger describes the adventures of the fictional Andrea Orsini, a captain in the service of Cesare Borgia, during his conquest of the Romagna; it was made into a film of the same name in 1949, starring Orson Welles and Tyrone Power.
- Jean Plaidy's two 1958 novels Madonna of the Seven Hills and Light on Lucrezia follow the story of Lucrezia and her entanglement with her father and brothers.
- Lucrezia, Cesare and Alexander play key roles in Cecelia Holland's 1979 historical novel City of God: A Novel of the Borgias.
- In Roberta Gellis's 2003 novel Lucrezia Borgia and the Mother of Poisons (ISBN 9780765306616), Alfonso d'Este of Ferrara accuses Lucrezia of murder, and she must solve the crime and expose the true murderer.

=== In fiction ===
- In the Marvel Comics comic book Avengers West Coast No. 98 (September 1993), the demon Satannish resurrected Borgia as the supervillain Cyana. As a nod to her reputation for poisoning her lovers in life, Cyana could fatally poison people with sharpened nails or a kiss.
- The Family by Mario Puzo; published October 2001 ISBN 0-06-103242-5
- Gregory Maguire retells the story of Snow White with Lucrezia as the woman who poisons her, in his novel Mirror, Mirror; published October 2003 ISBN 0-06-039384-X
- The Borgia Bride by Jeanne Kalogridis; published 31 January 2005
- Kathleen McGowan refers to "Lucrece", as one of the many unjustly vilified women, in her book The Expected One. She refers in particular to Frank Cadogan Cowper's painting Lucretia Borgia Reigns in the Vatican in the Absence of Pope Alexander VI on display at the Tate Gallery in London.
- Lucrezia Borgia, A Novel by John Faunce; ISBN 9780307557636; Crown 2010
- Blood and Beauty by Sarah Dunant; ISBN 1-443-40644-9; ISBN 978-1-44340-644-4; Harper Collins Publishers Ltd 2013
- The Pope's Daughter by Dario Fo, translated from Italian by Antony Shugaar; ISBN 978-1-60945-274-2. Translation by Europa Editions 2015
- The Vatican Princess by C.W. Gortner; published 9 February 2016
- In the Name of the Family by Sarah Dunant; ISBN 978-1-84408-746-4; Virago Press 2017
- In the fictional fantasy universe Warhammer Fantasy, the character Lucrezzia Belladonna is a reference to Lucrezia Borgia. Lucrezzia is known for having poisoned several of her former lovers.

=== Film and television ===
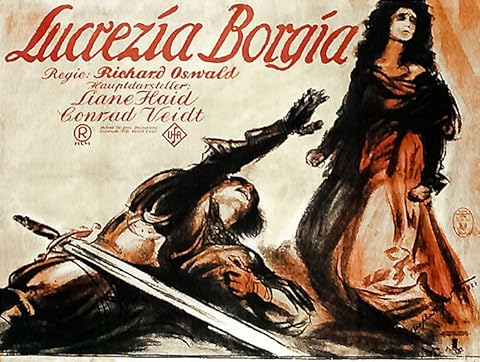
- German poster for Lucrezia Borgia (1922)
  German silent historical film Lucrezia Borgia (1922) is based on the life of Lucrezia, who is played by Liane Haid. Cesare Borgia is portrayed by Conrad Veidt.
- Lucrezia (Estelle Taylor) and Cesare (Warner Oland) Borgia are the major antagonists in Alan Crosland's 1926 silent film Don Juan, starring John Barrymore.
- Lucrezia is the subject of Abel Gance's film Lucrezia Borgia (1935) and of a 1953 French film, played by Martine Carol.
- Lucrezia is the Bride of Vengeance (1949), played by Paulette Goddard, with Macdonald Carey in the role of Cesare Borgia, and John Lund playing Alfonso d'Este (Duke of Ferrara).
- In Walerian Borowczyk's 1973 feature film Immoral Tales, Lucrezia is played by Florence Bellamy.
- In the Italian movie Lucrezia giovane ("Young Lucrezia") that was written and directed in 1974 by Luciano Ercoli (as André Colbert), Lucrezia was played by Simonetta Stefanelli.
- In the 1981 BBC series, The Borgias, Lucrezia was played by Anne-Louise Lambert.
- In the 1982 feature film The Secret Nights of Lucrezia Borgia of director Roberto Bianchi Montero, Lucrezia is played by Sirpa Lane.
- She is featured as a major plot point in the 1994 TV movie The Shaggy Dog. A portrait of her, along with a display case of her rings are featured in a local museum along with a legend that she had written spells to turn her lovers into dogs. The legend is revealed to be true as the main character accidentally casts one on himself while holding one of her rings and reading its inscription.
- In the pilot episode of the SyFy series Warehouse 13, a jewelled comb, purported to have been created for her by an alchemist, is used by an Iowa lawyer to hypnotize several individuals into causing acts of violence.
- In the video game Assassin's Creed: Brotherhood, Lucrezia is in an incestuous relationship with her brother Cesare. She is taken hostage by the main character, Ezio Auditore, and reappears later, a changed woman.
- Lucrezia is played by Holliday Grainger in the 2011–2013 Showtime/Bravo TV series The Borgias, which explores a theme of incest with Cesare, despite lack of historical evidence for such events. Her character is portrayed not as a ruthless murderer, but initially as a compassionate and sweet young girl who suffers from her family's ambitions, both struggling against and eventually aiding them.
- In the Canal+ television series Borgia, Lucrezia is portrayed by German actress Isolda Dychauk.
- In Season 1, Episode 7 of the television series The Adventures of Rocky and Bullwinkle and Friends, Mr. Peabody and his boy Sherman travel back in time to rescue Lucrezia's then-husband from being poisoned by her cooking.
- Lucrezia is mentioned in Season 1, episode 1 of My Three Sons.
- In the 1989 BBC television series Blackadder Goes Forth, the title character makes an offhand comment about Lucrezia throwing a "wine and anthrax party", presumably referring to the rumours that persist around the Borgia families' extravagant parties.
- Martha Howe-Douglas played Lucrezia Borgia in an episode of Horrible Histories which features a parody of The Addams Family theme.

=== Music ===
- English rock band The Sisters of Mercy reference Lucrezia as "Lucretia" in their 1988 single "Lucretia My Reflection", released as the third and final single from their second studio album, Floodland.
- The Megadeth song "Lucretia", which appears on their 1990 album Rust in Peace, is inspired by Lucrezia Borgia.

== See also ==
- Castello Borgia
- Felice della Rovere
- Route of the Borgias

== Notes ==
Lucrezia Borgia House of Borgia Born: 18 April 1480 Died: 24 June 1519
Royal titles
Vacant Title last held by Maddalena Gonzaga	Lady consort of Pesaro and Gradara; 12 June 1492 – 20 December 1497	Vacant Title next held by Ginevra Tiepolo
Vacant Title last held by Eleanor of Naples	Duchess consort of Ferrara, Modena and Reggio; 25 January 1505 – 24 June 1519	Vacant Title next held by Renée of France
