= Christopher Willis Gortner =

American novelist (1964–2025)

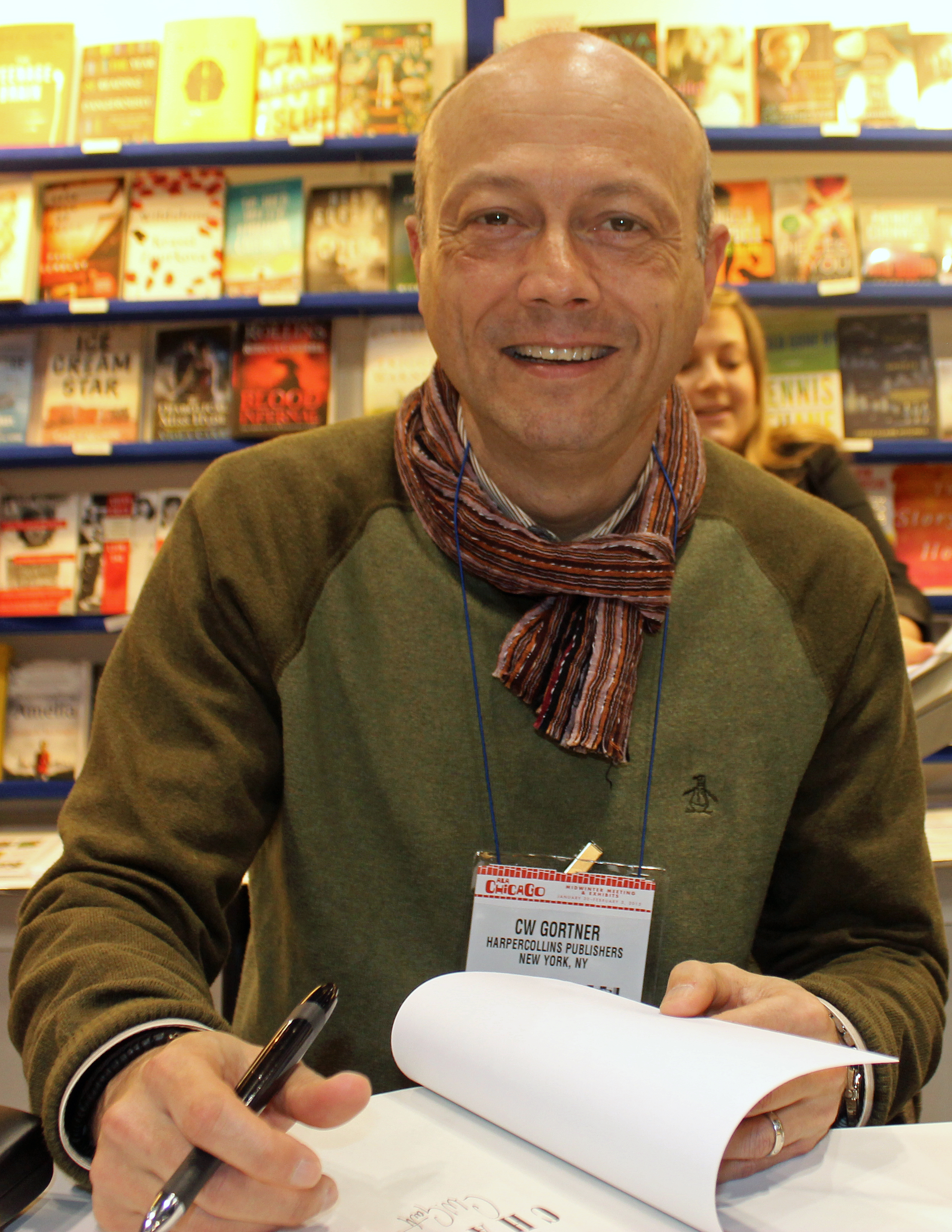
- Gortner in 2015
- Born: 1964; Washington D.C.
- Died: October 25, 2025 (aged 60–61)
- Education: Fashion Institute of Design & Merchandising (BA); New College of California (MFA)
- Website: Official author website

Christopher Willis Gortner (1964 – October 25, 2025) was an American author of historical fiction, including the novels The Last Queen, The Confessions of Catherine de Medici, and the Spymaster Trilogy.

His novels are translated in over 25 languages. The Queen’s Vow was an international bestseller in Poland. Mademoiselle Chanel was a USA Today best-seller, an American Booksellers Association bestseller, and both The Last Queen and Marlene were Marin Independent Journal best-sellers. He was named one of the top ten historical novelists by The Washington Independent Review of Books and has delivered keynote speeches as a Guest of Honor at the Historical Novel Society Conferences in the United States and the United Kingdom. For ten years before he was published and became a full-time writer, he was a public health administrative analyst. Previously, he worked as a fashion executive.

== Background ==
Gortner was born in 1964, in Washington D.C. (USA) and raised in Málaga (Spain). He was half-Spanish by birth. His family moved back to the U.S. when he was in his teens. He held a Bachelor of Arts in Marketing from the Fashion Institute of Design and Merchandising in San Francisco and Masters of Fine Arts in Writing with a concentration in Renaissance Studies from the New College of California.

Gortner lived in Northern California. He died on October 25, 2025.

== Books ==
- The Elizabeth I Spymaster Chronicles:
  - The Secret Lion Heliographica Press ISBN 9781933037356 (2004)
    in 2011 released as The Tudor Secret with an additional scene (St. Martin's Press, ISBN 978-0-312-60390-8)
  - The Tudor Conspiracy St. Martin's Press, ISBN 978-1-250-04277-4, (2013)
  - The Tudor Vendetta St. Martin's Press, ISBN 978-1-250-05853-9 (2014)
- The Last Queen: A Novel Ballantine Books, ISBN 978-0345501844, (2008), the history of Joanna of Castile
- The Confessions of Catherine De Medici: A Novel Ballantine Books, ISBN 978-0345501868, (2010), the history of Catherine de' Medici
- The Queen's Vow: A Novel of Isabella of Castile Ballantine Books, ISBN 978-0345523969, (2012), the history of Isabella I of Castile
- Mademoiselle Chanel: A Novel William Morrow and Company, ISBN 978-0062356406, (2015), the history of Coco Chanel
- The Vatican Princess: A Novel of Lucrezia Borgia Ballantine Books, ISBN 9780-345523969 (2016), the history of Lucrezia Borgia
- Marlene: A Novel of Marlene Dietrich William Morrow and Company ISBN 00624-0606X (2016), the history of Marlene Dietrich
- The Romanov Empress: A Novel of Tsarina Maria Feodorovna Ballantine Books ISBN 00624-0606X (2018) the history of Maria Feodorovna
- The First Actress. A Novel of Sarah Bernhardt Ballantine Books ISBN 9781524799076 (2020), the history of Sarah Bernhardt
- The American Adventuress: A Novel, William/HarperCollins ISBN 9780063035805 (2022), the history of Jennie Jerome Churchill
- The Saint Laurent Muse: A Novel, William Morrow Paperbacks ISBN 9780063319837 (2025), the history of friendship between Loulou de La Falaise and Yves St Laurent
