= List of composers in literature =

This list includes fictional representations of real (named) composers and musicians, and fictional characters under other names that are generally agreed to be based on a specific composer, or sometimes a composite of several. It doesn't include biographies, unless fictionalized.

Johann Sebastian Bach

- Esther Meynell: The Little Chronicle of Magdalena Bach (1925)
- Marc Moskovitz: The Eyes of Bach (2024)
- James Runcie: The Great Passion (2022)

Arnold Bax

- Rebecca West: Harriet Hume (1929) (The title character is based on Harriet Cohen, the Bax character is named Arnold Condorex)
- Jonathan Wylie: Magister (1997)

Ludwig van Beethoven

- Andrew Crumey: Beethoven's Assassins (2023)
- Jessica Duchan: Immortal (2020)
- Sanford Friedman: Conversations with Beethoven (1980s, published in 2014)
- Paul Griffiths: Mr Beethoven (2020)
- Esther Meynell: Grave Fairytale (1931) (as Melchior)
- Patricia Morrisroe: The Woman in the Moonlight (2020)
- Ken Russell: Beethoven Confidential (2007)
- Elizabeth Sara Sheppard: Rumour: A Novel (1858) (as Rodomant)
- John Suchet: The Last Master (1997–99) (fictional biography in three volumes)

Bix Beiderbecke

- Dorothy Baker: Young Man With a Horn (1938)
- George Willis: Three Musicians Trilogy (1943, 1945, 1947) (also Eddy Duchin and Frankie Trumbauer)

William Sterndale Bennett

- Elizabeth Sara Sheppard: Charles Auchester (1853) (as Starwood Burney)

Hector Berlioz

- Christine Balint: Ophelia's Fan: A Novel (2005)
- Anthony Burgess: Mozart & the Wolf Gang (1991)
- Jude Morgan: Symphony (2006)
- Elizabeth Sara Sheppard: Charles Auchester (1853) (as Florimond Anastasa)

Lord Berners

- (self-portrait, Lord FitzCricket in Far From the Madding War, 1941)
- Nancy Mitford: The Pursuit of Love (1945) (as Lord Merlin)
- Osbert Sitwell: 'The Love Bird' from Dumb Animal and Other Stories (1930) (as Sir Robert Mainwroth)

Hildegard of Bingen

- P.K. Adams: The Greenest Branch (2018) and The Column of Burning Spices (2019)
- Mary Sharratt: Illuminations (2012)

Mario Braggiotti

- F. Scott Fitzgerald: Tender is The Night (1934) (as Tommy Barban)

Johannes Brahms

- Boman Desai: Trio: A Novel Biography of the Schumanns and Brahms (2011)
- J. D. Landis: Longing (2000)
- Louise Marley: The Brahms Deception (2010)
- Ken Russell: Brahms Gets Laid (2007)
- Kristen Wolf: Escapement (2018)

Benjamin Britten

- Ian McEwan: Amsterdam (1998) (Clive Linley, correspondencies with Britten)

Thomas Busby

- George Borrow: Lavengro (1851) (as editor of the "Universal Review")

Frédéric Chopin

- Elizabeth Berg: Dream Lover (2015)
- Nancy Burkhalter: The Education of Delhomme: Chopin, Sand, and La France (2020)
- Jean Echenoz: Lac (1995, translated as Chopin's Move for the US edition, 2004)
- George Sand: Lucrezia Floriani (1846)
- Nell Stevens: Briefly, a Delicious Life (2022)
- Leon Thornber: Bitter Glory. A Novel of the Life of Chopin (1937)

Harriet Cohen

- William Gerhardie: Pending Heaven (1930) (as Helen Sapphire)
- D H Lawrence: Kangaroo (1923) (as Harriet)
- Rebecca West: Harriet Hume (1929)

Michael Costa

- Elizabeth Sara Sheppard: Charles Auchester (1853) (as St Michel)

Noël Coward

- Charles Brackett: Entirely Surrounded (1934) (as Nick Farraday)
- George S. Kaufman and Moss Hart: The Man Who Came to Dinner (play, as Beverley Carlton)
- Beverley Nichols: Death to Slow Music (as Nigel Fleet)
- David Pownall: Facade (radio play, 2002)
- Keith Winter: Impassioned Pygmies (1936)

Christian Darnton

- Nigel Balchin: Darkness Falls From the Air (1942) (as the poet Stephen Ryle)

Claude Debussy

- Anthony Burgess: '1889 and the Devil's Mode', short story in The Devil's Mode (1989)
- Pierre La Mure: Clair de lune (1962)
- Marcel Proust: À la recherche du temps perdu (1913-27) (aspects of Vinteuil, see also Franck and Saint-Saëns)

Frederick Delius

- C F Keary: The Journalist (1898) (as Sophus Jonsen)
- David Mitchell. Cloud Atlas (2004) (as Vyvyan Ayers, with Robert Frobisher as Eric Fenby)
- Ken Russell: Delius: A Moment with Venus (2007)

Edward J Dent

- E. M. Forster: Where Angels Fear to Tread (1905) (as Philip Herriton)

Delia Derbyshire

- Rosemary Tonks: The Bloater (1968) (as Jenny)

Arnold Dolmetsch

- George Moore: Evelyn Innes (1898) (as the father of Evelyn)

Karl Eliasberg

- Sarah Quigley: The Conductor (2012)

Edward Elgar

- Keith Alldritt: Elgar on the Journey to Hanley: A Novel (1979)
- Anthony Burgess: Mozart & the Wolf Gang (1991)
- James Hamilton-Paterson: Gerontius (1989)
- James Miles: The Worcester Enigma (short story, 1988)
- David Pownall: Elgar’s Rondo (1993) and Elgar's Third (1994)
- Ken Russell: Elgar: the Erotic Variations (2007)

John Field

- Yiyun Li: Music Against the Night (2026)

César Franck

- Ronald Harwood: Cesar and Augusta (1978)
- Marcel Proust: À la recherche du temps perdu (1913-27) (aspects of Vinteuil, see also Debussy and Saint-Saëns)

George Gershwin

- Anthony Burgess: Mozart & the Wolf Gang (1991)
- Steve Exeter. Debussy's Slippers (2019)
- Laura Frankos: Broadway Revival (2022)
- Mitchell James Kaplan. Rhapsody (2021)
- George Kaufman and Moss Hart: Merrily We Roll Along (1934) (as Sam Frankl)

Carlo Gesualdo

- Michel Breitman: Le Témoin de poussière (1985)
- Joel Epstein: The Curse of Gesualdo: Music, Murder and Madness (2020)
- Fran Kempton: The Devil's Tune: a Tale of Music, Murder and Revenge (2018)
- David Pownall: Music to Murder By (1976)
- Erika Rummel: The Road to Gesualdo (2020)

Jimmy Glover

- George Moore: A Mummer's Wife (1885) (as Montgomery)

Eugene Aynsley Goossens

- Inez Baranay: Pagan (1990)
- Louis Nowra: The Devil is a Woman (2004)

Glenn Gould

- Thomas Bernhard: The Loser (1983)
- Christopher Miller: Sudden Noises from Inanimate Objects: A Novel in Liner Notes (2004)

Cecil Gray

- H.D.: Bid Me to Live (1960) (as Vane)
- Aldous Huxley: Antic Hay (1923) (as the critic Mercaptan)
- D. H.Lawrence: Aaron's Rod (1922) (as Cyril Scott)
- D. H.Lawrence: Kangaroo (1923) (as James Sharpe)
- Anthony Powell: Casanova's Chinese Restaurant (Maclintick and Gossege as a composite)

Jan Hambourg

- Willa Cather: The Professor's House (as the professor's son-in-law, Louie Marsellus)

George Frideric Handel

- Nick Drake: All the Angels: Handel and the First Messiah (2015)

Johann Adolf Hasse

- Elise Polko: Faustina Hasse (1860)

Josef Matthias Hauer

- Hermann Hesse: The Glass Bead Game (1943) (as model for Joculator Basiliensis ("the player from Basel").
- Otto Stoessl': Sonnenmelodie (1923)
- Franz Werfel: Verdi. Roman der Oper (1924) (as Matthias Fischboeck)

Augusta Holmes

- Ronald Harwood: Cesar and Augusta (1978)

Charles Edward Horsley

- Elizabeth Sara Sheppard: Charles Auchester (1853) (as Charles Auchester)

John Pyke Hullah

- Elizabeth Sara Sheppard: Charles Auchester (1853) (as Lenhart Davy)

Halfdan Jebe

- C F Keary: The Journalist (1898) (as Hauch)

Maurice Jacobson

- Stevie Smith: Novel on Yellow Paper (1936) (as Herman)

Joseph Joachim

- Elizabeth Sara Sheppard: Charles Auchester (1853) (as Charles Auchester)

Aram Khachaturian

- David Pownall: Master Class (1982)

Constant Lambert

- Anthony Powell: Casanova's Chinese Restaurant (as Moreland)
- David Pownall: Facade (radio play, 2002)

Henry Lawes

- Robert Graves: Wife to Mr Milton (1942)

Madame Levinskaya

- Bernice Rubens: Madame Sousatzka (1962)

Franz Liszt

- Daniel Stern: Nélida (1846)
- Honoré de Balzac: Béatrix (1839) (as Gennaro Conti)
- Susanne Dunlap: Liszt's Kiss (2007)
- George Eliot: Daniel Deronda (1876) (aspects of Julius Klesmer, see also Rubenstein)
- Julian Livingston: The Anonymous North American Tour of Franz Liszt (1999)
- Sarah Rayne: Music Macabre (2019)
- John Spurling: A Book of Liszts: Variations on the Theme of Franz Liszt (2011)

Elisabeth Lutyens

- Henry Reed: The Private Life of Hilda Tablet (1954) (as Tablet)

Alma Mahler

- Joseph Horowitz: The Marriage: The Mahlers in New York (2023)
- Max Phillips: The Artist’s Wife (2001)
- James Reidel: Manon's World (2020)
- Mary Sharratt: Ecstasy (2018)

Gustav Mahler

- Willa Cather: The Song of the Lark (1915)
- Ronald Harwood: Mahler’s Conversion (2001)
- Joseph Horowitz: The Marriage: The Mahlers in New York (2023
- Walter Kappacher: Mahlers Heimkehr (2014)
- Thomas Mann: Death in Venice (aspects of the author Aschenbach)
- Frank Tallis: Death and the Maiden (2010)
- Stefan Zweig: The Return of Gustav Mahler (1915), semi-fictional essay

Florence Ashton Marshall (and her sister, the clarinettist Frances Marshall)

- Bertha Thomas: The Violin Player (1880)

Fanny Mendelssohn

- Peter Härtling: Liebste Fenchel (2011)
- Myla Lichtman-Fields: Felix and Fanny (play, 2011)
- Elizabeth Sara Sheppard: Charles Auchester (1853) (as Maria Cerinthea)

Felix Mendelssohn

- Rosemarie Bodenheimer: Mendelssohn & Co: a Fictive Memoir (2018)
- Anthony Burgess: Mozart & the Wolf Gang (1991)
- Pierre La Mure: Beyond Desire (1955)
- George Sampson: A Day with Mendelssohn (1910)
- Elizabeth Sara Sheppard: Charles Auchester (1853) (as Seraphael)

Noel Mewton-Wood

- Sonia Orchard: The Virtuoso (2009)

Wolfgang Amadeus Mozart

- Anthony Burgess: Mozart & the Wolf Gang (1991)
- Rita Charbonnier: The Death of Mozart (2006)
- Stephanie Cowell: Marrying Mozart (2004)
- Eduard Mörike: Mozart's Journey to Prague (1856)
- Alexander Pushkin: Mozart and Salieri (1830)
- Matt Rees: Mozart's Last Aria (2011)
- Peter Shaffer: Amadeus (1979)

Niccolò Paganini

- Elisa Polko: Nicolo Paganini und die Geigenbauer (1876)
- Anatoliĭ Vinogradov: Defaimarea lui Paganini (1936)

Maria Theresia von Paradis

- Julian Barnes: 'Harmony', from the short story collection Pulse (2011)
- Brian O'Doherty: The Strange Case of Mademoiselle P (1992)
- Michèle Halberstadt. The Pianist in the Dark (2011)
- Jean Thuillier: Franz Anton Mesmer ou L'extase Magnétique (1988)
- Alissa Walser: Mesmerized (2012)

Hubert Parry

- George Bernard Shaw: Love Among the Artists (1881) (as Owen Jack)

Helen Perkin

- Carl Ginsburg: Medicine Journeys: Ten Stories (Center Press, 1983) (as Mrs Todd Ashby)

Sergei Prokofiev

- Julian Barnes: The Noise of Time (2016)
- Anthony Burgess: Mozart & the Wolf Gang (1991)
- David Pownall: Master Class (1982)

Maurice Ravel

- Arnold Bennett: The Lion's Share (1916) {as Roussel)
- Michel Bernard: Les forêts de Ravel (2016)
- Jonathan Coe: Lessons in Harmony (2026)
- Jean Echenoz: Ravel: a Novel (2009, translated 2011)
- Steve Exeter. Debussy's Slippers (2019)

Gioachino Rossini

- Anthony Burgess: Mozart & the Wolf Gang (1991)

Harold Rubens

- Bernice Rubens: Madame Souzatzka (1962) (as Manek)

Anton Rubinstein

- George Eliot: Daniel Deronda (1876) (aspects of Julius Klesmer, see also Liszt)

Camille Saint-Saëns

- Marcel Proust: À la recherche du temps perdu (1913-27) (aspects of Vinteuil, see also Debussy and Franck)

Antonio Salieri

- Alexander Pushkin: Mozart and Salieri (1830)
- Peter Shaffer: Amadeus (1979)

Godfrey Sampson

- Edmund Crispen: Holy Disorders (1945) (as Geoffrey Vintner)

Pablo de Sarasate

- Anthony Burgess: 'Murder to Music', short story in The Devil's Mode (1989)

Erik Satie

- Caitlin Horrocks: Vexations (2019)

Arnold Schoenberg

- Thomas Mann: Doctor Faustus (1947) (aspects of Adrian Leverkühn, see also Wolf)

Franz Schubert

- Peter Härtling: Schubert: A Novel (1995)
- Gaëlle Josse: Un été à quatre mains

Clara Schumann

- Boman Desai: Trio: A Novel Biography of the Schumanns and Brahms (2011)
- Janice Galloway: Clara (2004)
- Dieter Kühn: Familientreffen (play, 1988)
- Elisabeth Kyle: Duet: The Story of Robert and Clara Schumann (1968)
- J. D. Landis: Longing (2000)
- Werner Quednau: Clara Schumann (1955)
- Kristen Wolf: Escapement (2018)

Robert Schumann

- Boman Desai: Trio: A Novel Biography of the Schumanns and Brahms (2011)
- Jessica Duchen: Ghost Variations (2016)
- Peter Härtling: Schumanns Schatten (1996)
- Elisabeth Kyle: Duet: The Story of Robert and Clara Schumann (1968)
- J. D. Landis: Longing (2000)
- Kristen Wolf: Escapement (2018)

Dmitri Shostakovich

- Julian Barnes: The Noise of Time (2016)
- David Pownall: Master Class (1982)
- Sarah Quigley: The Conductor (2012)
- William T. Vollmann: Europe Central (2005)

Jean Sibelius

- Simon Boswell: The Seven Symphonies: A Finnish Murder Mystery (2005)
- Caroline J Sinclair: My Music, My Drinking & Me (2015) (fictionalised memoir)

Ethel Smyth

- E. F. Benson: Dodo (1893) (as Edith Staines)

Kaikhosru Sorabji

- Christopher Miller: Sudden Noises from Inanimate Objects: A Novel in Liner Notes (2004)

Igor Stravinsky

- Chris Greenhalgh: Coco and Igor (2002)

Barbara Strozzi

- Russell Hoban. My Tango with Barbara Strozzi (2007) (as modern day Bertha Strunk)

Arthur Sullivan

- Nicholas Meyer. The West End Horror (1976)

Kay Swift

- Mitchell James Kaplan. Rhapsody (2021)

Ralph Vaughan Williams

- Jonathan Coe: Lessons in Harmony (2026)

Giuseppe Verdi

- Franz Werfel. Verdi: Roman der Oper (1923) (as Matthias Fischboeck)

Pauline Viardot

- Alexander Chee: The Queen of the Night (2016)
- Joie Davidow: An Unofficial Marriage (2021)

Antonio Vivaldi

- Harriet Constable: The Instrumentalist (2024)
- Barbara Quick: Vivaldi's Virgins (2007)

Richard Wagner

- Gabriele D'Annunzio: The Flame (1900)
- Anthony Burgess: Mozart & the Wolf Gang (1991)
- Vernon Lee: A Wicked Voice (short story, 1880)
- Friedrich Nietzsche: Thus Spoke Zarathustra (1883-5) (as the sorcerer)
- Franz Werfel: Verdi: Roman der Oper (1924) (under his own name and also as Matthias Fischboeck)

William Walton

- Lord Berners: Count Omega (1941) (as Emmanuel Smith)
- David Pownall: Facade (radio play, 2002)

Peter Warlock

- Frank Baker: The Birds (1936) (as Paul Weaver)
- Ralph Bates: Dead End of the Sky (1937) (as Robert Durand)
- Robertson Davies: A Mixture of Frailties (1958) (as Giles Revelstoke)
- Aldous Huxley: Antic Hay (1923) (as Coleman)
- D. H. Lawrence: Women in Love (1921) (as Julius Halliday)
- Anthony Powell: Casanova's Chinese Restaurant (1960) (aspects of Maclintick)
- David Pownall: Music to Murder By (1976)
- Jean Rhys: Till September Petronella (short story, 1930s) (as Julian Oakes)
- Osbert Sitwell: Those Were the Days (1938) (as Roy Hartle)

Hugo Wolf

- Thomas Mann: Doctor Faustus (1947) (aspects of Adrian Leverkühn, see also Schoenberg)

Carl Friedrich Zelter

- Elizabeth Sara Sheppard: Charles Auchester (1853) (as Aronach)
