= Charles Auchester =

1853 novel by Elizabeth Sara Sheppard

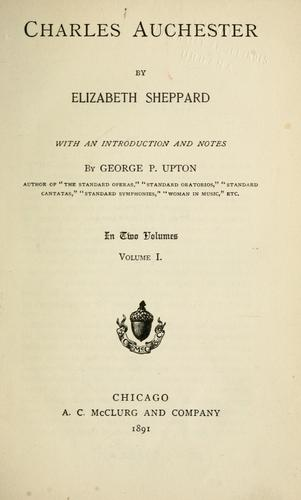
Charles Auchester: an American edition of 1891

Charles Auchester is a novel by Elizabeth Sara Sheppard, published in 1853. Its hero is an idealised portrait of the composer Felix Mendelssohn. The novel, which is notable for its positive portrayal of Jewish musicality, was praised by Benjamin Disraeli and was initially very popular, remaining in print for over seventy years.

== Novel ==
The novel, which was written between the years of 1846 and 1849, reflects the author's adulation of Felix Mendelssohn, who had died in 1847 (when the author was 17 years old), and who appears in the book as 'the Chevalier Seraphael'.

The book, which is set in England and Germany, describes Seraphael's artistic and moral influence on a body of gifted friends and students, as narrated by the eponymous Auchester. Auchester has been assumed to represent Charles Horsley. Other thinly veiled members of Seraphael's circle are his pupil 'Starwood Burney' (Sterndale Bennett), the singer 'Clara Benette' (Jenny Lind) and the composer 'Anastase' (Hector Berlioz).

The book attributes much of Seraphael/Mendelssohn's musical ability to his Jewish origins. At one point, a conversation between the character Aronach (based on Mendelssohn's teacher Carl Zelter), and Auchester runs:

'Of music ... doubt not that it is into a divine and immeasurable realm thou shalt at length be admitted; and bow contented that thou hast this in common with those above thee – the insatiable presentiment of futurity with which the Creator has chosen to endow the choicest of his gifts – the gift in its perfection granted ever to the choicest, the rarest of the race.'

'And that is why it is granted to the Hebrew nation – why they all possess it like a right!' I cried.

The book thus belongs in a tradition of pro-Jewish English fiction which includes Maria Edgeworth's Harrington (1817) and Benjamin Disraeli's Coningsby (1844). Sheppard herself had Jewish ancestry, and when she sent a draft of her novel to Disraeli he responded "No greater book will ever be written on music." When the book was published in 1853 it bore the dedication "To the author of Contarini Fleming" (Disraeli's 1832 autobiographical novel).

Her later novel Rumour includes a character named "Rodomant" based on Beethoven.

== Reception ==
The book was originally published anonymously and was attributed by some to a Rothschild. Reviewing the novel in the Athenaeum, the critic Henry Chorley described the work as "half-crazy" whilst acknowledging its "true, fervid, feeling".

The novel was initially enormously popular and remained continuously in print until 1928. A more recent critic echoes Chorley in considering the book "naive throughout and at times ridiculously inept," but redeemed to some extent by the author's evident and genuine love for music. Another writer finds that Sheppard goes beyond the mere story-line to indicate views on the moral and educational importance of music, reflecting the Victorian belief in music as a means to self-improvement.

== See also ==
List of composers in literature
