= Jon Silkin =

British poet (1930–1997)

- Born: 2 December 1930; London, England
- Died: 25 November 1997 (aged 66); Newcastle upon Tyne, England
- Education: Wycliffe College; Dulwich College; University of Leeds
- Occupation: Poet
- Known for: Founder of Stand magazine
- Parent(s): Joseph Silkin and Doris Rubenstein
- Relatives: Lewis Silkin, 1st Baron Silkin (uncle)

Jon Silkin (2 December 1930 – 25 November 1997) was a British poet. He was also the founder of Stand magazine in 1952.

== Early life ==
Jon Silkin was born in London, in a Litvak Jewish family; his parents were Joseph Silkin and Doris Rubenstein. His grandparents were all from the Lithuanian part of the Russian Empire. His uncle was Lewis Silkin, 1st Baron Silkin. He was named Jon after Jon Forsyte in The Forsyte Saga, and attended Wycliffe College and Dulwich College. During the Second World War, Silkin was one of the children evacuated from London (in his case, to Wales); he remembered that he "roamed the countryside incessantly" while in Wales, collecting "fool's gold" and exploring old Roman mines.

For a period of about six years in the 1950s, after National Service, he supported himself by manual labour and other menial jobs. By 1956, he rented the top-floor flat at 10, Compayne Gardens, Hampstead, (51.5463°N 0.1822°W), the house of Bernice Rubens, who later won the Booker Prize, and her husband Rudolf Nassauer, also a published novelist. Silkin, in turn, sublet rooms to, among others, David Mercer, later a prolific TV and West End dramatist, and Malcolm Ross-Macdonald, then a diploma student at the Slade School of Fine Art and later a novelist. Ross-Macdonald's first novel, The Big Waves (Cape, 1962) is a roman à clef of life in that flat, in which Silkin features as "Somes Arenstein". All three men lived by teaching English as a foreign language at the St Giles School of English in Oxford Street.

== Poetry ==
Silkin wrote a number of works on the war poetry of World War I. He was known also as editor of the literary magazine Stand, which he founded in 1952, and which he continued to edit (with a hiatus from 1957 to 1960) until his death.

His first poetry collection, The Peaceable Kingdom was published in 1954. It contains his moving poem "Death of a Son":

...
He turned over on his side with his one year
Red as a wound
He turned over as if he could be sorry for this
And out of his eyes two great tears rolled, like stones, and he died.

The collection was followed by several more. The Lens Breakers was published by Sinclair Stevenson in 1992. Silkin edited several anthologies and books of criticism, most notably on the poets of the First World War. He lectured and taught widely, both in Britain and abroad (in among other places the United States, Israel, and Japan).

Silkin founded Stand in 1952 in London. He began an association with the University of Leeds in 1958, when he was awarded, as a mature student, a two-year Gregory Fellowship, and where he read for a degree in English. Stand moved with him to Leeds, and the archives of Stand are now at the university. In 1965, Northeast Arts offered funding, and he moved to Newcastle upon Tyne, where he lived until his death.

Silkin was working with Cargo Press on his collection Testament Without Breath at the time of his death in November 1997.

== Works ==
- The Portrait and Other Poems (1950)
- The Peaceable Kingdom (1954)
- The Two Freedoms (1958)
- New Poems 1960 (1960), editor with Anthony Cronin and Terence Tiller
- Living Voices (1960)
- The Re-Ordering of the Stones (1961)
- Flash Point: An Anthology of Modern Poetry (1964). Only the introduction is by Silkin; the selection, survey and notes are by Robert Shaw
- Flower Poems (1964), second edition 1978
- Penguin Modern Poets 7 (1965), with Richard Murphy and Nathaniel Tarn
- Nature with Man (1965)
- Poems New And Selected (1966)
- New and Selected Poems (1966)
- Against Parting by Natan Zach (c. 1967), translator from Hebrew
- Three Poems (1969)
- Poems (1969) editor with Vernon Scannell
- Pergamon Poets VIII (1970), editor with Vernon Scannell
- Amana Grass (1971)
- Killhope Wheel (1971)
- Out of Battle: The Poetry of the Great War (1972)
- Air That Pricks the Earth (1973)
- Poetry of the Committed Individual: A "Stand" Anthology of Poetry (1973), editor
- The Principle of Water (1974)
- A 'Jarapiri' Poem (1975)
- The Peaceable Kingdom (1975)
- Two Images of Continuing Trouble (19760
- The Little Time-Keeper (1976)
- Jerusalem (1977)
- Into Praising (1978)
- Out of Battle, the Poetry of the Great War (1978)
- The Penguin Book of First World War Poetry (1979), editor
- New Poetry 5: An Arts Council Anthology (1979), editor with Peter Redgrove
- The Lapidary Poems (1979)
- Selected Poems (1980)
- The Psalms and their Spoils (1980)
- Autobiographical Stanzas: 'Someone's Narrative' (1983)
- Footsteps on a Downcast Path (1984)
- Gurney: A Play (1985)
- The Ship's Pasture (1986)
- Selected Poems (1980) new edition
- The Penguin Book of First World War Prose (1989), editor with Jon Glover
- The Lens-Breakers (1992)
- Selected Poems (1993)
- Wilfred Owen: The War Poems (1994) editor
- Watersmeet (1994)
- The Life of Metrical & Free Verse in Twentieth-Century Poetry (1997)
- Testament Without Breath (1998)
- Making a Republic (2002)
- Complete Poems (2015)

== Poetry of the Committed Individual (1973) ==
A Stand anthology, edited by Silkin. The poets included were:

Dannie Abse – David Avidan – John Barrell – Wendell Berry – John Berryman – Alexander Blok – Johannes Bobrowski – Bertolt Brecht – T. J. Brindley – Joseph Brodsky – Alan Brownjohn – León Felipe – Antonio Cisneros – Peter Dale – Gunnar Ekelöf – Hans Magnus Enzensberger – Roy Fisher – Paavo Haavikko – John Haines – Michael Hamburger – Tony Harrison – John Haynes – John Heath-Stubbs – Zbigniew Herbert – Nazim Hikmet – Geoffrey Hill – Anselm Hollo – Miroslav Holub – Peter Huchel – Philip Levine – Emanuel Litvinoff – George MacBeth – Sorley Maclean – Christopher Middleton – Ewart Milne – Norman Nicholson – Tom Pickard – Maila Pylkkönen – Miklós Radnóti – Tom Raworth – Tadeusz Różewicz – Pentti Saarikoski – Jon Silkin – Iain Crichton Smith – Ken Smith – Vladimir Soloukhin – William Stafford – Marina Tsvetayeva – Giuseppe Ungaretti – César Vallejo – Andrei Voznesensky – Jeffrey Wainwright – Ted Walker – Nathan Whiting – James Wright – Yevgeny Yevtushenko – Natan Zach
