= Charles Edward Horsley =

English musician (1822–1876)

Charles Edward Horsley (16 December 1822 – 28 February 1876) was an English musician and composer. He was the son of William Horsley and grandson of John Wall Callcott, both of whom were notable musicians. Horsley was depicted as the composer "Auchester" in Elizabeth Sara Sheppard's novel Charles Auchester (1853).

== Early career ==
He received his first musical training from his father and Ignaz Moscheles. Felix Mendelssohn, a family friend, advised Horsley to study music in Germany, where his teachers included Moritz Hauptmann in Kassel. From 1841, Horsley spent the following three years in Leipzig, in which he remained in contact with Mendelssohn and his circle. This period was also when Horsley began composing music, including a Symphony in D minor.

On his return to England, Horsley established himself as a teacher while continuing to compose. Around 1850, while living in Liverpool, he composed two oratorios for the Philharmonic Society and the anthem I was glad. He returned to London in 1853 to become organist of St John the Evangelist, Notting Hill, where he stayed until 1857. In 1856, he was passed over by William Sterndale Bennett for the Cambridge professorship. Bennet subsequently asked him to become a founder member of the Bach Society. In 1860, he was appointed to arrange the music for the 1862 International Exhibition in London, and composed his third oratorio, Gideon, for the first Glasgow Festival.

== Australia and America ==
In 1861 Horsley emigrated to Australia, where he worked as a choral and orchestral conductor. A string quartet in C major, the manuscript of which is dated March 1861, was completed shortly after his arrival and is probably the first work for this combination to have been written on Australian soil. He was appointed as the organist at Christ Church, South Yarra, but resigned after six months, frustrated by Bishop Perry's injunctions against music (Perry being an extreme Evangelical). While there he was commissioned to compose a cantata Euterpe to a poem by Henry Kendall, performed for the opening of Melbourne Town Hall in 1876, and also performed at the Crystal Palace in London the same year.

In 1872 Horsley went to America. Three weeks after his arrival he was appointed organist of St John's Chapel, New York at a salary of £500 a year, which position he filled to the day of his death. In the United States he wrote sentimental and patriotic songs, which continued to appear until the last year of his life. His wife, Georgina, to carry out his wishes, returned his body to London, placing him to rest near and with his own people in Kensal Green Cemetery in London.

== Music ==
Horsley's music is heavily influenced by Mendelssohn. He initially composed chamber music, including multiple sonatas for flute, violin and cello, trios, string quartets and piano quartets, as well as around 40 piano pieces. But (as with his older contemporaries T.A. Walmisley and Sterndale Bennett) he soon found himself expected to compose choral music. There are three oratorios: David, Op.30 (1850), Joseph, Op.39 (1853) and Gideon (1860), two odes (Comus, 1874 and Euterpe, 1876), four anthems and various songs. The orchestral works include his Symphony in D, Op.9 (1842-4), a Piano Concerto (1848), and the overtures Genoveva (1853) and The Merry Wives of Windsor (1857). The world première of his Violin Concerto, Op. 29, composed in 1849, was performed on October 11, 2016, in Fayetteville, Arkansas by violinist Selim Giray and University of Arkansas Symphony Orchestra under the direction of conductor Robert K. Mueller.
