= Constance Warren =

Constance Warren may refer to:

- Constance Whitney Warren (1888–1948), American sculptor
- Constance Warren (composer) (1905–1984), English composer and piano teacher
