= Bach Society =

Musical organization

The Bach Society was a musical organization in London from 1849 to 1870. Its primary goals, as stated in its prospectus, were (1) to collect the works of Johann Sebastian Bach, both printed and in manuscript, and all works related to him, his family, or his music; and (2) the furtherance and promotion of a general acquaintance with his music by its public performance.

The original committee of management consisted of William Sterndale Bennett (founder and chairman), R. Barnett, G. Cooper, F. R. Cox, J. H. B. Dando, W. Dorrell, W. H. Holmes, Edward John Hopkins, Charles Edward Horsley, John Hullah, H. J. Lincoln, O. May, and Henry Smart, with Sir George Smart and Cipriani Potter as auditors, and Charles Steggall as honorary secretary.

The Society was dissolved on 21 March 1870. Their library of music was passed to the Royal Academy of Music and in 1984 the Committee papers were donated by the Sterndale Bennett family to the library of Royal College of Music.

== Performances ==
Under the auspices of the society, the first performance in England of the St Matthew Passion took place at the Hanover Square Rooms on 6 April 1854, Sterndale Bennett conducting. The principal female vocalists were Mme. Ferrari, Misses B. Street, Charlotte Sainton-Dolby, Dianelli, and Freeman; the principal male vocalists were Allen, Walworth, W. Bolton, and Signor Ferrari. Mr. W. Thomas was principal violin, Mr. Grattan Cooke first oboe, and Edward John Hopkins was at the organ, the new instrument by Gray and Davison being used on this occasion for the first time. The English version of the words was by Miss Helen F. H. Johnston. A second performance was given at St Martin's Hall on 23 March 1858, Sterndale Bennett again conducting. The audience on this occasion included Prince Albert of Saxe-Coburg and Gotha. Another performance was given in 1862, coinciding with the publication of Bennett's own edition of the work, with a translation of the text into English by his pupil Helen Johnston.

On 21 June 1859 the Society gave a performance of miscellaneous works by Bach, including the C minor piano concerto, the Chaconne for violin (by Joseph Joachim), and the Solo Fugue for piano in D. The concert of 1860, on 24 July, included the first eleven movements from the Mass in B minor. Three years later, on 13 June 1861, the Society gave the first performance in England of the Christmas Oratorio also under Sterndale Bennett's direction.

== Notes ==
Sources

- Parrott, Isabel (2008). "William Sterndale Bennett and the Bach Revival in Nineteenth-Century England". In Rachel Cowgill; Julian Rushton (eds.). Europe, Empire, and Spectacle in Nineteenth-Century British Music. Aldershot: Ashgate Publishing. ISBN 978-0-7546-5208-3.
