= Selim Giray =

Turkish-American musician

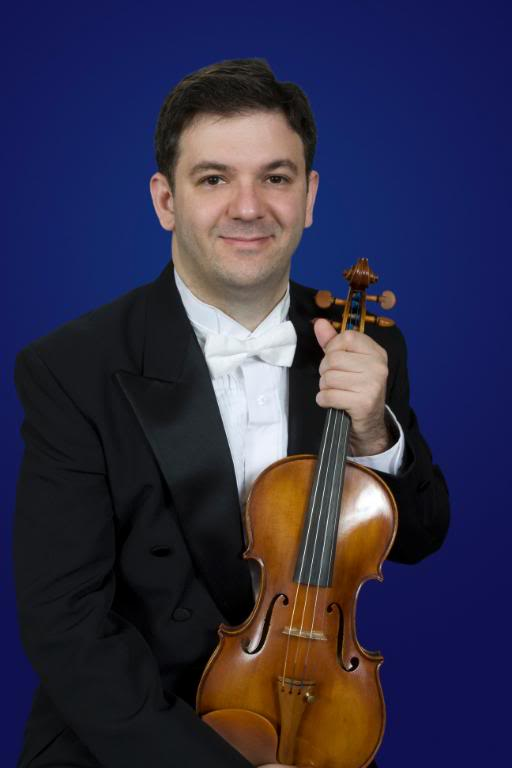
- Born: 6 June 1970 (age 56); Istanbul, Turkey
- Occupations: Violinist, researcher, clinician and conductor
- Website: http://www.selimgiray.com

Selim Giray (/ˈsɛlɪm ɡɪˈreɪ/, Turkish: [seˈlim ɟiˈɾaj]; born 6 June 1970) is a Turkish-American violinist, researcher, clinician and conductor.

== Biography ==
Giray was born in Istanbul, his father is an eminent cellist and scholar, Necati Giray. Giray is director of orchestral studies and Professor of Music at University of Mississippi. Previously, he served as assistant professor of music education and violin pedagogy at Wichita State University School of Music (2012–2015). Between 2007 and 2015, he served as concertmaster of The Ohio Light Opera, where he performed for 20,000 patrons each season and has been featured on eight CDs for Albany Records. Giray served as associate professor of violin, viola and artistic director and conductor of PSU Chamber Orchestra and Southeast Kansas Symphony Orchestra at Pittsburg State University (between 2002–2012). Between 2000 and 2003, Giray taught at Interlochen Arts Camp. As a violinist, Giray has performed extensively in four continents, and has appeared frequently on the radio and television, including the NPR. He has performed as soloist, recitalist, chamber musician, and orchestral player. In 2010, Giray has been appointed Field Editor for the Edwin Mellen Press.

An active clinician, Giray presented at numerous clinics and conferences, including The Midwest Clinic in 2013, and two years earlier, at the American String Teachers Association's National Conference. Most recently, Giray's article titled "To Tilt or Not to Tilt" appeared in the November 2013 issue of American String Teacher—the peer reviewed quarterly journal of the American String Teachers Association. Previously, Giray has interviewed Eliot Chapo for The Strad (July 2010). Also, he recorded a CD, titled Turkish Music for Violin & Piano for ERMMedia with pianist Dr. June Chun-Young (2010, distributed by Naxos). In addition, he edited Adnan Saygun's violin concerto for the Peermusic Classical Europe. In 2003, Edwin Mellen Press published Giray's treatise, titled "A Biography of the Turkish Composer Ahmed Adnan Saygun and a Discussion of his Violin Works". The Ministry of Culture of Turkey published the same work in Turkish, with a preface by then Minister of Culture, Istemihan Talay.

In 2026, Giray conducted Georgia All-State 11–12 Grade String Orchestra, and in 2024, he conducted the California All-State High School String Orchestra. In 2016, Giray has performed the world premiere of Charles Edward Horsley's violin concerto (Op. 29, 1849) with University of Arkansas Symphony Orchestra under the direction of Robert K. Mueller. In 2014, Giray performed for the Australian Embassy in Washington, D.C., at the residence of the ambassador of Australia. Performed a violin recital with Dr. Özgür Ünaldı (Semifinalist at Chopin International Piano Competition in Rome, and Second Prize winner at International Johannes Brahms Piano Competition in Pörtschach, Austria) at Istanbul Technical University, Istanbul International Spectral Music Conference, and Uludağ University, Conservatory of Music, in Bursa, Turkey. During the summers of 2008 and 2013, he visited Asunción, Paraguay for master classes and performances as soloist and conductor. Giray performed at the 34th International Istanbul Music Festival as a member of Istanbul Chamber Orchestra. Also, he played as Acting Concertmaster of Istanbul Chamber Orchestra in Islamabad, Pakistan, where he performed in front of an elite audience of foreign dignitaries. During that trip, Giray gave lectures and master classes at Istanbul Technical University, Bilkent University, and Yıldız University in Turkey, and Edison Academy in Germany.

As a doctoral candidate at the Florida State University, Giray studied with Eliot Chapo, former Concertmaster of such orchestras as the New York Philharmonic and the Dallas Symphony. Prior to that, in 1992 he was awarded a joint fellowship from the North Carolina Symphony Orchestra and East Carolina University, where he studied with Fritz Gearhart. A native of Istanbul, Giray graduated from Istanbul State Conservatory and Mimar Sinan University State Conservatory, where he studied with Saim Akçıl.

During his tenure at Pittsburg State University, Giray has recruited international students, including Paraguay, Romania, China, South Korea, and Turkey. Within the years his students won numerous competitions, including various Concerto-Aria and Chamber Music Competitions, and the coveted American String Teachers Association Solo Competition—Winner of 2006 Kansas Chapter. Giray’s students have been accepted in graduate programs at Yale University, Rice University, the University of Oklahoma, the University of Missouri - Kansas City and The Florida State University with assistantships. Some are members of orchestras including the Youth Orchestra of the Americas, the Civic Orchestra of Chicago, the Kansas City Symphony, the Houston Symphony, the Detroit Symphony, and the Chicago Symphony.

== CD recordings ==
- "Dream City & The Magic Knight." Ohio Light Opera Selim Giray, Concertmaster (Albany: Albany Records, 2014 [TROY1541-42]).
- "H.M.S. Pinafore." Ohio Light Opera Selim Giray, Concertmaster (Albany: Albany Records, 2013 [TROY1459-60]).
- "The Pirates of Penzance." Ohio Light Opera Selim Giray, Concertmaster (Albany: Albany Records, 2011 [TROY1331-32]).
- "The Fortune Teller." Ohio Light Opera Selim Giray, Concertmaster (Albany: Albany Records, 2011 [TROY1326-27]).
- "Turkish Music for Violin and Piano." Selim Giray, violin; June Chun-Young, piano (Norfolk: ERMMedia, 2010 [ERM7101]).
- "Patience." Ohio Light Opera Selim Giray, Concertmaster (Albany: Albany Records, 2010 [TROY1241-42]).
- "El Capitan." Ohio Light Opera Selim Giray, Concertmaster (Albany: Albany Records, 2010 [TROY1236-37]).
- "Mlle. Modiste." Ohio Light Opera Selim Giray, Concertmaster (Albany: Albany Records, 2009 [TROY1146-47]).
- "Ruddigore." Ohio Light Opera Selim Giray, Concertmaster (Albany: Albany Records, 2009 [TROY1164-65]).

== Books, editions and articles ==
- Fundamentals of Instrumental and Choral Conducting, with Michael Hanawalt (New York: Routledge, 2025).
- String Methods for Beginners, (New York: Routledge, 2020).
- "Common Core to Common Score: Implementing the Common Core State Standards in Orchestra Classes" with Steve Oare in the American String Teacher 68 (1) (February 2018): 30–34.
- "The Youth Symphony Orchestra of Santa Cruz Sierra Orquesta Sinfonica Juvenil in Twelve Questions" in Kansas Music Review, 79 (3). URL: http://kansasmusicreview.com/2017/03/05/the-youth-symphony-orchestra-of-santa-cruz-sierra-orquesta-sinfonica-juvenil-in-twelve-questions/
- "The Many Sides of Setup, Part II: Instrument Setup Related Issues" with Kasia Bugaj in the American String Teacher 66 (4) (November 2016): 18–21.
- "The Many Sides of Setup, Part I: Rehearsal Room Related Issues" with Kasia Bugaj in the American String Teacher 66 (3) (August 2016): 42–45.
- "Redefining Music Literacy: Common Core to Common Score" with Steve Oare and Elaine Bernstorf in Contemporary Research in Music Learning Across the Lifespan: Music Education and Human Development, ed. Jennifer A. Bugos (New York; London: Routledge, 2017).
- "Collé Action" with Jacob M. Dakon in the American String Teacher 65 (3) (August 2015): 32–35.
- "To Tilt or Not to Tilt" in the American String Teacher 63 (4) (November 2013): 36–40.
- "Utilize Your Technical String Knowledge to Improve Your Conducting" in the American String Teacher 62 (1) (February 2012): 44–47.
- Interview of Eliot Chapo in The Strad 121 (July 2010): 69.
- A. Adnan Saygun Violin Concerto Op. 44, (Hamburg: Peermusic Classical, 2008). Piano reduction by John C. Ross.
- A Biography of the Turkish Composer Ahmed Adnan Saygun and a Discussion of his Violin Works. (Lewiston, N.Y.: Edwin Mellen Press, 2003). With a preface by Evin İlyasoğlu.
- Ahmed Adnan Saygun’un Keman Yapıtları: Bir Kemancıya Rehber [Ahmed Adnan Saygun’s Violin Works: a Violinist's Handbook], (Ankara: Ministry of Culture Publications, 2002). With a preface by the Minister of Culture of Turkey, M. İstemihan Talay.

== Contributions as field editor ==
- Jessie Wright Martin. The Operettas of Emmerich Kalman. (Lewiston, N.Y.: Edwin Mellen Press, 2014). With a foreword by Michael Miller.

== Bibliography ==
- Emre Aracı. "Carnegie Hall'da Mehtaplı Bir Gece [A Moonlit Night at the Carnegie Hall]," in Andante 68 (April 2012): 52–57.
- Erman Türkili. "Oku İzle Dinle [Read, Watch, Listen]," in NeoFilarmoni 7 (February 2012): 44–45.
- Emre Aracı. "Kansas'tan New York'a Türk Müziğinin Elçileri [The Ambassadors of Turkish Music from Kansas to New York]," in Kayıp Seslerin İzinde (YKY 2011): 165–171.
- Emre Aracı. "Kansas'tan New York'a Türk Müziğinin Elçileri [The Ambassadors of Turkish Music from Kansas to New York]," in Andante 47 (June 2010): 66–69.
- Emre Aracı. "Giray ve Ross'un yeni Saygun keman konçertosu edisyonu [The New Saygun Violin Concerto Edition by Giray and Ross]," in Andante 37 (December 2008 – January 2009): 96–97.
