= The Elected Member =

Book

- First edition cover
- Author: Bernice Rubens
- Language: English
- Publisher: Eyre & Spottiswoode
- Publication date: 1969
- Publication place: Wales
- Media type: Print (hardback & paperback)

The Elected Member is a novel by Welsh writer Bernice Rubens. It won the Booker Prize for Fiction in 1970.

== Plot ==
The novel's main character is Norman Zweck, who is addicted to amphetamines and is convinced that he sees silverfish wherever he goes. The novel opens with Norman’s madness and gradually the story of his immediate Jewish family is told. It is riven with tragedy and secrets.

== Awards ==
The Elected Member won the 1970 Booker Prize. This made Rubens the first woman (and as of 2021, the only Welsh author) to win the prize.
