= A Solitary Grief =

1991 novel by Bernice Rubens

- First edition
- Author: Bernice Rubens
- Publisher: Sinclair Stevenson Ltd
- Publication date: 6 May 1991
- Pages: 240
- ISBN: 978-1-85619-057-2

A Solitary Grief (1991) is a novel by Bernice Rubens about a Harley Street doctor who cannot cope with his own life. Increasingly alienated from his wife and daughter, he also considers himself unable to help his patients any longer and decides to start a new life together with a newly found friend. However, his hopes are again shattered, which eventually leads to catastrophe.

== Plot summary ==
The novel opens with psychiatrist Dr Alistair Crown's wife Virginia giving birth to the couple's first child. Crown, who is not present during birth, is informed immediately afterwards that their daughter Doris has Down's syndrome, a fact he is unable to accept. For the next five years, he avoids Doris's face: He never looks at her and he refuses to be shown photos of her. His idea of being close to his daughter consists in his nocturnal visits to her bedroom when she is fast asleep: Then he gropes around under the sheets — in a harmless way, imagining what it would be like to have a normal child and envisaging the day when he will actually come face to face with her.

However, he keeps postponing that day, telling himself and his wife that he is not ready for it yet. He leaves for work early in the morning and comes home at night when his daughter is already asleep. He does not tell his parents, who live abroad, that their granddaughter is disabled and, for years, can persuade them not to visit. Although Virginia is a devoted mother and an understanding wife, the ensuing marital crisis is unavoidable. When Doris is of preschool age, Crown actually has to lock himself in his room so as to make sure that he does not accidentally see his daughter's face. After a brief fling with a former girlfriend he moves out of the house.

His life takes a decisive turn when he meets a man who calls himself Esau. Esau, who has a very hairy body, is still suffering under his dominant father although the latter has been dead for some time. He has become a compulsive stripper, making appointments with doctors, dentists and masseurs only to perform his stripping routine in front of them and wait for their reaction. The two men strike up an asexual friendship, and Crown moves into Esau's large house. Although he realizes that Esau is in urgent need of psychiatric treatment, Crown just sees a friend in him and refuses to have any therapeutic influence on Esau. He is devastated when Esau commits suicide by hanging himself in the attic.

Now Crown's life totally gets out of control. Early one morning a few days before Doris's fifth birthday he kidnaps her from the playground of her nursery school — still without looking at her —, drives with her to Hyde Park, strangles her from behind and buries her face down under a tree in a shallow grave dug out with his bare hands. Back at his office, he is informed by his wife that Doris has gone missing. For a couple of days, the police search for the girl but then give up all hope of ever finding her alive and well. When soon afterwards her body is found, Crown has to accompany the police to the morgue to identify his daughter. This is when he comes face to face with her for the first — and last — time.

The police never solve the crime. Some time later Crown hangs himself in the garage.
