= Florence Ashton Marshall =

English writer, composer and conductor (1843–1922)

Florence Ashton Marshall (Mrs Julian Marshall) née Thomas (30 March 1843 – 5 March 1922) was an English composer, conductor and author.

== Life ==
She was born on 30 March 1843 in Rome, Italy, the daughter of Vicar Canon Thomas of All Hallows Barking by the Tower. Her sisters were the novelist Bertha Thomas (author of The Violin Player, 1880) and the clarinettist Frances Thomas (after 1843-1925). She studied (from the age of 30) at the Royal Academy of Music with William Sterndale Bennett, John Goss and G.A. Macfarren.

Thomas married the businessman, writer, and music collector Julian Marshall on 7 October 1864 and had three daughters. She contributed to Grove's Dictionary, although to a lesser degree than her husband, and published a set of 70 Solfège exercises in 1885. Her most successful composition, with a libretto by her sister Bertha, was the operetta Prince Sprite for treble voices, written in 1891 while she was Head of Music at Dulwich School and published by Novello. She later went on to help found a music school, the Hampstead Conservatoire.

She was elected an associate of the Philharmonic Society and conducted the South Hampstead Orchestra for over 30 years. The orchestra was substantial enough to perform a Brahms symphony under her direction and the Saint-Saëns violin concerto with Mischa Elman as the soloist. She and her husband were founding members of the Musical Association.

Marshall died on 5 March 1922.

== Works ==
Florence Marshall composed solo songs, part songs, educational pieces, and operettas. Selected works include:

- Symphony in B minor (Andante performed in 1874)
- Notturno for Orchestra (1875)
- Sweet and Low, song (words Tennyson, 1877)
- The Masked Shepherd, operetta (libretto Edwin Simpson-Baikie, 1879)
  - 'Behold the sun in gold descending' (partsong from The Masked Shepherd)
- Piano Trio (1879)
- Ask Me No More, song (words Tennyson, 1880)
- Rest hath come, partsong (words Leyland Leigh, 1884)
- To sea! the calm is o’er, partsong (words T.L Beddoes, 1884)
- Choral Dances, stage work (1897)
- Prince Sprite, fairy operetta (libretto Bertha Thomas, 1897)
- Hohenlinden, choral (1892)
- Nocturne for clarinet and orchestra

Under the name Mrs Julian Marshall she published a biography of Handel in Hueffer's Great Musicians series in 1883, and Life and Letters of Mary Wollstonecraft Shelley in 1889.
