= Madame Sousatzka =

1988 film by John Schlesinger

- Theatrical release poster
- Directed by: John Schlesinger
- Written by: Ruth Prawer Jhabvala; John Schlesinger
- Based on: Madame Sousatzka by Bernice Rubens
- Produced by: Robin Dalton
- Starring: Shirley MacLaine; Peggy Ashcroft; Shabana Azmi; Twiggy; Leigh Lawson; Geoffrey Bayldon; Navin Chowdhry
- Cinematography: Nat Crosby
- Edited by: Peter Honess
- Music by: Gerald Gouriet
- Production company: Cineplex Odeon Films
- Distributed by: Curzon Film Distributors
- Release dates: 14 October 1988 (United States); 21 March 1989 (London)
- Running time: 122 minutes
- Countries: United Kingdom; Canada
- Language: English
- Budget: $5 million
- Box office: $3.5 million

Madame Sousatzka is a 1988 drama film directed by John Schlesinger and starring Shirley MacLaine, with a screenplay by Ruth Prawer Jhabvala. It is based upon the 1962 novel of the same name by Bernice Rubens.

== Plot ==
Indian immigrant Sushila Sen lives in London with her son Manek, who is musically gifted. She supports them both as a caterer of Indian food, while Manek studies the piano with Madame Sousatzka, who is a Russian-American immigrant. Madame Sousatzka, while highly talented, never succeeded as a pianist and thus lives through her students, particularly talented ones such as Manek. Manek is soon forced to choose between Madame Sousatzka and his mother, who both compete for his attention.

The Russian pianist and teacher Madame Maria Levinskaya (died 1960) inspired the character of Madame Sousatzka. The plot is based on the experiences of Harold Rubens, a child prodigy pianist who began lessons with Levinskaya from the age of seven (in 1925) and became her star pupil.

== Cast ==
- Shirley MacLaine as Madame Sousatzka
- Navin Chowdhry as Manek
- Shabana Azmi as Sushila
- Peggy Ashcroft as Lady Emily
- Robert Rietty as Leo Milev
- Twiggy as Jenny
- Leigh Lawson as Ronnie
- Lee Montague as Vincent Pick

== Production ==
Literary agent Robin Dalton took 18 years to get the film made. Vanessa Redgrave was originally scheduled to be the lead before MacLaine joined the production.

== Release ==
The film was released in U.S. theaters by Universal Pictures on 14 October 1988.

The film was selected for the Royal Film Performance which was held on 20 March 1989 at the Odeon Leicester Square in London, attended by Queen Elizabeth the Queen Mother and Princess Margaret, Countess of Snowdon. It opened to the public in the U.K. on 21 March 1989 at the Curzon West End. It was the first film in the U.K. to be released with a 12 certificate after Curzon asked Westminster City Council to use the new rating for its release in the West End of London.

=== Home media ===
The movie was released on videocassette in the U.S. by MCA Home Video in 1989. The movie was released on DVD in the U.S. by Universal Studios Home Entertainment under their Vault Series banner on 28 August 2014.

A region 2 DVD was released by Network in 2007 (catalogue nr. 7952723). The extras are a trailer and some production stills.

== Reception ==
On the review aggregator website Rotten Tomatoes, 78% of 18 critics' reviews are positive.

== Accolades ==
Award	Category	Recipient(s)	Result
British Academy Film Awards	Best Actress in a Supporting Role	Peggy Ashcroft	Nominated
David di Donatello Awards	Best Foreign Actress	Shirley MacLaine	Nominated
Golden Globe Awards	Best Actress in a Motion Picture – Drama	Shirley MacLaine	Won (Note: Tied with Jodie Foster for The Accused and Sigourney Weaver for Gorillas in the Mist.)
Golden Globe Awards	Best Original Score – Motion Picture	Gerald Gouriet	Nominated
Retirement Research Foundation Awards	Television and Theatrical Film Fiction	Robin Dalton	Nominated
USC Scripter Awards		Ruth Prawer Jhabvala (screenwriter); Bernice Rubens (author)	Nominated
Venice Film Festival	Golden Lion	John Schlesinger	Nominated
Venice Film Festival	Best Actress	Shirley MacLaine	Won (Note: Tied with Isabelle Huppert for Story of Women.)
