= Un été à quatre mains =

2017 novel by Gaëlle Josse

- Author: Gaëlle Josse
- Language: French
- Publisher: Editions Ateliers Henri Dougier
- Publication date: March 23, 2017
- Publication place: France
- Media type: Print
- ISBN: 9791031202587

Un été à quatre mains is a French historical fiction novel by Gaëlle Josse about Franz Schubert.

The novel gives a fictionalized account of the time Schubert spent at Zseliz with the Esterházy family during the summer of 1828, and of his alleged unrequited love for the young countess Caroline von Esterházy.
