= Bertha Thomas =

English author (1845–1918)

Bertha Thomas (19 March 1845 – 24 August 1918), was a Victorian pro-feminist writer, author of the 1880 novel The Violin Player.

== Life ==
Thomas was born on 19 March 1845 at Shelsley Beauchamp in Worcestershire. Her father was Canon John Thomas (died 1883), and her sisters were the composer Florence Ashton Marshall and the professional clarinettist Frances Thomas.

She moved to London in the 1880s, initially living with her father and her sister Frances at 16 Gordon Square, Bloomsbury, until the father's death in 1883. She completed seven novels, many of which were serialized in London Society, and which became popular in the circulating libraries. There were also short stories, other writings and articles that were published in periodicals in the UK and the US. A collection of her short stories was re-issued in 2008. Like her sister Frances, Bertha remained unmarried.

== Work ==
The 1880 novel The Violin-Player has been described as "perhaps the most triumphant narrative of female musicality in Victorian literature". Her 1875 booklet Latest Intelligence from the Planet Venus, first published in Fraser’s Magazine, presented a satirical argument against giving women the vote. In The Son of the House (1900), a mother imprisons her son under the guise of insanity to protect the family inheritance - a subversion of The Madwoman in the Attic Victorian trope of an insane woman controlled by her male relatives.

Thomas also wrote the libretto for her sister Florence's operetta Prince Sprite in 1891, published by Novello.

== Bibliography ==
- Proud Maisie, novel (published anonymously, 1877)
- Cressida, novel (1878)
- The Violin-Player, novel (1880)
- In a Cathedral City (1882)
- Life of Richard Wagner (Elzevir Library, 1883, translation of biography by Carl Friedrich Glasenapp)
- Famous Women: George Sand (Eminent Women Series, 1883, rev. 1889)
- Ichabod: A Portrait, novel (1885)
- Elizabeth's Fortune, novel (1887)
- Famous or Infamous, novel (1890)
- Sundorne, novel (1890)
- The House on the Scar: A Tale of South Devon (1890)
- Camera Lucida: or, Strange Passages in Common Life, short stories (1897)
- The Son of the House, novel (1900)
- Picture Tales from the Welsh Hills, short stories (1912) (reprinted as Stranger Within The Gates (2008)
