= Bernice Rubens =

Welsh novelist (1923–2004)

- Born: July 26, 1923; Splott, Cardiff, Wales
- Died: 13 October 2004 (aged 81)
- Education: Cardiff High School for Girls; Cardiff University
- Occupation: Novelist
- Spouse: Rudolf Nassauer
- Relatives: Harold Rubens (brother)
- Writing career
- Language: English
- Genre: Novel
- Notable awards: Booker Prize

Bernice Rubens (26 July 1923 – 13 October 2004) was a Welsh novelist. She became the first woman to win the Booker Prize in 1970, for The Elected Member.

== Personal life ==
Bernice Ruth Reuben was born in Splott, Cardiff, Wales, on 26 July 1923 (though her obituary in The Independent notes that "she later said 1928", and several sources report her birth date as 26 July 1928), the third of four children of Eli Reuben and his wife Dorothy, née Cohen. Her father was a Lithuanian Jew who, at the age of 16, left mainland Europe in 1900 in the hope of starting a new life in New York City. Due to being swindled by a ticket tout, he never reached the United States, his passage taking him no further than Cardiff. He decided to stay in Wales, and there he met and married Dorothy Cohen, whose Polish Jewish family had also emigrated to Cardiff.

Bernice was one of four children and came from a musical family, both her brothers, Harold and Cyril, becoming well-known classical musicians. Her sister Beryl was a prestigious viola and violin teacher. Harold was forced to quit playing through illness, but Cyril (1926-1996) became a violinist in the London Symphony Orchestra. Bernice failed to follow in her family's musical tradition, though she would later learn the cello. She was educated at Cardiff High School for Girls and later read English at the University of Wales, Cardiff, where she was awarded her BA degree in 1947.

She married Rudolf Nassauer, a wine merchant who also wrote poetry and fiction. They had two daughters, Rebecca and Sharon. From 1950 to 1955, Rubens taught at a grammar school in Birmingham, before moving on to the film industry, where she made documentaries. In the 1960s, the poet Jon Silkin rented the attic storey of their London house and sublet rooms to David Mercer, later a prolific West End and TV playwright, and Malcolm Ross-Macdonald, later an equally prolific writer of historical novels.

A chain smoker all her life, Rubens began to suffer from ill-health in the late 1990s. She died in the Royal Free Hospital, London, from stroke combined with chronic bronchitis, "a classic illness of smokers", on 13 October 2004, aged 81 (generally reported as 76).

== Professional career as a writer ==
Rubens' first novel, Set On Edge, was published in 1960. In 1970, she became the first woman to win the Booker Prize (the second year of the prize's existence), for her novel The Elected Member. As of 2024, Rubens is still the only Welsh author to have won the Booker Prize.

Throughout her life, Rubens ensured that she wrote every single day.

In June 2024, a Purple Plaque was installed on the house that was her family's home in Roath.

== Adaptations ==
Her 1962 novel, Madame Sousatzka, was made into a film in 1988, with Shabana Azmi and Shirley MacLaine. This book was based on the experiences of her brother Harold Rubens, a child prodigy pianist, and his teacher Madame Maria Levinskaya (died 1960) who inspired the character of Madame Sousatzka. Harold Rubens was born in Cardiff in 1918, and studied with Levinskaya from the age of seven. The musical Sousatzka was produced in Toronto in 2017. It was intended to be a pre-Broadway tryout for controversial producer Garth Drabinsky. Victoria Clark portrayed the title role.

Her 1975 novel, I Sent a Letter To My Love, was made into a film (Chère inconnue) in 1980 by Moshe Mizraki, starring Simone Signoret and Jean Rochefort.

Her 1985 novel, Mr Wakefield's Crusade, was adapted for television by the BBC in 1992, starring Peter Capaldi and Michael Maloney.

== Works ==
- Set on Edge (1960)
- Madame Sousatzka (1962) (filmed as Madame Sousatzka)
- Mate in Three (1966)
- Chosen People (1969)
- The Elected Member (1969) (Booker Prize for Fiction 1970)
- Sunday Best (1971)
- Go Tell the Lemming (1973)
- I Sent a Letter To My Love (1975)
- The Ponsonby Post (1977)
- A Five-Year Sentence (1978)
- Spring Sonata (1979)
- Birds of Passage (1981)
- Brothers (1983)
- Mr Wakefield's Crusade (1985)
- Our Father (1987)
- Kingdom Come (1990)
- A Solitary Grief (1991)
- Mother Russia (1992)
- Autobiopsy (1993)
- Hijack (1993)
- Yesterday in the Back Lane (1995)
- The Waiting Game (1997)
- I, Dreyfus (1999)
- Milwaukee (2001)
- Nine Lives (2002)
- The Sergeants' Tale (2003)
- When I Grow Up (2005)
