= Rudolf Nassauer =

German novelist and wine merchant

Rudolf Nassauer (8 November 1924 – 5 December 1996) was a German novelist and wine merchant best known as the author of The Hooligan (1960), a novel which explores the nuances of Nazi psychology by following protagonist Andreas Felber as he transforms from the Head Clerk of his local Town Council into the deputy commandant of a concentration camp. Nassauer also wrote the novels The Cuckoo (1962) and Kramer’s Goats (1986), among others.

== Life ==
=== Early life ===
Nassauer was born on 8 November 1924, to a wealthy family of Jewish wine merchants in Frankfurt, Germany. His father and sister fled to London after Kristallnacht, leaving Nassauer and his mother to settle the family’s business affairs before they, too, escaped to England in 1939. Known as Rudi by his friends and family, Nassauer attended St. Paul’s School in London before taking over the family business, Nassauer Bros., which specialized in the trade of German wine.

=== Marriage to Bernice Rubens ===
In 1947, Nassauer married Welsh novelist Bernice Rubens, with whom he had three children. The couple became friends with various writers and intellectuals including Elias Canetti, Peter Vansitta, and Angus Wilson. During this time, Nassauer continued to work as a wine merchant and wrote fiction during his free time.

Nassauer and Rubens became divorced in 1967, though they remained close friends.

=== Career and later life ===
In 1960, Nassauer published his first novel, The Hooligan, on which he had spent the previous decade working. He continued to write and run Nassauer Bros. until the company went out of business, at which point he became the director of the wine importer and distributor Ehrmanns, where he worked until his retirement in 1991. Nassauer was also a generous patron of the arts and developed a friendship with Portuguese painter Paula Rego.

He died in London on 5 December 1996.

== Literary works ==
Peter Owen of The Independent called Nassauer, "an underrated writer whose most important work, The Hooligan, the first in-depth analysis of Nazi psychology, became a Sixties cult book."

One edition of The Hooligan features an introduction by Michael Moorcock.

=== Bibliography ===
- Poems
- The Hooligan (1960)
- The Cuckoo (1962)
- The Examination (1973)
- Agents of Love (1976)
- Kramer’s Goats (1986)
