= Harold Rubens =

Welsh pianist and activist (1918–2010)

Harold Rubens (1918–2010) was a Welsh pianist and anti-apartheid activist.

== Early life ==
Born in 1918 in Cardiff, Wales, the son of Eli and Molly Reuben, practising Orthodox Jews of Latvian origin, Harold was the eldest of four siblings, all of whom were musical. By the age of 10, he was winning piano prizes and performing with, for example, the Scottish Symphony Orchestra under George Szell.

At the age of seven having, according to his sister Bernice Rubens, "exhausted all the local teachers", Harold began travelling to London to study with Madame Maria Levinskaya. Bernice, a Booker Prize-winning novelist, would use his study with Madame Levinskaya as the subject of her book, Madame Sousatzka, which subsequently became a film with Shirley MacLaine in the title role.

Rubens' performing skills were diminished by illness, after which he concentrated on teaching.

== Later life ==
After a stay in the US, Rubens moved to South Africa in the 1950s and become involved in the anti-apartheid movement. While teaching at the South African College of Music in Cape Town, he was the first musician to refuse to play to segregated audiences; during the ANC Treason Trial (1956–1961) he played high-profile concerts to raise money for ANC defendants; and his home in Newlands became a meeting place for other movement members, including Nelson Mandela and Albie Sachs, who recalled:

We were meeting in the underground in their cottage in Newlands. We would hear him practising the fourth Beethoven piano concerto, going over it and over and over again while we were doing our secret planning in the room next door. Happily the music was very loud, and if there were any bugs, all the security police would hear would be Beethoven and not us planning resistance to apartheid.

— Albie Sachs

Rubens returned from South Africa to the UK in 1963, taking up a position teaching at the Royal Academy of Music, London. He died in 2010, at his home in London.
