= Constance Warren (composer) =

English composer and piano teacher

Constance Jessie Warren (12 August 1905 – 16 October 1984) was an English composer and piano teacher.

Warren was born in Sparkhill, Yardley, near Birmingham. Her mother Jessie was a professional pianist. Constance studied piano with the Russian pianist Maria Levinskaya in London, and also with Clifford Curzon (who was two years her junior). She attended the Royal Academy of Music under York Bowen and Benjamin Dale.

All of Warren's compositions date from her student days at the Royal Academy, which she left in 1932, returning to Birmingham to teach at the Birmingham School of Music and Birmingham Conservatoire. Her pupils there included the composer Brian Ferneyhough and the Birmingham Contemporary Music Group principal pianist Malcolm Wilson. Heather Hill for string orchestra has been recorded. Other larger scale works include a Nocturne for orchestra, performed by Henry Wood, and a String Quartet in B minor, performed by the Griller Quartet.

The majority of her pieces are miniatures. Duncan Honeybourne has recorded her Idyll in G-Flat Major (1930) in which, he says, "an intense chromaticism lends an emotional depth and ambiguity to the thematic material". Others include the Prelude in A minor for piano, a Lament and a Ballade for cello and piano and the Two Miniatures for flute and piano.
