= Maria Levinskaya =

British pianist and educator

Maria Epstein Levinskaya (born circa 1885 – 6 August, 1960), often known as Madame Levinskaya, was a Russian pianist, a pupil of Vasily Safonov at the Moscow Conservatory. But she also worked with many other teachers - 19 in all, including Leopold Godowsky in Berlin, Isidor Philipp in Paris and Tobias Matthay in London - "some celebrated, others obscure, from whom I tried to glean a ray of light". She made her debut as a pianist in Cologne in 1913, appeared in England as a soloist under Henry Wood, Dan Godfrey and others, and set up her own piano school in London in 1925.

In 1919 Levinskaya was charged with stealing a cloak worth £8 18s 6d from the Marshall & Snelgrove department store in Vere Street, but was later acquitted.

== Socialite and teacher ==
From the early 1920s until the late 1930s Levinskaya enjoyed a very high profile, both musically and socially. She taught piano, performed recitals and gave educational lectures from her studios at No. 50 and later No. 2 Leinster Gardens, London W2. These musical "at homes" soon became famous.

The Welsh novelist Bernice Rubens used her as the model for Madame Sousatzka in the 1962 novel (and subsequent film) of the same name. The book was based on the experiences of her brother Harold Rubens, a child prodigy pianist who began lessons with Levinskaya from the age of seven (in 1925) and became her star pupil. The English composer pianist Constance Warren was also a pupil.

== The Levinskaya System ==
With Arthur Rubinstein and Vasily Safonov she helped establish the Russian school of piano playing, emphasising arm weight alongside older finger techniques. She published the Levinskaya System of Piano Technique and Tone Colour in 1930. According to Robert Palmieri the Levinskaya System incorporated the weight relaxation principles first put forth by Rudolf Maria Breithaupt. She followed scientific and physiological research, and came up with a method of eliminating musician's cramp.

== Marriage and later life ==
She married George Antonoff, a Russian doctor of science from Manchester University, at the Paddington Registry Office on 20 December, 1935. In May 1939 she moved to America with her husband, who became a chemist at Fordham University, New York, from where he corresponded with Albert Einstein. Levinskaya and her husband are said to have embraced Islam. She died in New York in August 1960.
