= Elizabeth Sara Sheppard =

British novelist, linguist, poet, musician

Elizabeth Sara Sheppard (1826 – 13 March 1862) was a 19th-century British novelist.

== Life ==
Sheppard was born in 1826 in Blackheath, London. Her father, John Sheppard, of Jewish descent on his mother's side, was a clergyman of the Church of England. Sheppard taught music in the school that her mother had opened. In addition to being a musician, Sheppard was an accomplished linguist in Latin, Greek, Hebrew, French, and German. She died on 13 March 1862 in Brixton, London.

== Writing career ==
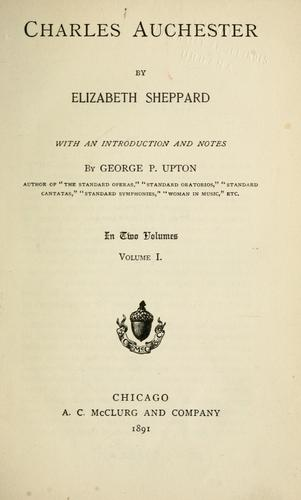
Charles Auchester by Elizabeth Sheppard was published in Chicago in 1891

She began her most notable novel, Charles Auchester, at age sixteen. Benjamin Disraeli, a British conservative politician and author, who served twice as Prime Minister, agreed to help Sheppard. He not only recommended her book to his own publisher, but he also wrote to the aspiring writer, saying, "No greater book will ever be written upon music, and it will one day be recognised as the imaginative classic of divine art." Charles Auchester was published in 1853 as a three-volume novel. It was dedicated to Disraeli as "the author of Contarini Fleming" (his autobiographical novel of 1832). Sheppard later dedicated another one of her three volume novels, Counterparts, or the Cross of Love, to Mrs. Disraeli in 1854. Sheppard's writing was modeled after Disraeli's, and, like him, she used real characters in her novels.

Sheppard's novels have musical influences. Charles Auchester, a musical romance, was a memorial to the composer Felix Mendelssohn. Rumour: A Novel incorporates Beethoven as a character named "Rodomant." This character features traits, including a short-tempered nature, belief in iconoclasm, and eventual deafness, attributed to Beethoven.

The name "E. Berger" appeared as a nom de plume on the title page of Charles Auchester, although it was initially published without an acknowledged author. This was a translation of Sheppard into French. Sheppard wrote under this pseudonym for some years. She first received praise in America before gaining recognition in her homeland. However, comments on her work were not always complimentary.

== Publications ==
- Charles Auchester 1853.
- Counterparts or the Cross of Love 1854.
- My First Season by Beatrice Reynolds, edited by Sheppard. 1855.
- The Double Coronet 1856.
- Rumour: A Novel 1858.
- Almost a Heroine 1859.
