= Gaëlle Josse =

French poet and novelist

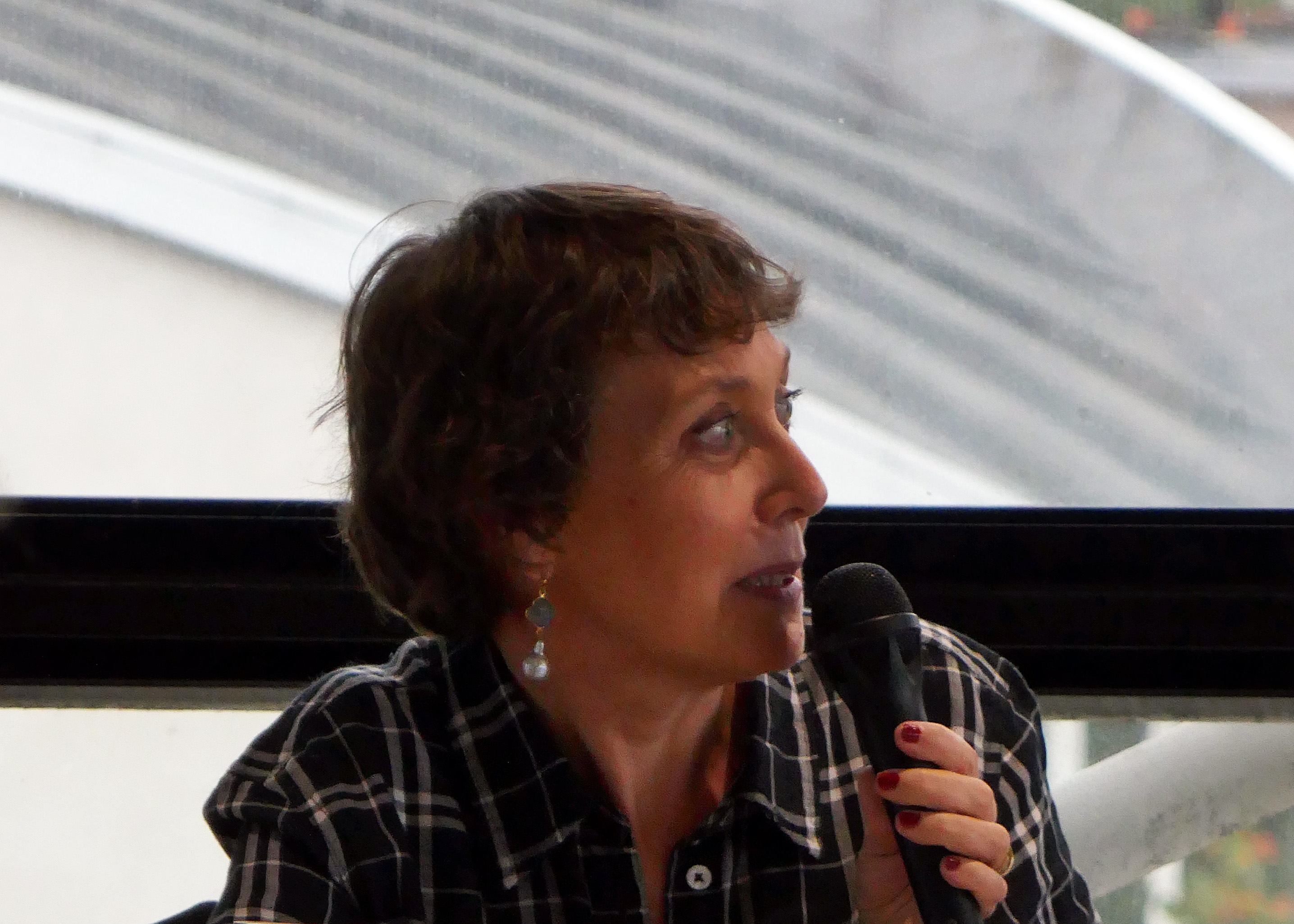
Gaelle Josse in 2019

Gaelle Josse (born 1960) is a French poet and novelist. She has written four novels till date. She has won a number of literary prizes and her work has been translated into several languages.

== Works ==
- Les heures silencieuses (The Quiet Hours, 2011)
- Nos vies désaccordées (Our Out of Tune Lives, 2012) - 2013 Prix Alain-Fournier
- Noces de neige (Snow Wedding, 2013)
- Le dernier gardien d’Ellis Island (The Last Guardian of Ellis Island) - Grand Livre du Mois Literary Prize, EU Prize for Literature
- L'Ombre de nos nuits (The shadow of our nights, 2016)
- De vives voix. Le temps qu'il fait. (With loud voices. The weather that there is., 2016)
- Un été à quatre mains (A summer for four hands, 2017)
- Vermeer entre deux songes. (Vermeer between two dreams., 2017)
- Une longue impatience (A long impatience, 2018)
- Une femme en contre-jour (A woman against the light, 2019)
- Ce matin-là (That morning, 2021)
- La nuit des pères (The night of the fathers, 2022)
- Et recoudre le soleil (And sew up the sun, 2022)
- À quoi songent-ils, ceux que le sommeil fuit ? (What are those who loose sleep dreaming about?, 2024)
- Le fil entre nos cœurs. (The wire between our hearts., 2024)
- De nos blessures un royaume. (From our wounds a kingdom., 2025)

Formerly a resident of New Caledonia, Josse now lives in Paris.

== Decorations ==
- Chevalier of the Order of Arts and Letters (2016)
