= Contarini Fleming =

Novel by Benjamin Disraeli

Contarini Fleming: A Psychological Autobiography
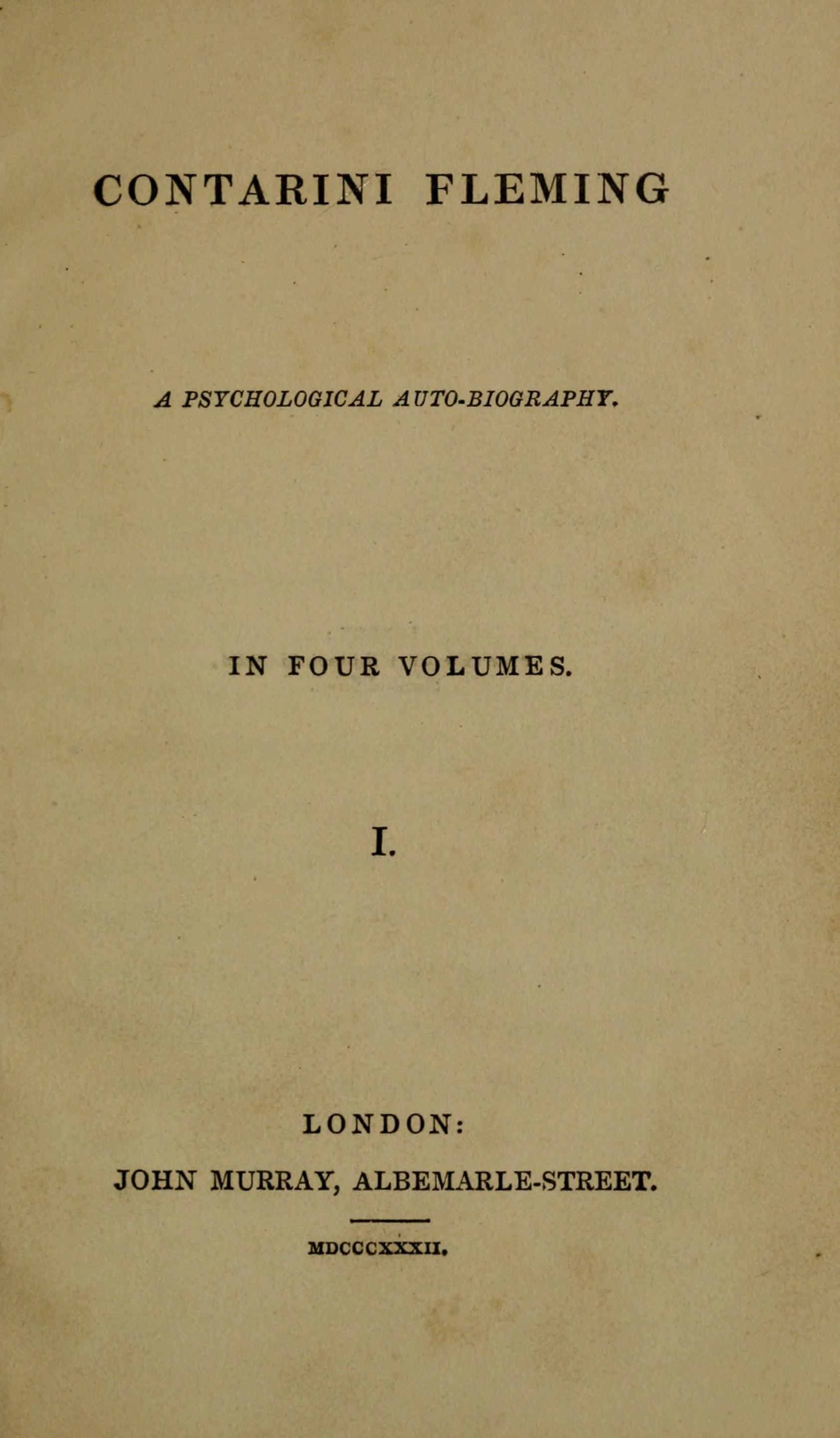
- First edition title page
- Author: Benjamin Disraeli
- Language: English
- Publisher: John Murray
- Publication date: 1832
- Media type: Print

Contarini Fleming: A Psychological Autobiography is the fourth and most autobiographical novel written by Benjamin Disraeli, who would later become a Prime Minister of the United Kingdom. It was published anonymously in May 1832 but despite the author considering it his best novel, was a financial failure.

== Synopsis ==
Contarini Fleming is the only child of a "Saxon nobleman of ancient family" and his Venetian first wife. His mother dies giving birth to him and he takes his first name from the fallen Venetian dynasty of which she was one of the last members. His father Baron Fleming remarries and Contarini becomes withdrawn. On going to college, however, he develops an increasingly outgoing and popular personality on account of his wit before withdrawing again when he realises he wishes to become a great poet. Ruminating on his unhappiness with his first serious literary attempt, he meets a painter in the ruins of a gothic abbey. The painter gives him a book on the history of Venice, which reveals the former pre-eminence there of the Contarinis.

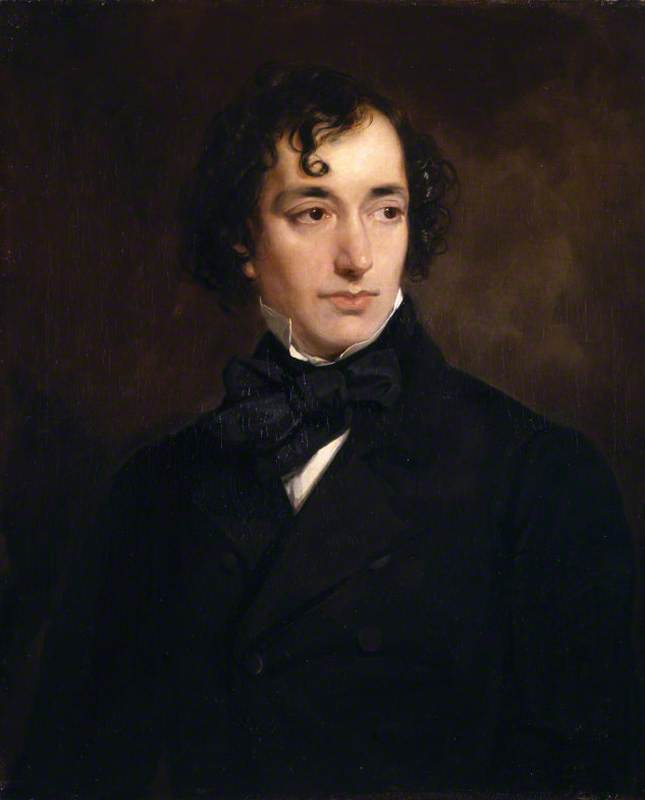
A retrospective portrayal (1852) of Disraeli as a young man when he wrote Contarini Fleming

Contarini therefore resolves to run away to Venice but early on his journey is robbed of his possessions and takes refuge with a woodman and his wife. Their son has been missing for 15 years but returns that evening and turns out not only to be the Chevalier de Winter, a painter of international repute, but also the man Contarini had met in the ruined abbey.

Contarini returns home and discovers that his father is foreign secretary, thus inspiring him to become an international statesman. His father sends him to university where he again initially impresses, this time with his writing, before emerging as the ringleader of a rebellious group who eventually quit the university and set up their home in a disused castle in the middle of a forest. When their antics attract the attention of the police, they all decide to return to their former lives except for Contarini who carries on his travels. He soon meets Christiana, one of his childhood crushes, who is now a countess and stays with her and her husband.

When Christiana rejects Contarini after he declares his undying love, he returns once again to his family and becomes extremely successful as his father’s secretary. When the prime minister dies, Contarini helps to manoeuvre his father to power. As his secretary, Contarini now operates successfully on an international stage and also anonymously publishes a novel. As people come to realise he is the author, Contarini is increasingly embarrassed by this work and resolves to leave the country (an unspecified Scandinavian one). Before he can, however, his father sends him on a diplomatic mission to Paris, as a precursor to going on to England.

From Paris, Contarini diverts to Italy and goes to Venice where he meets and falls in love with his cousin, Alcesté Contarini. As the price for leaving a convent, she had been betrothed to a Venetian nobleman and so she and Contarini elope to Crete. There they are blissfully happy until Alcesté dies giving birth to a stillborn son. Contarini attempts to commit suicide but recovers and derives some artistic inspiration from his recent upheavals. He is, however, unable to satisfactorily convey this inspiration to paper and so suffers a nervous breakdown.

Having been in a catatonic state for some months, Contarini is visited by Winter who inspires him to travel and so he goes on a grand tour taking in Spain, Albania, Athens, Constantinople, Egypt, Syria, Jerusalem and parts of Africa. He resolves to settle in Cairo but on hearing news of his father's illness, travels home. En route he receives news of his father's death, accompanied by a letter from his dying father drawing parallels between their two lives. The novel ends with Contarini settling down in Naples, contemplating involvement in active politics.

== Reception ==
Although Disraeli regarded Contarini Fleming as his best novel, it was a financial failure. Author and publisher shared the profits, amounting to just £18 each. Nevertheless, it was read by the actress and writer Fanny Kemble and was a favourite of the Irish diplomat Lord Strangford.

Literary historians have taken a mixed view of the novel. The New Monthly Magazine pronounced it "a vast improvement on Vivian Grey", and Henry Milman described it as the equal of Childe Harold's Pilgrimage. However, in 1977, referring to Disraeli's intention that the novel reveal the development of his poetic character, Professor Charles Nickerson wrote:

Contarini is full of fine sentiments and painfully contrived expressions; yet little is presented in a way that seems genuinely and deeply felt...The effect is finally one of appalling emptiness.

== Significance ==
Written in the first person, Contarini Fleming is thought to be the most autobiographical of Disraeli's novels. Its principal theme is the author's "internal debate about his future: was his career to be literary or political?" More specifically, Disraeli's difficult relationship with his mother, his unhappy schooldays and "the conquest of a hostile or indifferent world" are all reflected in the novel. Descriptions of Contarini's travels draw heavily from Disraeli's Grand Tour, which he had undertaken in 1830–1. Other experiences Contarini and Disraeli share include a nervous breakdown and embarrassment from an anonymously published novel, in Disraeli's case Vivian Grey.

Although Contarini Fleming lacks any overarching political credo, the author repeatedly criticises the education system and its "museum of verbiage" for their excessive focus on words and grammar (often in dead languages) and not on ideas. He is particularly critical of "moral philosophy", believing that education should be based on "demonstration instead of dogma" and founded upon man's nature. Disraeli also criticises students of politics for trying to identify the best system of government whereas, in his opinion, whatever its systemic nature, government can only be successful by adapting to local people and culture.

== Quotes ==
From a prime ministerial perspective, it refers to cabinet members as being a collection of "secret enemies, necessary tools and tolerated incumbrances". In a forerunner to the style of language Disraeli would deploy when speaking of his great political rival William Gladstone, Contarini refers to an adversary spouting "the most ludicrous medley of pomposity".

Given the autobiographical nature of the work, written before Disraeli was even a member of Parliament, perhaps the most prophetic quote is when Contarini's father, on becoming prime minister of a minor "northern" state, says to him, "My son, you will be Prime Minister of...; perhaps something greater."
