= 1984 in the United Kingdom =

Events from the year 1984 in the United Kingdom. The year was dominated by the miners' strike.

== Incumbents ==
- Monarch – Elizabeth II
- Prime Minister – Margaret Thatcher (Conservative)

== Events ==
=== January ===
- January – General Motors ends production of the Vauxhall Chevette after nine years.
- 1 January – The Bornean Sultanate of Brunei gains full independence from the United Kingdom, having become a British protectorate in 1888.
- 3 January – The FTSE 100 Index starts.
- 6 January – The Society of Motor Manufacturers and Traders announces that a record of nearly 1.8 million cars were sold in Britain last year. The best-selling car for the second year running was the Ford Escort with more than 174,000 sales.
- 9 January – Sarah Tisdall, a 23-year-old Foreign Office clerk, is charged under the Official Secrets Act.
- 13 January – Six people die when Britain is battered by hurricane-force winds.
- 14 January – Six people die during a fire at the Maysfield Leisure Centre in Belfast.
- 15 January – Left-wing MP Tony Benn wins the Labour Party's nomination for the Chesterfield by-election, eight months after losing his seat as Member of parliament (MP) for Bristol in the General Election.
- 25 January – The government prohibits GCHQ staff from belonging to any trade union.

=== February ===
- 1 February
  - Japanese car maker Nissan signs an agreement with the British government to build a car factory in Britain. This landmark deal means that foreign cars will be built in Britain for the first time, with the factory set to open during 1986.
  - Chancellor of the Exchequer Nigel Lawson announces that after 13 years, the halfpenny will be demonetised and withdrawn from circulation.
- 7–19 February – Great Britain and Northern Ireland compete at the Winter Olympics in Sarajevo, Yugoslavia, and win one gold medal.
- 12 February – Austin Rover announces that the Triumph marque will be discontinued this Summer after 63 years, as the Triumph Acclaim's successor will be sold as a Rover.
- 14 February – Torvill and Dean win a gold medal for ice skating at the Winter Olympics.

=== March ===
- 1 March – Labour MP Tony Benn is returned to parliament after winning the Chesterfield by-election, having lost his previous seat at the general election last year.
- 2 March – Just five months after becoming Labour Party leader, Neil Kinnock's ambition of becoming prime minister at the next election (due to be held by June 1988) are given a boost when Labour come top of a MORI poll with 41% of the vote (compared to the 38% attained by the Conservatives). Just over six months ago, the Conservatives had a 16-point lead over Labour in the opinion polls. However, Kinnock is still faced with the task of overhauling a triple-digit Conservative majority.
- 12 March – Miners' strike begins and pits the National Union of Mineworkers against Margaret Thatcher's Conservative government intent on free market reform of the nationalised industries, which includes plans for the closure of most of Britain's remaining coal pits.
- 14 March – Sinn Féin's Gerry Adams and three others are seriously injured in a gun attack by the Ulster Volunteer Force (UVF).
- 21 March – European Economic Community summit breaks down over disagreement over Britain's budget rebate with Margaret Thatcher threatening to veto any expansion of spending plans.
- 23 March – Hilda Murrell, 78-year-old rose grower and anti-nuclear campaigner, is found dead near her home in Shropshire, five days after being reported missing. West Mercia Police launch a murder investigation.
- 27 March – Starlight Express opens at Apollo Victoria Theatre in London.
- 28 March – A greenfield site at Washington, near Sunderland, is confirmed as the location for the new Nissan car factory.
- 31 March – Chatham Dockyard in Medway is closed after being used a shipbuilding yard for over 400 years since the reign of Henry VIII.

=== April ===
- 2 April – Youth gangs run riot in Wolverhampton, looting from shops.
- 4 April – Peace protesters evicted from the Greenham Common Women's Peace Camp.
- 9 April – More than 100 pickets are arrested in violent clashes at the colliery at Creswell, Derbyshire, and the Babbington Colliery in Nottinghamshire. It is estimated that 46 out of 176 British coal mines are currently active as miners fight government plans to close 20 coal mines across Britain.
- 12 April
  - Arthur Scargill, the leader of the National Union of Mineworkers, rules out a national ballot of miners on whether to continue their strike, which has already lasted five weeks.
  - Telecommunications Act 1984 provides for the privatisation of British Telecom.
- 15 April – Comedian Tommy Cooper, 63, collapses and dies on stage from a heart attack during a live televised show, Live from Her Majesty's.
- 17 April – WPC Yvonne Fletcher is shot and killed by a secluded gunman during a siege outside the Libyan Embassy in London in the event known as the 1984 Libyan Embassy Siege. 11 other people are also shot but survive.
- 22 April – In the wake of WPC Yvonne Fletcher's death, Britain severs diplomatic relations with Libya and serves warning on its seven remaining Libyan diplomats to return to their homeland.
- 25 April – Austin Rover launches its new Montego four-door saloon which replaces the Austin Ambassador and Morris Ital and is derived from the Maestro hatchback. A five-door estate version of the Montego is due later this year.
- 27 April – 30 Libyan diplomats leave Britain.

=== May ===
- 2 May – The Liverpool International Garden Festival opens in Liverpool.
- 3 May – By-elections are held in Cynon Valley in Wales, and Stafford and South West Surrey in England, caused by the deaths of their MPs (respectively Ioan Evans of Labour, and Conservatives Hugh Fraser and Harold Macmillan's son Maurice). All three seats are held by the incumbent parties. The new MPs are Ann Clwyd, Bill Cash and Virginia Bottomley.
- 8 May – The Thames Barrier, designed to protect London from floods, is opened by The Queen.
- 12 May – Liverpool F.C. secure a third consecutive league title and the 15th in the club's history, despite being held to a 0–0 draw away at Notts County.
- 19 May
  - Everton win the FA Cup, their first major trophy for 14 years, with a 2–0 win over Watford in the final at Wembley Stadium. The goals are scored by Andy Gray and Graeme Sharp. Everton's last FA Cup triumph came in 1966, and they have now won the trophy four times.
  - The Poet Laureate Sir John Betjeman dies aged 77 at his home in Trebetherick, Cornwall.
- 23 May – 16 people are killed in the Abbeystead disaster, caused by exploding methane gas.
- 26 May – The football British Home Championship, which has been contested by the four home nations since 1884, witnesses its last game. Northern Ireland win the trophy.
- 28 May – Comedian Eric Morecambe dies of a heart attack aged 58 after collapsing on stage at the Roses Theatre in Tewkesbury the previous day.
- 29 May – Fighting at Orgreave colliery between police and striking miners leaves 64 injured.
- 30 May
  - The Queen officially opens a new terminal at Birmingham Airport. The terminal has been in use since the start of last month, replacing the original terminal that opened in 1939.
  - Liverpool win the European Cup for the fourth time with a penalty shoot-out victory over AS Roma of Italy after a 1–1 draw in the final at Olympic Stadium in Rome. Liverpool, who have also won the Football League First Division and Football League Cup this season, are the first English club to win three major trophies in the same season.
  - Arthur Scargill is arrested and charged with obstruction at Orgreave.

=== June ===
- 1 June – Murder of Mark Tildesley: A 7-year-old boy from Wokingham in Berkshire disappears after visiting a local fairground and being abducted and killed by a paedophile group led by Sidney Cooke; only one named member of the gang is convicted of the crime (in 1992) and the victim's body will not be found (as of 2019).
- 7 June – 120 people are arrested when fighting breaks out outside the Houses of Parliament during a mass lobby by striking miners.
- 14 June
  - The European Parliament Election is held. The Tories lead the way with 45 MEPs, with Labour in second place with 32. The SDP–Liberal Alliance gains 18.5% of the vote but fails to elect a single MEP.
  - The Portsmouth South by-election is held, caused by the death of Conservative MP Bonner Pink on 6 May; the SDP under Mike Hancock wins the seat.
- 15 June – A miner picketing a Yorkshire power station is killed by a lorry.
- 18 June – Battle of Orgreave confrontation between picketing miners and police.
- 19 June – Austin Rover launches the Rover 200 saloon, the replacement for the Triumph Acclaim which marks the end of the Triumph brand after 63 years. Like its predecessor, the new car is the result of a venture with Honda.
- 20 June – The biggest school examination shake-up in over 10 years is announced with O-level and CSE examinations to be replaced by a new examination, the GCSE. The first GCSE courses will begin in September 1986 and will be completed in the Summer of 1988.
- 22 June – The inaugural Virgin Atlantic flight takes place.
- 29 June – Control of London Transport is removed from the Greater London Council and transferred to London Regional Transport (reporting to the Secretary of State for Transport) under terms of the London Regional Transport Act 1984.
- 30 June – Elton John plays the famous Night and Day Concert at Wembley Stadium.
- June – British unemployment is at a record high of around 3.26 million – though a higher percentage of the nation's workforce were unemployed during the Great Depression some 50 years ago.

=== July ===
- 4 July – The government announces the abolition of dog licences, which took place in the Local Government Act 1988.
- 6 July
  - David Jenkins consecrated as Bishop of Durham, despite strong objections from conservative Christians.
  - Murder of Isabel Schwarz, a psychiatric social worker, in South London.
- 7 July
  - The 10th G7 summit held in London.
  - Actress Dame Flora Robson dies of cancer aged 82 at her home in Brighton.
- 9 July – A fire in the roof of York Minster, probably caused by an electrical storm, causes extensive damage which is expected to cost millions of pounds to repair.
- 12 July – Robert Maxwell buys the Daily Mirror for £113.4 million.
- 18 July – The general-interest magazine Tit-Bits closes after 104 years.
- 19 July
  - A magnitude 5.4 earthquake with an epicentre in the Llŷn Peninsula of North Wales is felt throughout the United Kingdom.
  - Neil Kinnock's hopes of becoming prime minister are given a boost by the latest MORI poll which puts Labour three points ahead of the Conservatives on 40%,
- 26 July – Trade Union Act prohibits unions from striking without a ballot.
- 28 July–12 August – Great Britain and Northern Ireland compete at the Olympics in Los Angeles, California, and win 5 gold, 11 silver and 21 bronze medals.
- 30 July – A train collides with a cow in the Polmont rail accident near Falkirk in Scotland; thirteen people are killed.

=== August ===
- 2 August – A Surrey businessman wins a case in the European Court of Human Rights over illegal phone tapping by the police.
- 11 August – Barefoot South African runner Zola Budd, controversially granted British citizenship earlier in the year, collides with Mary Decker in the 3000 meters final at the Olympics, neither finishing as medallists.
- 24 August – Vauxhall unveils the Mk2 Astra which will go on sale in October.

=== September ===
- 6 September – A MORI poll shows that the Conservatives now have a slim lead over Labour for the first time this year.
- 7 September – An outbreak of food poisoning in two Yorkshire hospitals has so far claimed 22 lives in the space of two weeks.
- 10 September – Geneticist Alec Jeffreys discovers DNA fingerprinting.
- 11 September – Police arrest Malcolm Fairley at an address in Kentish Town, London, following a nationwide manhunt for the sex attacker known as The Fox.
- 15–16 September – Bones believed to be those of St Edward the Martyr (King of England, 975–978) are enshrined in the Church of St. Edward the Martyr, Brookwood, Surrey.
- 15 September – Diana, The Princess of Wales gives birth to her second son.
- 16 September – The one-day-old son of the Prince and Princess of Wales (Charles and Diana) is named as Henry Charles Albert David.
- 24 September – Four pupils and their teacher die and a further six pupils are injured when a roll of steel from a lorry crushes their minibus near Stuart Bathurst RC High School in Wednesbury, West Midlands.
- 26 September – The United Kingdom and the People's Republic of China sign the initial agreement to return Hong Kong to China in 1997.
- 28 September – The High Court rules that the miner's strike is unlawful.

=== October ===
- 1 October – David Jenkins, Bishop of Durham, launches an attack on Margaret Thatcher's social policies. The Durham area has been particularly hard hit by factory and mine closures since her election as prime minister five years ago.
- 3 October – Plans to expand the Urban Enterprise Zone in Dudley, West Midlands, are approved; developers Don and Roy Richardson get the go-ahead to build a retail park and shopping mall on the main part of the site. The first tenants will move to the site next year and the development is expected in the next 18 months, with scope for further service sector developments in the future.
- 5 October – Police in Essex make the largest cannabis seizure in British criminal history when a multimillion-pound stash of the drug is found on a schooner moored on the River Crouch near North Fambridge village.
- 9 October – Thomas the Tank Engine and Friends is first broadcast on ITV, becoming one of the most successful children's TV programmes of all time since Postman Pat on the BBC three years prior.
- 10 October – The High Court fines the NUM £200,000 and Arthur Scargill £1,000 for contempt of court.
- 11 October – Three people are killed in the Wembley Central rail crash in London.
- 12 October – The Provisional Irish Republican Army attempts to assassinate the Conservative cabinet in the Brighton hotel bombing with an explosive device planted at a conference hotel nearly a month previously. Margaret Thatcher escapes unharmed, but MP Anthony Berry and four other people are killed, whilst Norman Tebbit is trapped among the rubble and his wife Margaret is seriously injured.
- 13 October – Darts player John Lowe achieves the first televised nine dart finish.
- 16 October
  - There is good news for the state-owned car maker Austin Rover. On the day that a facelifted version of its top-selling Austin Metro, now available as a five-door as well as a three-door is launched, it is announced that sales for September have increased by 39% over the same period last year. The pre-facelift Metro was Britain's best selling car last month, while the Maestro (launched 19 months ago) was the second best seller ahead of its key rival the Ford Escort and the six-month-old Austin Montego was the fifth best seller ahead of the Ford Sierra as an estate version of it launches which also marked the end of the Morris marque.
  - Police drama The Bill airs for the first time on ITV. It debuted last year as a pilot show Wooden Top. When the last episode is shown in 2010, it will be the longest-running police procedural in British television history.
- 18 October – Support for the Conservative government is reported to be improving after several months of dismal poll showings, with the latest MORI poll putting them nine points ahead of Labour on 44%.
- 19 October – The developing regional accent continuum 'Estuary English' is first so named.
- 23 October – BBC News presenter Michael Buerk gives a powerful commentary of the famine in Ethiopia which has already claimed thousands of lives and reportedly has the potential to claim the lives of as many as 7 million more people. Numerous British charities including Oxfam and Save the Children begin collection work to aid the famine victims who are mostly encamped near the town of Korem.
- 31 October – Police and Criminal Evidence Act 1984 passed, codifying police powers in investigating suspects.

=== November ===
- 5 November – 800 miners cease striking and return to work.
- 15 November – The General Synod of the Church of England support the ordination of women as deacons, but not as full priests.
- 19 November – The number of working miners increases to around 62,000 when nearly 3,000 striking miners return to work.
- 20 November – British Telecom shares go on sale in the biggest share issue ever. Two million people (5% of the adult population) buy shares, almost doubling the number of share owners in Britain.
- 22 November – Council of Civil Service Unions v Minister for the Civil Service, a leading case in UK constitutional law, is decided in the House of Lords, ruling that royal prerogative is subject to judicial review, although the government's action in preventing staff of GCHQ from joining a trade union can be justified on national security grounds.
- 23 November – The Oxford Circus fire traps around 1,000 passengers on the London Underground but nobody is killed.
- 25 November – 36 of Britain and Ireland's top pop musicians gather in a Notting Hill studio to form Band Aid and record the song "Do They Know It's Christmas?" in order to raise money for famine relief in Ethiopia.
- 28 November – The British Telecom share offer closes.
- 30 November
  - Tension in the miners' strike increases when two South Wales miners are charged with the murder of taxi driver David Wilkie, 35, who died when a concrete block was dropped on his car from a road bridge. The passenger in his car, who escaped with minor injuries, was a miner who had defied the strike and continued going to work.
  - The UK and French governments announce their intention to seek private promoters for the construction of the Channel Tunnel in order to build and operate it without public funding. The tunnel, for which proposals were first made as far back as 1802, is expected to be open in the early-1990s. The tunnel would be formally opened in a ceremony in 1994 by Queen Elizabeth II and the president of France.

=== December ===
- 3 December
  - British Telecom is privatised.
  - The Band Aid charity single is released.
- 4 December – Eccles rail crash; three people are killed.
- 10 December
  - Richard Stone wins the Nobel Prize in Economics "for having made fundamental contributions to the development of systems of national accounts and hence greatly improved the basis for empirical economic analysis".
  - César Milstein wins the Nobel Prize in Physiology or Medicine jointly with Niels Kaj Jerne and Georges J. F. Köhler "for theories concerning the specificity in development and control of the immune system and the discovery of the principle for production of monoclonal antibodies".
- 11 December – Band Aid's "Do They Know It's Christmas?" goes to the top of the UK Singles Chart.
- 12 December – Bucks Fizz, the highly successful pop group, are involved in a road accident near Newcastle upon Tyne when their tour bus crashes in icy road conditions after a concert. Bobby Gee, Cheryl Baker and Jay Aston escape with relatively minor injuries, but Mike Nolan is in a serious condition.
- 14 December
  - Michael Portillo begins his political career after being elected Conservative MP for Enfield South, in the by-election sparked by Sir Anthony Berry's death in the Brighton hotel bombing.
  - Arthur Scargill, president of the NUM, is fined £250 and ordered to pay £750 for his involvement in the rioting at Orgreave coking plant on 29 May this year. He decides against appealing his convictions, despite his lawyers advising him to do so.
- 16 December – Mikhail Gorbachev of the Soviet Union visits Britain.
- 18 December – The government announces the privatisation of the Trustee Savings Bank.
- 19 December
  - The People's Republic of China and the United Kingdom sign the Sino-British Joint Declaration which will see the whole of the British Overseas Territory of Hong Kong returning to Chinese control in 13 years.
  - Ted Hughes' appointment as Poet Laureate in succession to Sir John Betjeman is announced, Philip Larkin having turned down the post.
- 21 December – The three-month-old son of The Prince and Princess of Wales is christened Henry Charles Albert David. (He is and always has been called "Harry").
- 22 December – Band Aid's charity single is this year's Christmas number one.
- 31 December – Rick Allen, drummer of Def Leppard, loses his left arm in a car accident on the A57 road at Snake Pass.

=== Undated ===
- Non-diocesan Bishop at Lambeth first appointed within the Church of England.
- Vauxhall have a successful year in the motor industry. It has reported that its market share has doubled since 1981 and the year ends on an even bigger high when its MK2 Astra range is elected European Car of the Year, alongside its European counterpart the Opel Kadett.
- Despite unemployment reaching a peak of nearly 3.3million this year (with the highest unemployment rate recorded since 1971 of 11.9% in February), inflation is still low at 5%.
- Youth unemployment (covering the 16–24 age range) stands at a record 1,200,000 – more than a third of the total unemployment count.

== Publications ==
- Douglas Adams' novel So Long, and Thanks for All the Fish.
- J. G. Ballard's novel Empire of the Sun.
- Iain Banks's novel The Wasp Factory.
- Julian Barnes's novel Flaubert's Parrot.
- Anita Brookner's novel Hotel du Lac.
- Angela Carter's novel Nights at the Circus.
- Alasdair Gray's novel 1982, Janine
- Antony Jay and Jonathan Lynn's fictitious The Complete Yes Minister: The Diaries of a Cabinet Minister
- David Lodge’s novel Small World: An Academic Romance.
- Mary Wesley's novel The Camomile Lawn.

== Births ==
- 7 January – George Gilbey, English television personality (d. 2024)
- 15 January – Natasia Demetriou, English actress
- 17 January – Calvin Harris, Scottish electropop singer-songwriter, musician, DJ and record producer
- 28 January
  - Ben Clucas, English racing driver
  - Anne Panter, field hockey player
- 12 February – Jennie McAlpine, actress
- 14 February – Stephanie Leonidas, actress
- 21 February – Hannah Fry, mathematician and broadcaster
- 27 February – Catriona Forrest, Scottish field hockey player
- 28 March – Nikki Sanderson, actress
- 8 April – Michelle Donelan, politician
- 21 April – Bhavna Limbachia, actress
- 22 April
  - Michelle Ryan, actress
  - Phillip Magee, Northern Irish singer and The X Factor (British series 2) finalist
- 4 May – Little Boots (Victoria Hesketh), electropop singer-songwriter, musician, DJ and record producer
- 15 May – Alex Brooker, journalist and television presenter
- 22 May – Clara Amfo, radio and television presenter
- 10 June – Ryan Thomas, actor
- 25 June – Amrita Hunjan, singer
- 7 July – Adam Paul Harvey, actor
- 8 July – TotalBiscuit, internet personality (d. 2018)
- 12 July
  - Gareth Gates, singer
  - Florence Hoath, actress
- 18 July – Lee Barnard, footballer
- 8 August – Owen Jones, journalist and political commentator
- 19 August – Simon Bird, actor and comedian
- 5 September – Annabelle Wallis, actress
- 15 September – Prince Harry, Duke of Sussex
- 26 September – Keisha Buchanan, singer
- 28 September
  - Simon Clarke, politician
  - Helen Oyeyemi, novelist
- 14 October – Alex Scott, English footballer and sports commentator
- 16 October – Shayne Ward, singer
- 18 October – Milo Yiannopoulos, alt-right commentator
- 25 October – Adam MacKenzie, Scottish field hockey defender
- 27 October – Kelly Osbourne, singer
- 5 November – Nick Tandy, racing driver
- 8 November – Steven Webb, actor
- 26 November – Jayde Adams, comedian
- 30 November – Alan Hutton, Scottish footballer
- 7 December – Laura Trott, politician
- 10 December – Mark Applegarth, English rugby player
- 14 December – Chris Brunt, footballer
- 21 December – Darren Potter, footballer
- 25 December – Nadiya Hussain, television chef and broadcaster
- 28 December
  - Leroy Lita, footballer
  - Alex Lloyd, racing driver

== Deaths ==
=== January ===
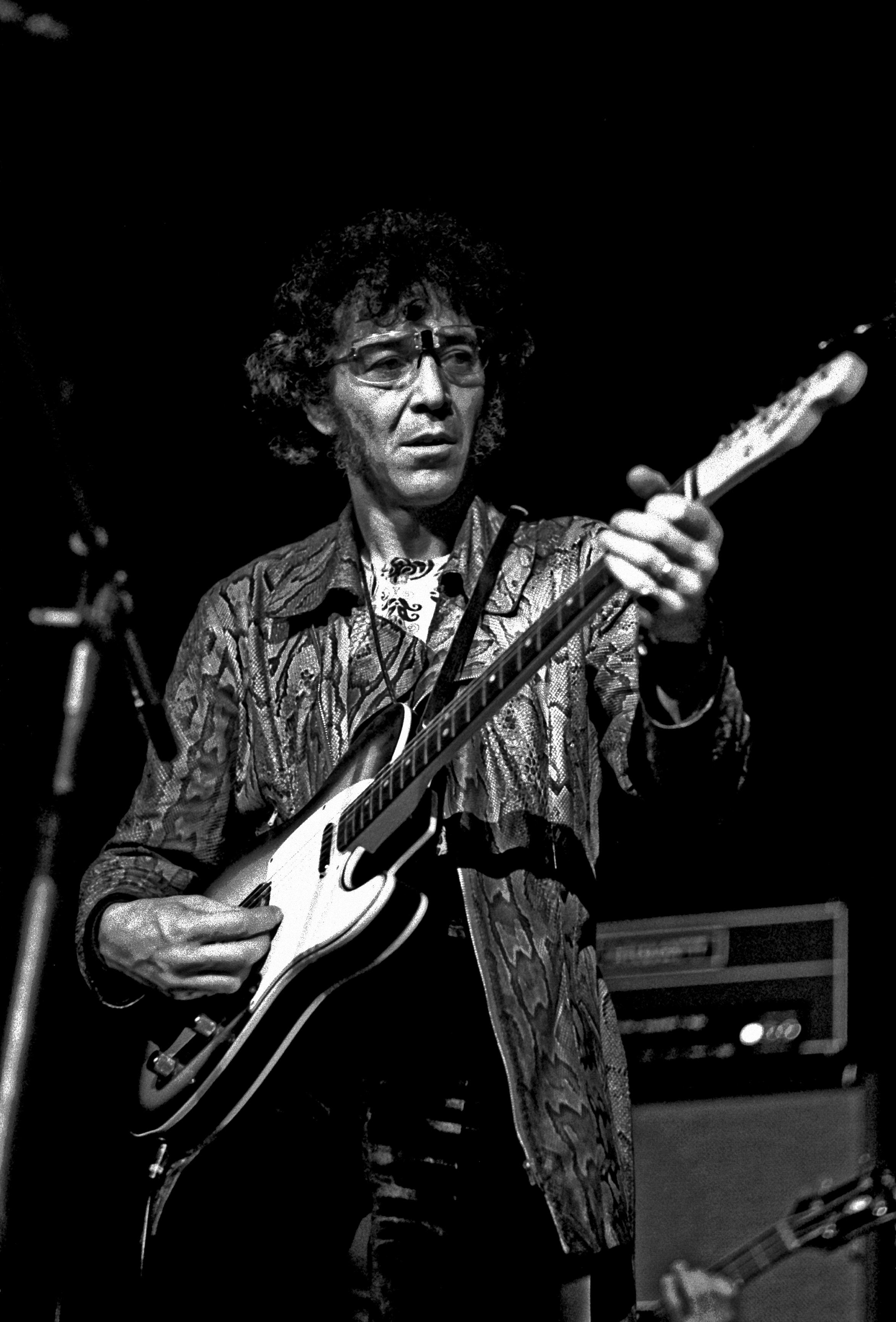
Alexis Korner

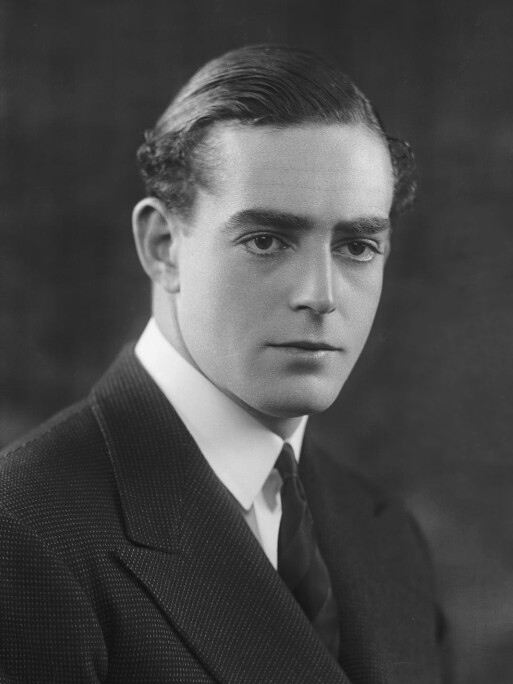
Charles Greville, 7th Earl of Warwick

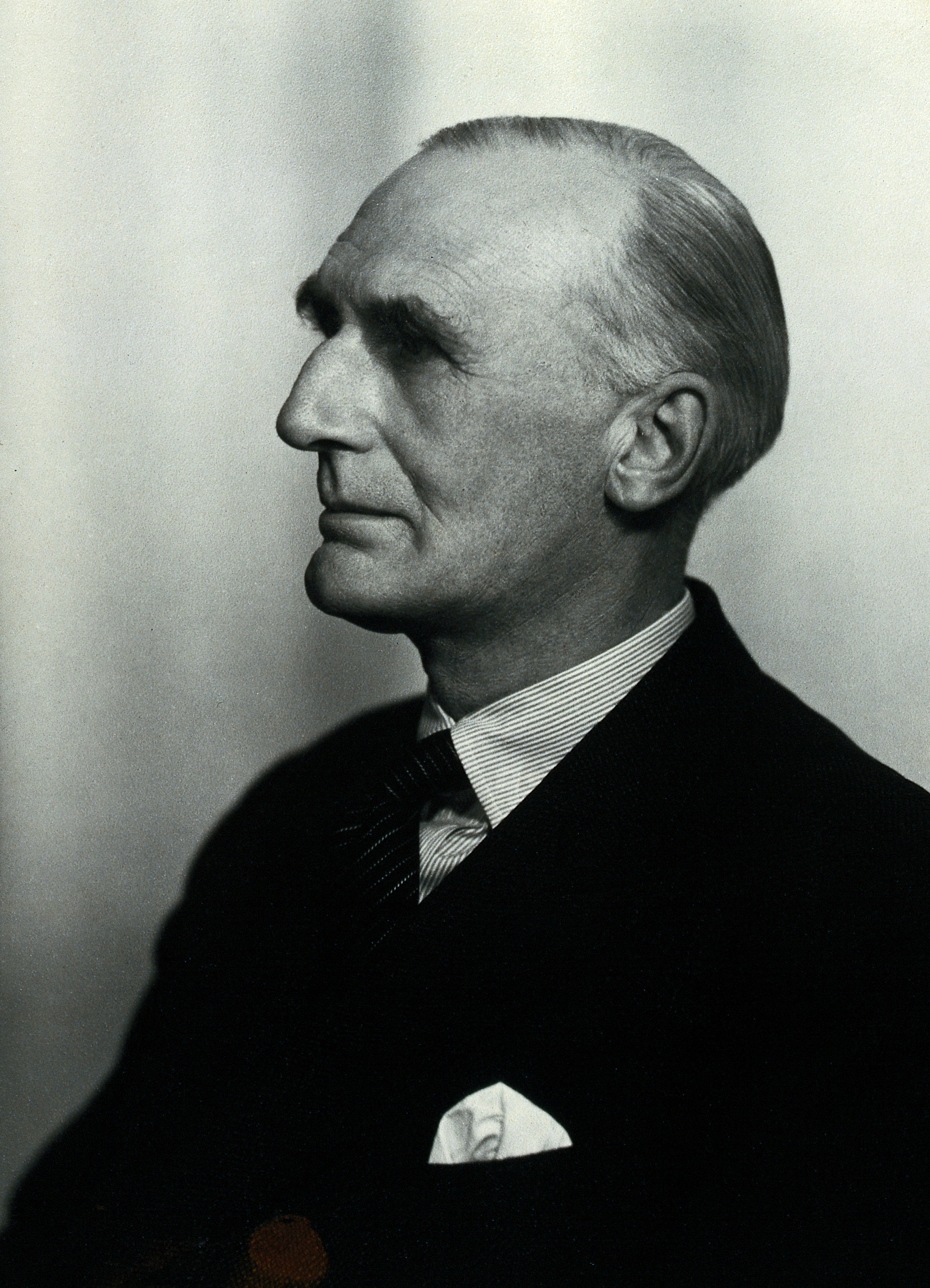
John William McNee

- 1 January
  - Patrick Douglas Baird, glaciologist (born 1912)
  - A. E. Clouston, test pilot and Royal Air Force Air Commodore (born 1909)
  - Billy Hill (gangster), gangster (born 1911)
  - Alexis Korner, musician (born 1928)
  - Allen Wheeler, pilot and Royal Air Force Air Commodore (born 1903)
- 3 January
  - Fergus McDonell, film director (born 1910)
  - Sir Morris Sugden, physical chemist (born 1919)
- 4 January
  - Sir Wilfred Burns, town planner (born 1923)
  - Jameson Clark, actor (born 1907)
  - Sir Kenneth Thompson, politician and former Member of parliament for Liverpool Walton (born 1909)
- 5 January – Thomas Bloomer, Bishop of Carlisle (born 1894)
- 6 January – Ronald Lewin, military historian (born 1914)
- 7 January
  - Beresford Egan, satirical draughtsman, painter, novelist and playwright (born 1905)
  - Walter Forde, actor (born 1898)
- 8 January
  - John Breck, actor (born 1953)
  - Harry Selby, politician, Member of Parliament for Glasgow Govan
- 9 January
  - John Brough, oriental scholar (born 1917)
  - Sir Frederick Gibberd, architect (born 1908)
  - Thomas Murchison, Scottish Presbyterian minister and scholar (born 1907)
- 10 January
  - Lancelot Stephen Bosanquet, mathematician (born 1903)
  - Alasdair Clayre, author, broadcaster, singer-songwriter and academic (born 1935)
  - Binnie Hale, actress (born 1899)
  - Sir Ernest Albert Vasey, colonial politician and former actor (born 1901)
  - Christopher Woolner, senior army officer (born 1893)
- 13 January
  - Ian Campbell, artist (born 1902)
  - Michael Shanks, journalist (born 1927)
  - Tommy Younger, Scottish footballer (born 1930)
- 16 January
  - Joan Liversidge, archaeologist (born 1914)
  - Enid Porter, museum curator (born 1908)
- 17 January – Geoffrey Bell, English cricketer (born 1896)
- 20 January – Charles Greville, 7th Earl of Warwick, peer (born 1911)
- 21 January – Hywel Murrell, psychologist (born 1908)
- 22 January – Noël Bowater, Lord Mayor of London (born 1892)
- 26 January
  - Grahame Clifford, actor and opera singer (born 1905)
  - Sir John William McNee, bacteriologist (born 1887)
- 28 January – Bill Radcliffe, Manx language activist (born 1917)
- 31 January – John Eric Miers Macgregor, conservation architect (born 1890)

=== February ===
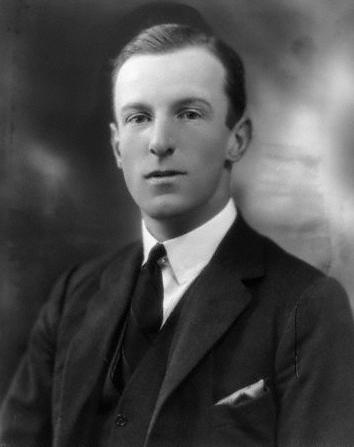
Henry Somerset, 10th Duke of Beaufort

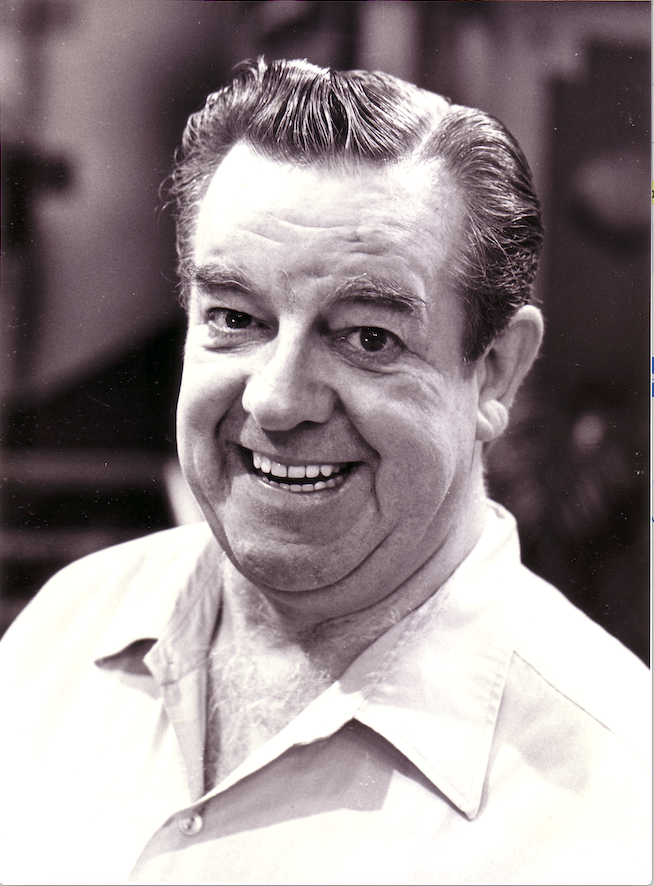
John Comer

- 4 February
  - Alan Buchanan, bishop (born 1905)
  - Dorothy Davison, writer and artist (born 1889)
  - Frederick Lee, Baron Lee of Newton, politician (born 1906)
- 5 February – Henry Somerset, 10th Duke of Beaufort, peer (born 1900)
- 7 February – Gerald Palmer, author and politician (born 1904)
- 8 February – Mabel Crout, politician (born 1890)
- 9 February
  - Derrick Sherwin Bailey, theologian (born 1910)
  - Mary Skeaping, ballet teacher (born 1902)
- 10 February
  - Ioan Evans, politician (born 1927)
  - Fred Hill, activist against the wearing of crash helmets by motorcyclists (born 1909; died in prison)
  - Redvers Opie, economist (born 1900)
- 11 February
  - John Comer, actor (born 1924)
  - Theodore William Moody, historian (born 1907, Ireland)
- 12 February – Tom Keating, art restorer (born 1917)
- 16 February – Lucius Thompson-McCausland, economist (born 1904)
- 18 February – Paul Gardiner, musician (overdose) (born 1958)
- 22 February – Max Newman, mathematician and World War II codebreaker (born 1897)
- 26 February – Dame Elizabeth Hoyer-Millar, naval officer (born 1910)
- 28 February – Joseph Leftwich, Dutch-born critic and translator (born 1892)
- 29 February – Alexander Murray Drennan, pathologist (born 1884)

=== March ===
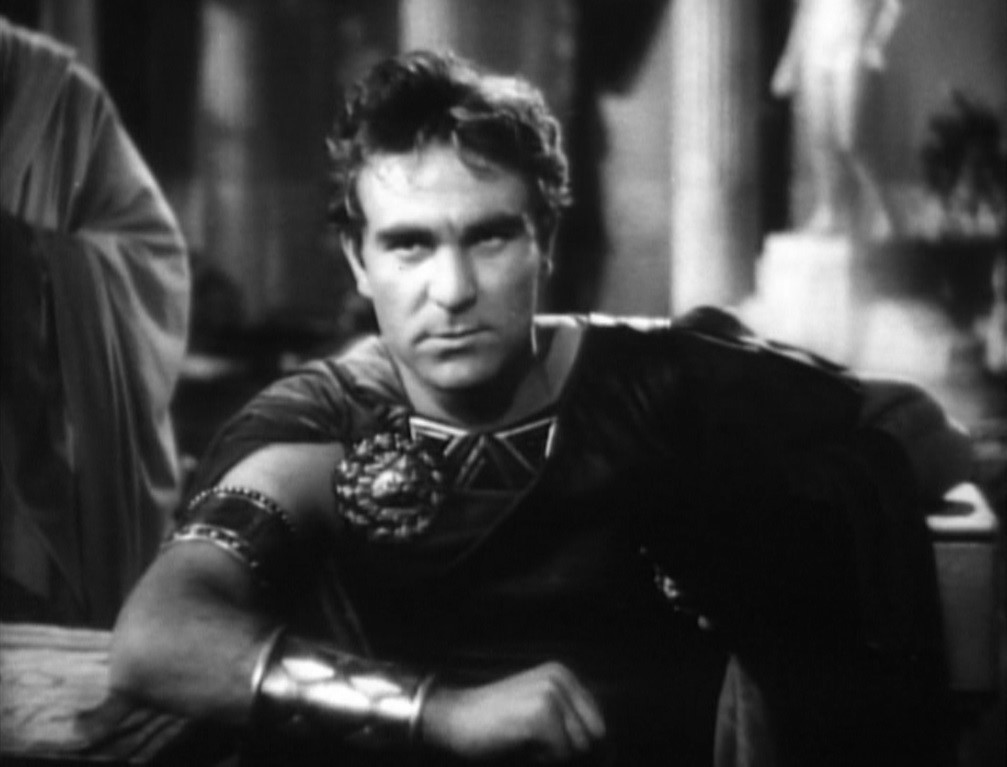
Henry Wilcoxon

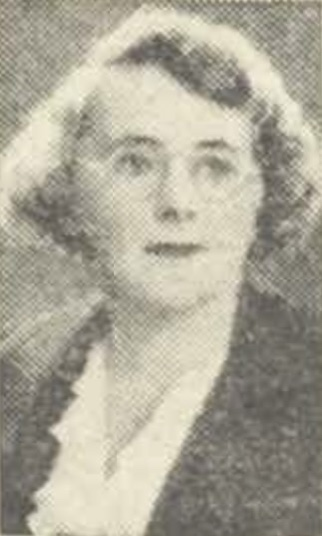
Peg Maltby

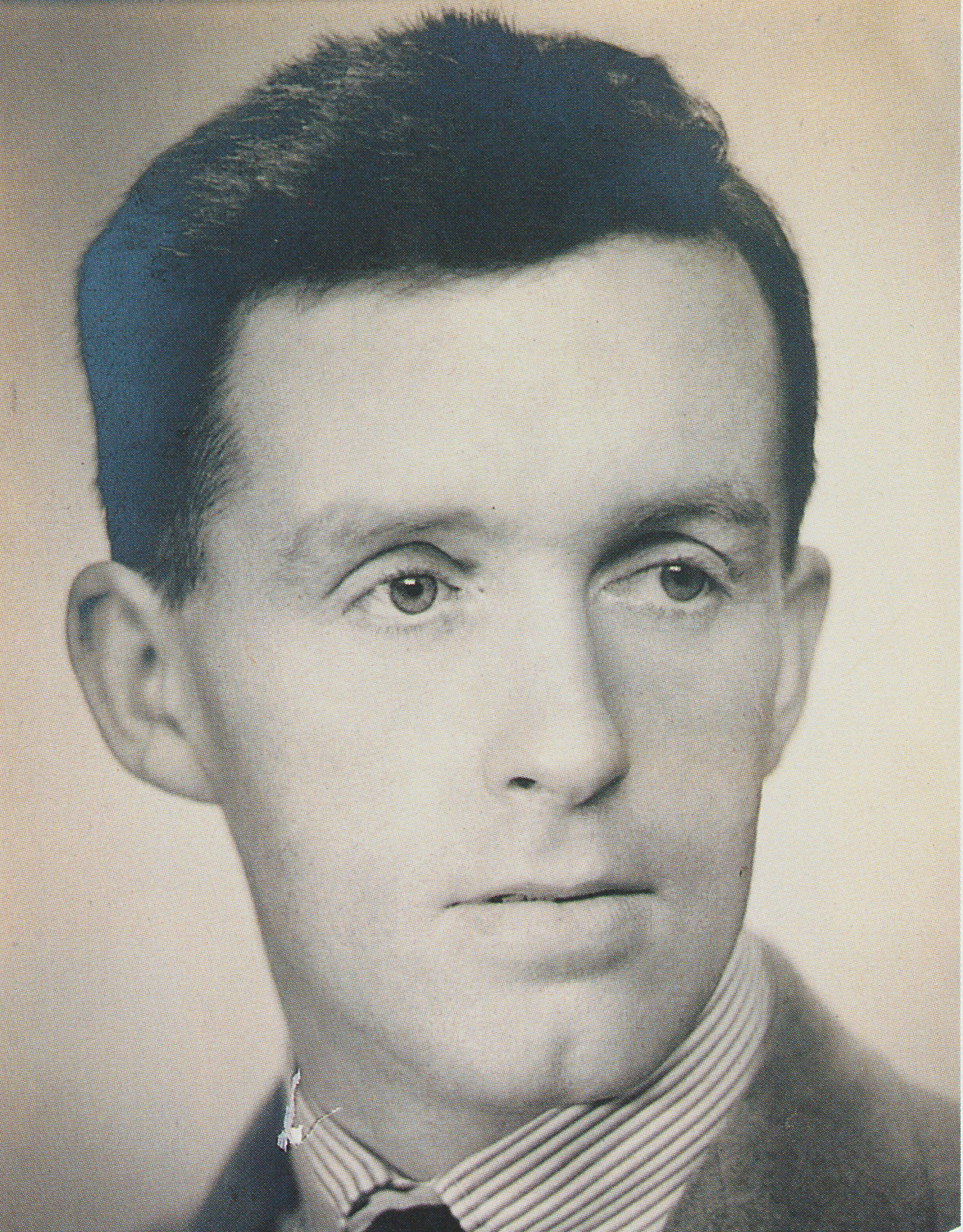
Arnold Ridley

- 1 March
  - Roland Culver, actor (born 1900)
  - Jeffrey Rowbotham, architect (born 1920)
  - Peter Walker, racing driver (born 1912)
- 3 March
  - John Adams, physicist (born 1920)
  - Brian Downs, literary scholar and linguist (born 1893)
  - Harry Hudson Rodmell, artist (born 1896)
  - Rinty Monaghan, Northern Irish boxer (born 1918)
  - Kathleen Richards, pianist and composer (born 1895)
- 4 March
  - Basil Lam, harpsichordist, musical scholar and radio presenter (born 1914)
  - Geoffrey Lumsden, actor (born 1914)
- 6 March
  - Sir Leslie Farrer, lawyer (born 1900)
  - Hugh Fraser, politician (born 1918)
  - Henry Wilcoxon, actor (born 1905)
- 10 March – Maurice Macmillan, Conservative Party MP and son of former prime minister Harold Macmillan (born 1921)
- 11 March
  - Douglas Bliss, painter and art conservationist (born 1900, British India)
  - Charles Hodson, Baron Hodson, judge (born 1895)
- 12 March
  - L. M. Harrod, librarian (born 1905)
  - Peg Maltby, British-born Australian writer and illustrator (born 1899)
  - Arnold Ridley, playwright and actor (born 1896)
  - Leslie R. H. Willis, archaeologist (born 1908)
- 16 March
  - Reginald Bonham, blind chess player (born 1906)
  - Lucius Cary, 14th Viscount Falkland, Scottish peer (born 1905)
- 17 March
  - Alastair Cram, Army major (born 1909)
  - John Dearth, actor (born 1920)
- 24 March – Harold Shearman, politician (born 1896)
- c. 24 March – Hilda Murrell, horticulturalist and anti-nuclear activist (murdered) (born 1906)
- 26 March – Sylva Stuart Watson, theatre director (born 1894)
- 27 March
  - Winifred Crossley Fair, aviator (born 1906)
  - Derek Francis, actor (born 1923)
  - Reg Pratt, businessman and owner of West Ham United (1950–1979) (born 1905)
- 28 March – Ian Stephens, journalist (born 1903)
- 29 March – Henry Brooke, Baron Brooke of Cumnor, politician, Home Secretary (1962–1964)
- 31 March – Jack Howarth, actor (born 1896)

=== April ===
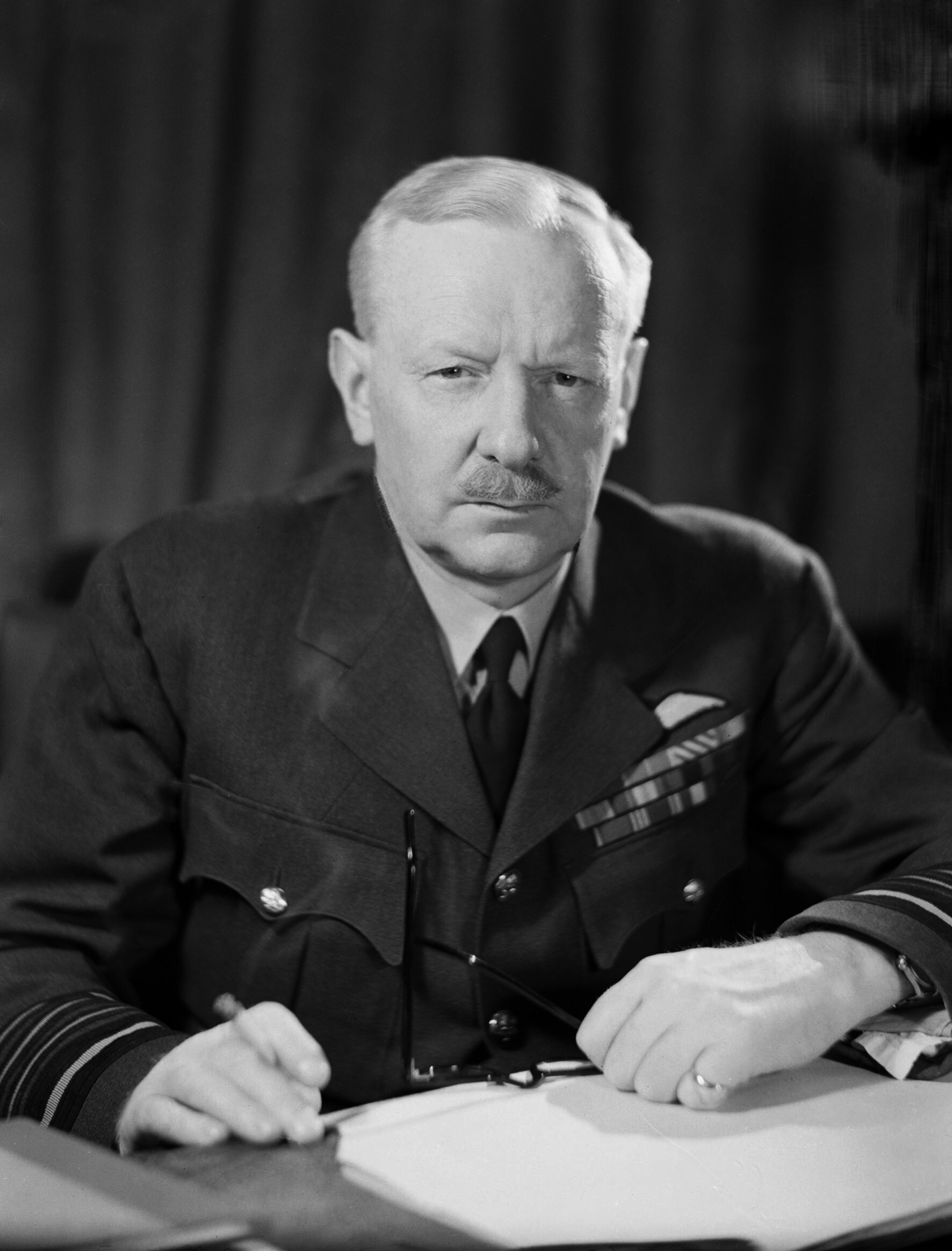
Arthur Travers Harris

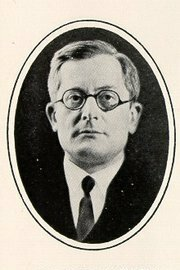
William Empson

- 1 April
  - Douglas Cooper, art historian and collector (born 1911)
  - Vera Dart, politician (born 1892)
  - Elizabeth Goudge, children's author (born 1900)
  - William Kendall, actor (born 1903)
- 3 April – Arthur Pickles, architect and politician (born 1901)
- 4 April
  - William Henderson, 1st Baron Henderson, politician (born 1891)
  - Sir Otway Herbert, Army general (born 1901)
  - Beryl Smalley, historian (born 1905)
- 5 April
  - Robert Adams, sculptor (born 1917)
  - Sir Basil Eugster, Army general (born 1914)
  - Sir Arthur Travers Harris, Air Officer Commanding-in-Chief of RAF Bomber Command during the Second World War (born 1892)
  - Sidney Webster, RAF vice-marshal (born 1900)
- 6 April – Nan Green, Spanish Civil War nurse and statistician (born 1904)
- 9 April – Sir Basil Blackwell, publisher (born 1889)
- 10 April – Elva Blacker, artist (born 1908)
- 11 April – John Lloyd Thomas, Anglican priest (born 1908)
- 14 April – Thorold Dickinson, film director and producer (born 1903)
- 15 April
  - Tommy Cooper, comedian and magician (born 1921)
  - William Empson, poet and literary critic (born 1906)
  - Walter Padley, politician (born 1916)
  - Robert Russell Race, physician and geneticist (born 1907)
  - Alexander Trocchi, writer (born 1925)
- 17 April – Clare Winnicott, social worker and teacher (born 1906)
- 20 April
  - Mabel Mercer, British-born American singer (born 1900)
  - A. R. Rawlinson, Army lieutenant-colonel (born 1894)
- 21 April – Marjorie Brierley, psychoanalyst (born 1893)
- 23 April
  - Harry Hibbs, English footballer (born 1906)
  - Sir Roland Penrose, Surrealist painter and art collector (born 1900)
- 26 April
  - Barry Gray, composer and musician (born 1908)
  - Sybil Morrison, suffragist and pacifist (born 1893)
- 28 April – Phyllis Digby Morton, fashion journalist (born 1901)
- 30 April – Marcus Dods, composer and musician (born 1918)

=== May ===
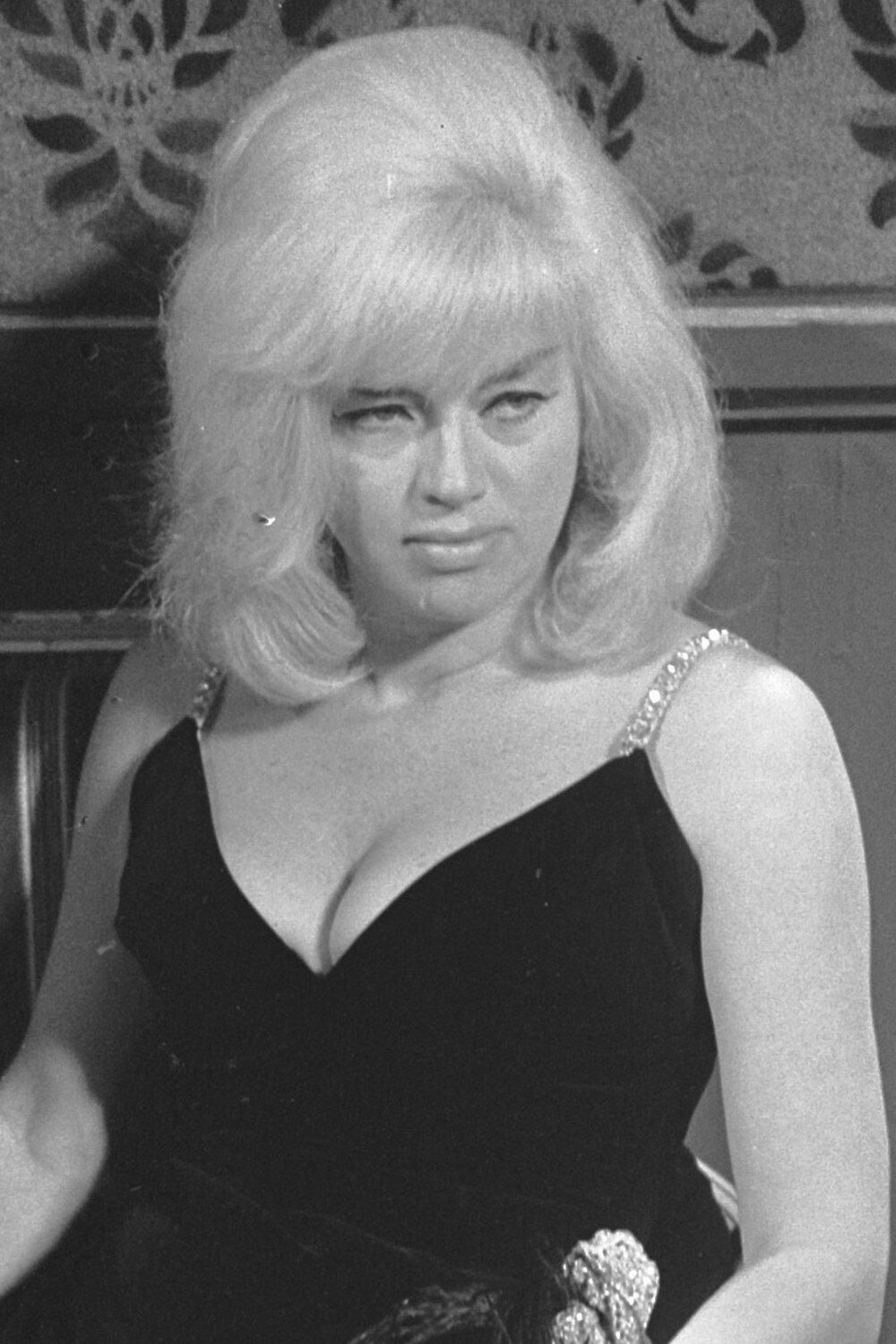
Diana Dors

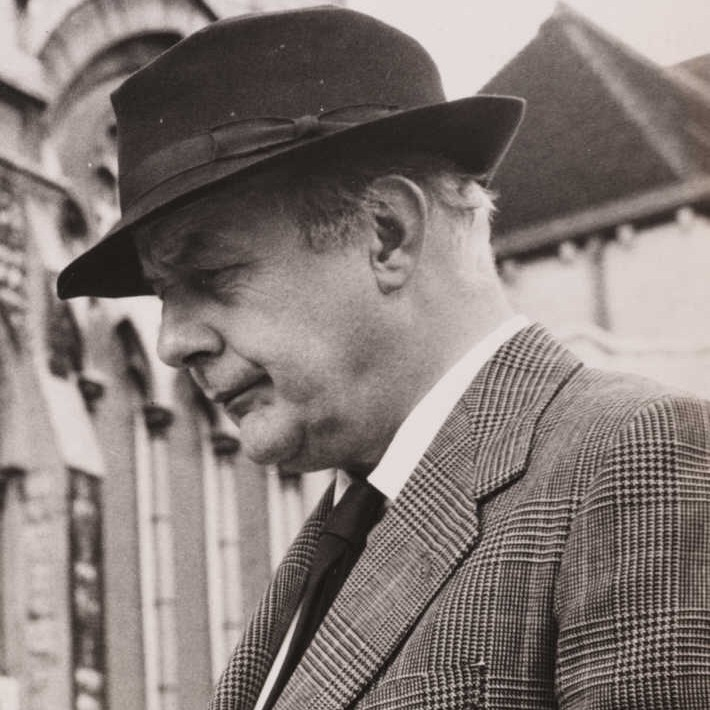
John Betjeman

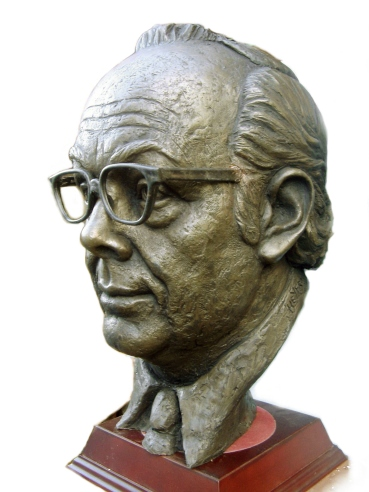
Eric Morecambe

- 1 May – Muriel Herbert, composer (born 1897)
- 2 May
  - Frank Forsyth, actor (born 1905)
  - Meredith Thomas, RAF vice-marshal (born 1892)
- 4 May – Diana Dors, actress (born 1931)
- 6 May
  - Bonner Pink, politician (born 1912)
  - Ernest Shufflebotham, potter and pottery designer (born 1908)
- 7 May – James Purdon Martin, neurologist (born 1893)
- 8 May – David Williams, geologist (born 1898)
- 15 May
  - Mary Adams, television producer and social researcher (born 1898)
  - Sir Geoffrey Arthur, academic administrator and diplomat (born 1920)
  - Sir Alec Bishop, Army major-general (born 1897)
  - Michael Noble, Baron Glenkinglas, politician (born 1913)
  - Lionel Robbins, economist (born 1898)
- 16 May
  - Ruth Ainsworth, author of children's books (born 1908)
  - Jean Donald, Scottish golfer (born 1921)
- 19 May
  - Sir John Betjeman, writer and poet laureate (born 1906)
  - Dorothy Hutton, painter and printmaker (born 1889)
- 20 May – Richard Coleridge, 4th Baron Coleridge, peer and Royal Navy officer (born 1905)
- 24 May – Sir Stanley Hooker, mathematician and aircraft engineer (born 1907)
- 25 May – Sir Charles James Buchanan, Army officer (born 1899)
- 26 May
  - Vera Stanley Alder, artist and mystic (born 1898)
  - Mary Taylor Slow, physicist (born 1898)
- 27 May – Reginald Bosanquet, journalist and broadcaster (born 1932)
- 28 May – Eric Morecambe, comedian (born 1926)
- 29 May – Edward Curzon, 6th Earl Howe, peer (born 1908)
- 30 May
  - Harold Cottam, wireless operator who received the distress call from the RMS Titanic (born 1891)
  - Michael Elliott, theatre and television director (born 1931)

=== June ===
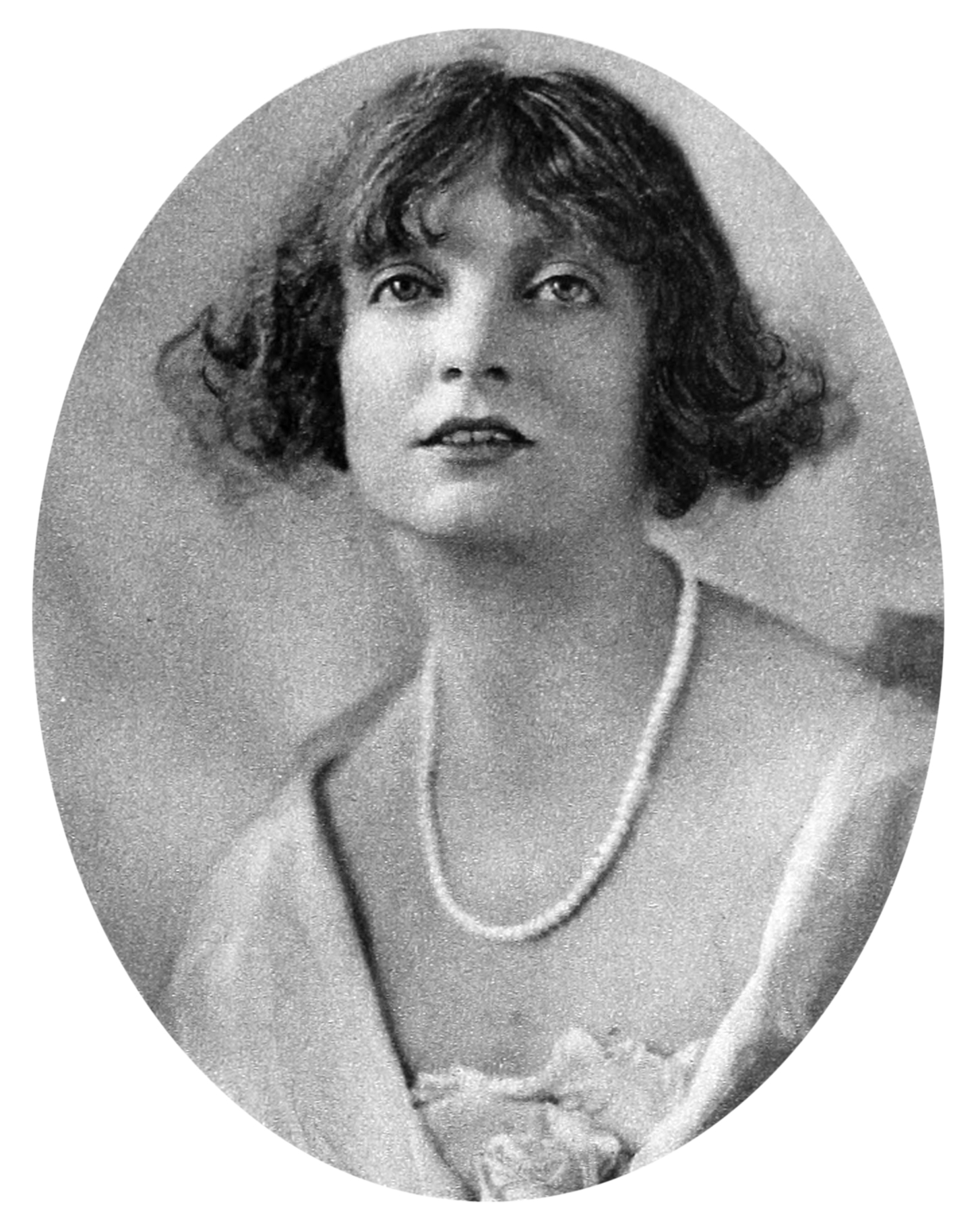
Estelle Winwood

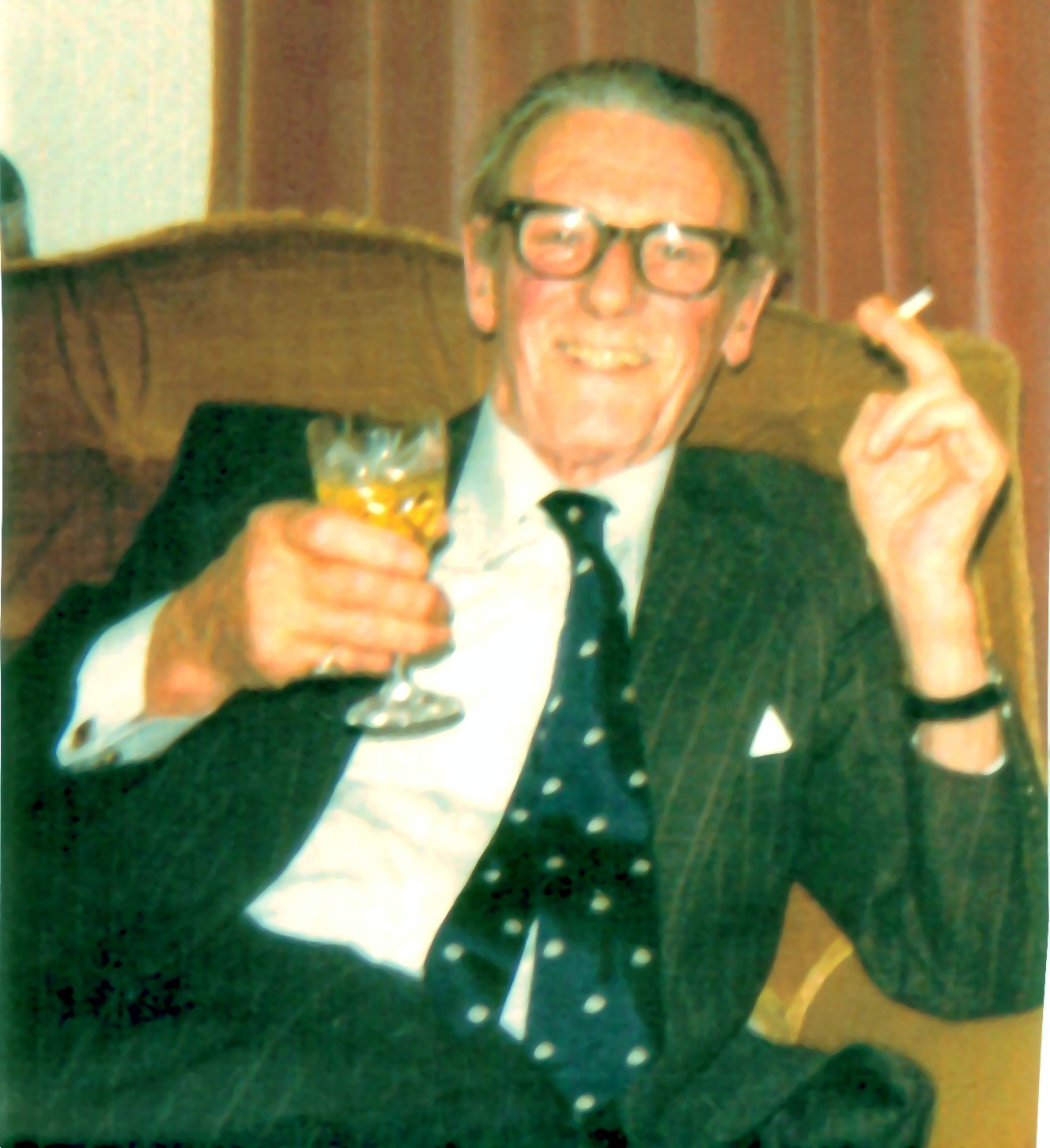
Webster Booth

- 1 June – Francis St David Benwell Lejeune, Army major-general (born 1899)
- 2 June
  - Piers Flint-Shipman, actor (road accident) (born 1962)
  - George Silver, actor (born 1916)
- 3 June
  - Sir John MacLeod, Scottish politician (born 1913)
  - Peter Wilson, auctioneer (born 1913)
- 6 June
  - Edith Sharpe, actress (born 1894)
  - Hugh Sykes Davies, poet and novelist (born 1909)
- 7 June – Ethel Gee, Soviet spy (born 1914)
- 8 June
  - John Baker, biologist (born 1900)
  - David Boyle, 9th Earl of Glasgow, peer and Royal Navy admiral (born 1910)
- 12 June – Sydney Smith, politician (born 1885)
- 13 June
  - Sir George Baker, judge (born 1910)
  - Sir David Evans, microbiologist (born 1909)
- 14 June – Sir Noël Hutton, parliamentary draftsman (born 1907)
- 16 June – Sir John Randall, physicist (born 1905)
- 18 June
  - Sir Idris Foster, Welsh scholar (born 1911)
  - Geoffrey Hirst, politician (born 1904)
- 19 June – Sir Anthony Selway, RAF air marshal (born 1909)
- 20 June – Estelle Winwood, actress (born 1883)
- 21 June – Webster Booth, operatic tenor (born 1902)
- 22 June – Dill Jones, pianist (born 1923)
- 23 June – Cecil Parrott, diplomat and translator (born 1909)
- 24 June – Tommy Godfrey, actor (born 1916)
- 25 June – Reg Dixon, comedian (born 1915)
- 27 June – Arnold Shaw, politician (born 1909)
- 28 June – Gavin Astor, 2nd Baron Astor of Hever, peer, publisher and soldier (born 1918)
- 29 June
  - W. B. Fisher, geographer (born 1916)
  - Paul Gore-Booth, Baron Gore-Booth, diplomat (born 1909)
  - Audrey Richards, sociologist (born 1899)

=== July ===
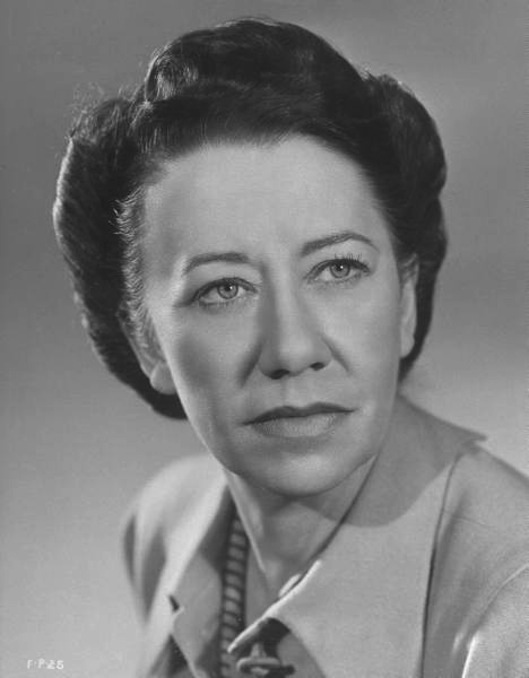
Flora Robson

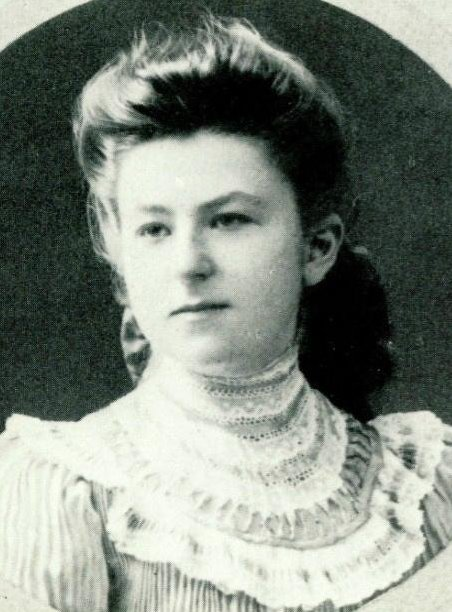
Flora Solomon

- 5 July – Edward Llewellyn-Thomas, scientist and science fiction writer (born 1917)
- 7 July – Dame Flora Robson, actress (born 1902)
- 8 July – Reginald Stewart, orchestral conductor (born 1900)
- 9 July – Margaret Wetherby Williams, crime writer (born 1901)
- 11 July
  - Hugh Morton, actor (born 1903)
  - Johnny Ralph, cyclist (accident) (born 1931)
- 18 July
  - Lally Bowers, actress (born 1914)
  - Flora Solomon, activist (born 1895, Russian Empire)
- 19 July – John Vaizey, Baron Vaizey, author and economist (born 1929)
- 20 July – Gabriel Andrew Dirac, mathematician (born 1925, Hungary)
- 22 July – Peter Brush, Northern Irish lieutenant-colonel and politician (born 1901)
- 23 July – Anthony Sharp, actor (born 1915)
- 27 July – James Mason, actor (born 1909)
- 28 July – Alick Buchanan-Smith, Baron Balerno, soldier and geneticist (born 1898)
- 29 July
  - Elaine M. Catley, British-born Canadian poet (born 1889)
  - Sir Campbell Hardy, Royal Marines officer (born 1906)
- 30 July
  - Winifred Brown, sportswoman, aviator and author (born 1899)
  - Peter Jones, physician to King George VI (born 1917)

=== August ===
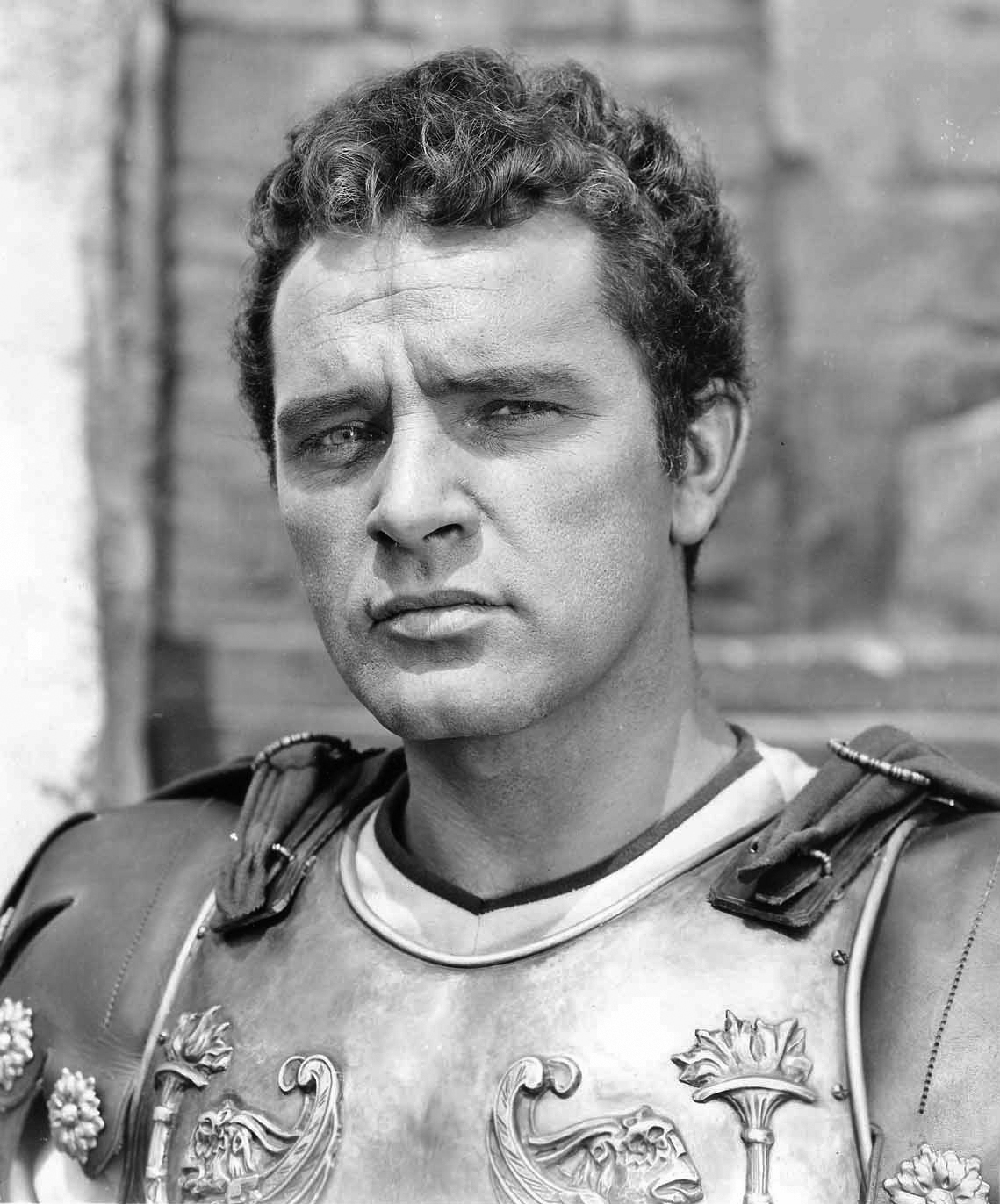
Richard Burton

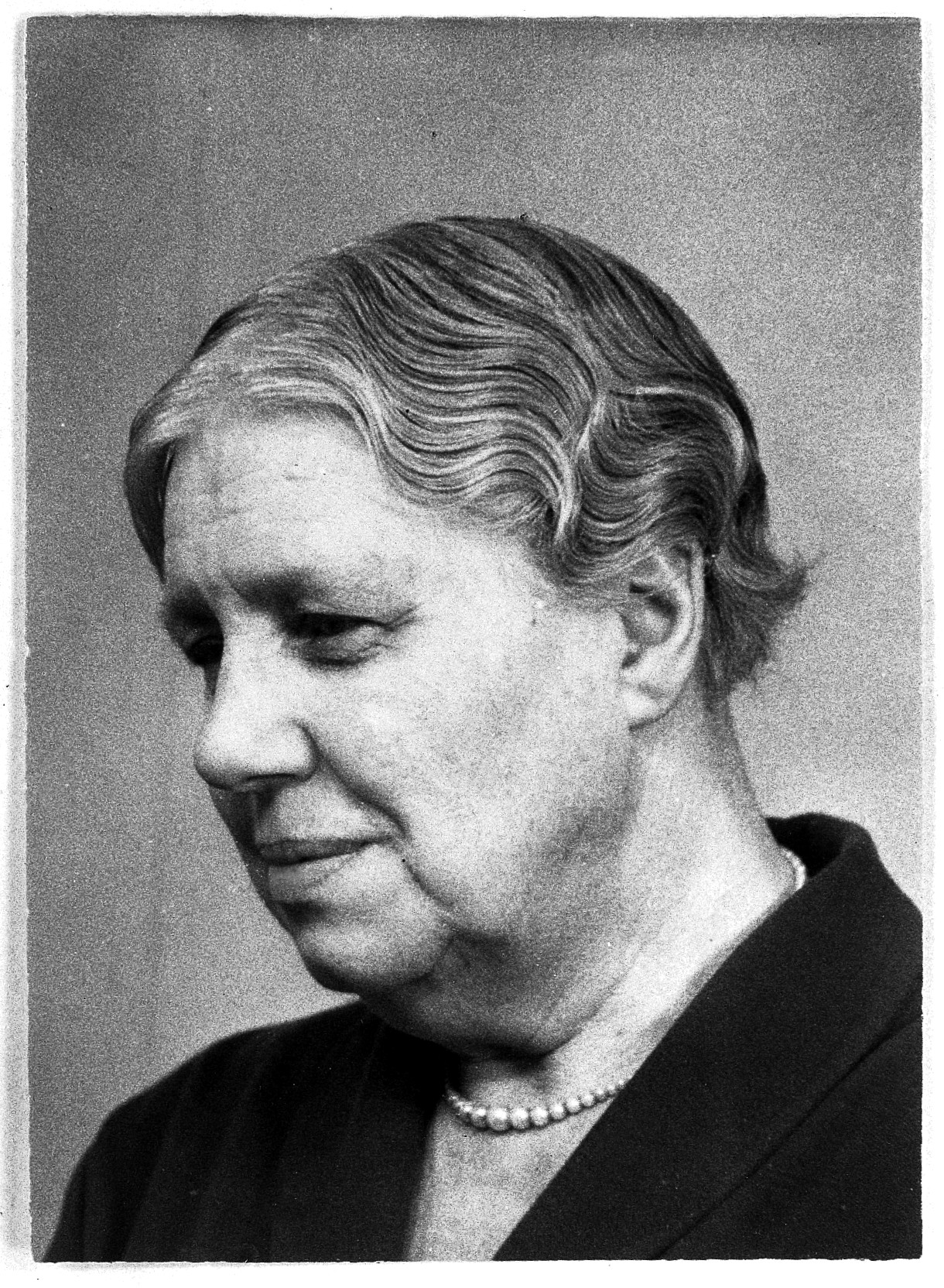
Mary Esslemont

- 2 August – Harold Emmerson, civil servant (born 1896)
- 3 August – Sir Terence McMeekin, Army general (born 1918)
- 5 August
  - Richard Burton, Welsh-born actor (born 1925)
  - Frederick Skinnard, politician (born 1902)
- 9 August – John R. Gray, Scottish Presbyterian minister (born 1913)
- 12 August
  - Christine Hargreaves, actress (born 1939)
  - Raymond Oppenheimer, golfer and dog breeder (born 1905)
- 14 August
  - George Dickinson Hadley, gastroenterologist (born 1908)
  - J. B. Priestley, writer and broadcaster (born 1894)
  - Peter Wishart, composer (born 1921)
- 17 August
  - Mostyn Thomas, operatic tenor (born 1896)
  - Rosa Ward, pioneer of the Girl Guide movement (born 1893)
- 19 August – Edmund Roche, 5th Baron Fermoy, peer and businessman (suicide) (born 1939)
- 20 August – Tom Percival, power boat racer (born 1943; accident in Belgium while racing)
- 21 August
  - William Merrilees, Scottish police officer (born 1898)
  - Bernard Youens, actor (born 1914)
- 23 August
  - Cecil Hoare, protozoologist (born 1892)
  - Helen O'Neil, archaeologist (born 1893)
- 24 August – James Kinsley, literary scholar (born 1922)
- 25 August – Mary Esslemont, physician (born 1891)
- 26 August – Leonard Robert Palmer, philologist (born 1906)
- 27 August
  - Angela Sykes, illustrator (born 1911)
  - Amabel Williams-Ellis, author and critic (born 1894)
- 30 August – Robert Press, civil servant (born 1915)

=== September ===
- 1 September – Alfred Newman, Royal Navy commander (born 1888)
- 2 September – Malcolm Craven, motorcycle racer (born 1915)
- 3 September – Francis Moncreiff, bishop (born 1906)
- 4 September – Elsie Louisa Deacon, railway draughtswoman (born 1897)
- 6 September – Donny MacLeod, television presenter (born 1932)
- 7 September
  - Archibald Gordon, 5th Marquess of Aberdeen and Temair, Scottish peer (born 1913)
  - Jennifer Kendal, actress (born 1934)
- 8 September
  - Anthony Gross, painter and printmaker (born 1905)
  - Frank Lowson, English cricketer (born 1925)
- 9 September
  - Margaret Phillips, actress (born 1923)
  - John Walker, herald (born 1913)
- 12 September – Geoffrey Lloyd, Baron Geoffrey-Lloyd, politician (born 1902)
- 13 September – Denis Shipwright, RAF pilot (born 1898)
- 15 September – Sir Richard Clayton, Royal Navy admiral (born 1925)
- 16 September
  - Peter Blackmore, film screenwriter (born 1909)
  - Meredith Frampton, painter (born 1894)
- 18 September
  - Ralph Assheton, 1st Baron Clitheroe, peer and politician (born 1901)
  - Irene Wellington, calligrapher (born 1904)
- 19 September – Frank Tomney, politician (born 1908)
- 20 September – Alfred White Franklin, paediatrician (born 1905)
- 22 September – George Oliver, lawyer and politician (born 1888)
- 23 September – Granville West, Baron Granville-West, politician (born 1904)
- 25 September
  - Christopher Guest, Baron Guest, judge (born 1901)
  - Robert H. Thouless, psychologist (born 1894)
- 27 September – Toke Townley, actor (born 1912)
- 28 September – Gerard Wallop, 9th Earl of Portsmouth, peer and politician (born 1898)
- 29 September – J. H. C. Morris, legal scholar (born 1910)

=== October ===
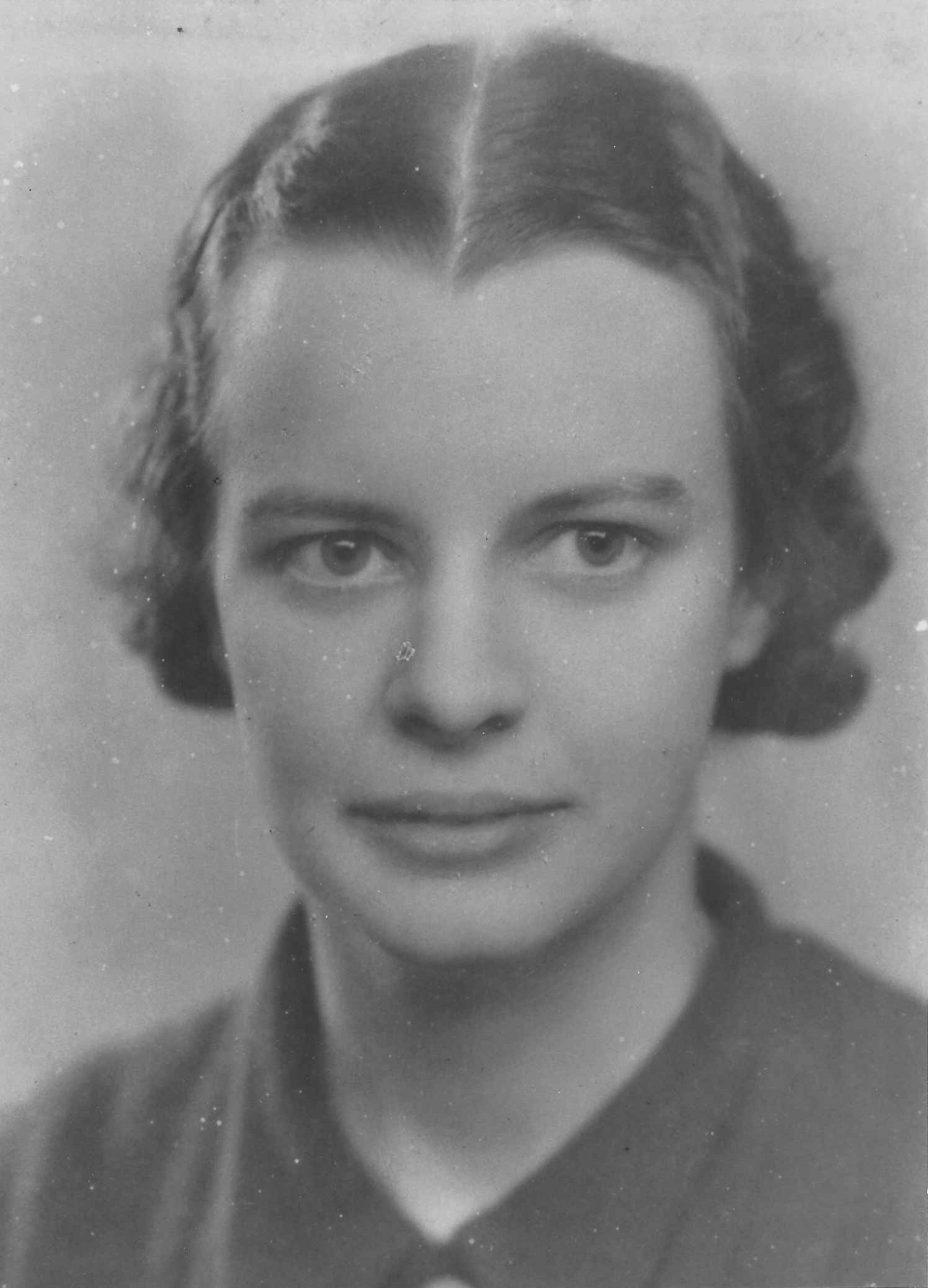
Helen Rushall

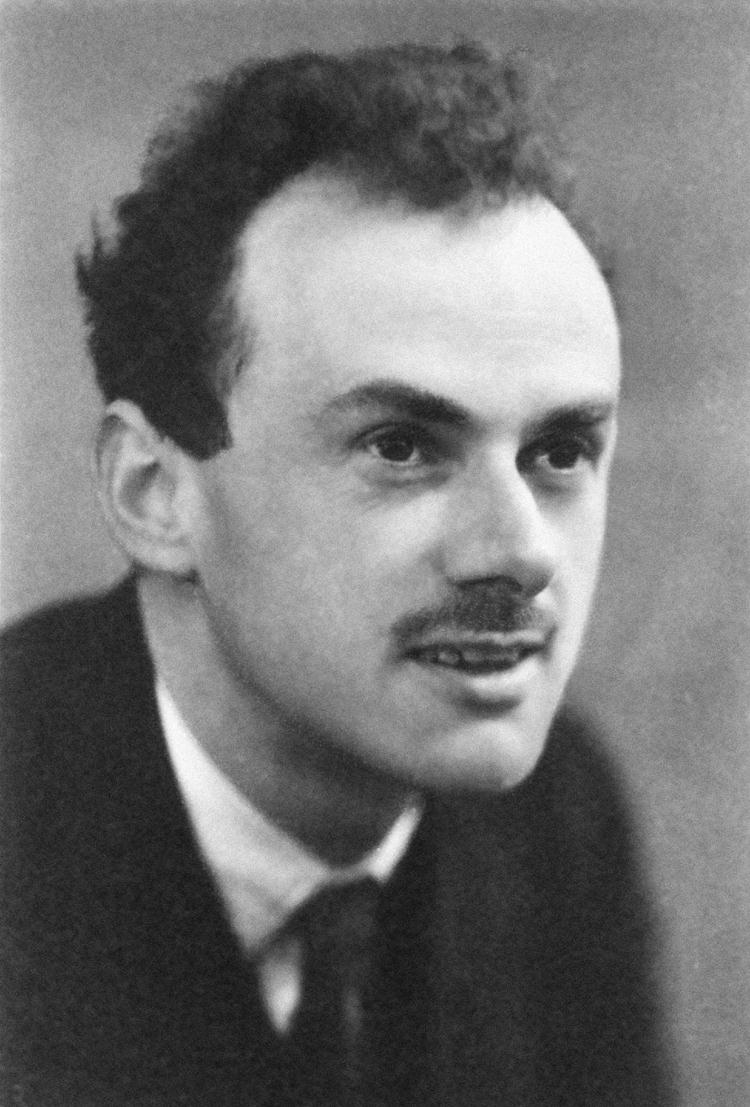
Paul Dirac

- 1 October – Jake Kilrain, boxer (born 1914)
- 4 October – George H. Marshall, teacher, author and activist (born 1916)
- 5 October – Leonard Rossiter, actor (born 1926)
- 9 October
  - C. E. Bowden, Army officer and aeromodeller (born 1897)
  - Guy Wolstenholme, golfer (born 1931)
- 10 October
  - Alan Lake, actor (suicide) (born 1940)
  - Scott Sutherland, sculptor (born 1910)
- 11 October – Norah Smallwood, publisher (born 1909)
- 12 October
  - Anthony Berry, Member of Parliament (killed in the Brighton hotel bombing) (born 1925)
  - Ernest Gates, politician (born 1903)
- 14 October – Sir Martin Ryle, radio astronomer, recipient of the Nobel Prize in Physics (born 1918)
- 15 October – Helen Rushall, teacher (born 1914)
- 16 October – Constance Warren, composer (born 1905)
- 18 October
  - Mickey Brantford, actor (born 1911)
  - Lloyd Goffe, motorcycle racer (born 1913)
- 20 October – Paul Dirac, physicist and Nobel Prize laureate (born 1902)
- 22 October – Isabel Brown, communist activist (born 1894)
- 25 October – Stanford Robinson, orchestral conductor and composer (born 1904)
- 26 October
  - Michael Babington Smith, soldier, banker and sportsman (born 1901)
  - Seaborne Davies, politician and teacher (born 1904)
  - Noel Howlett, actor (born 1902)
- 27 October – George F. Le Feuvre, Jersey-born American poet (born 1891)
- 28 October – John Davy, journalist (born 1927)
- 31 October – Peter Du Cane, boat designer (born 1901)

=== November ===
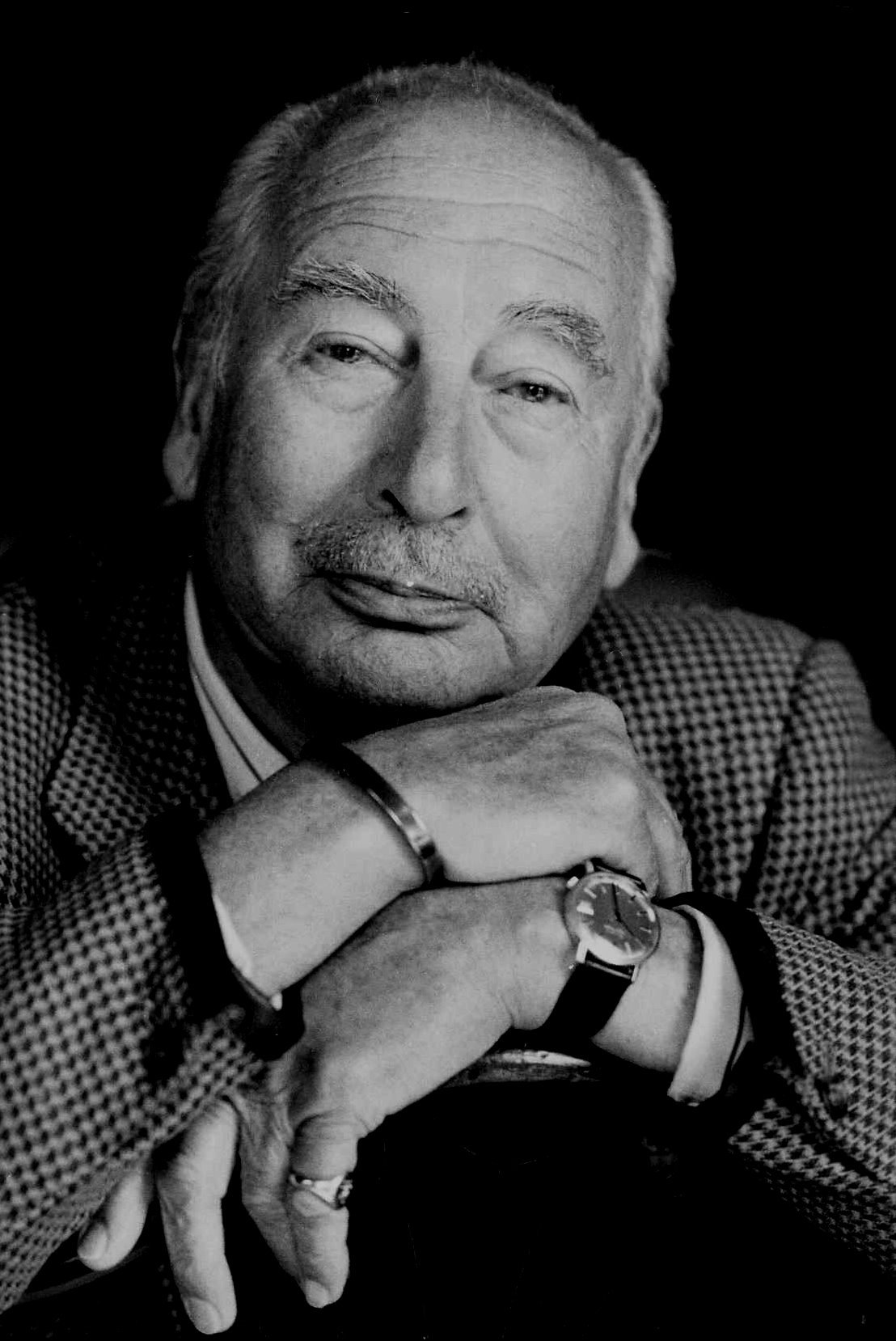
Percy Seymour, 18th Duke of Somerset

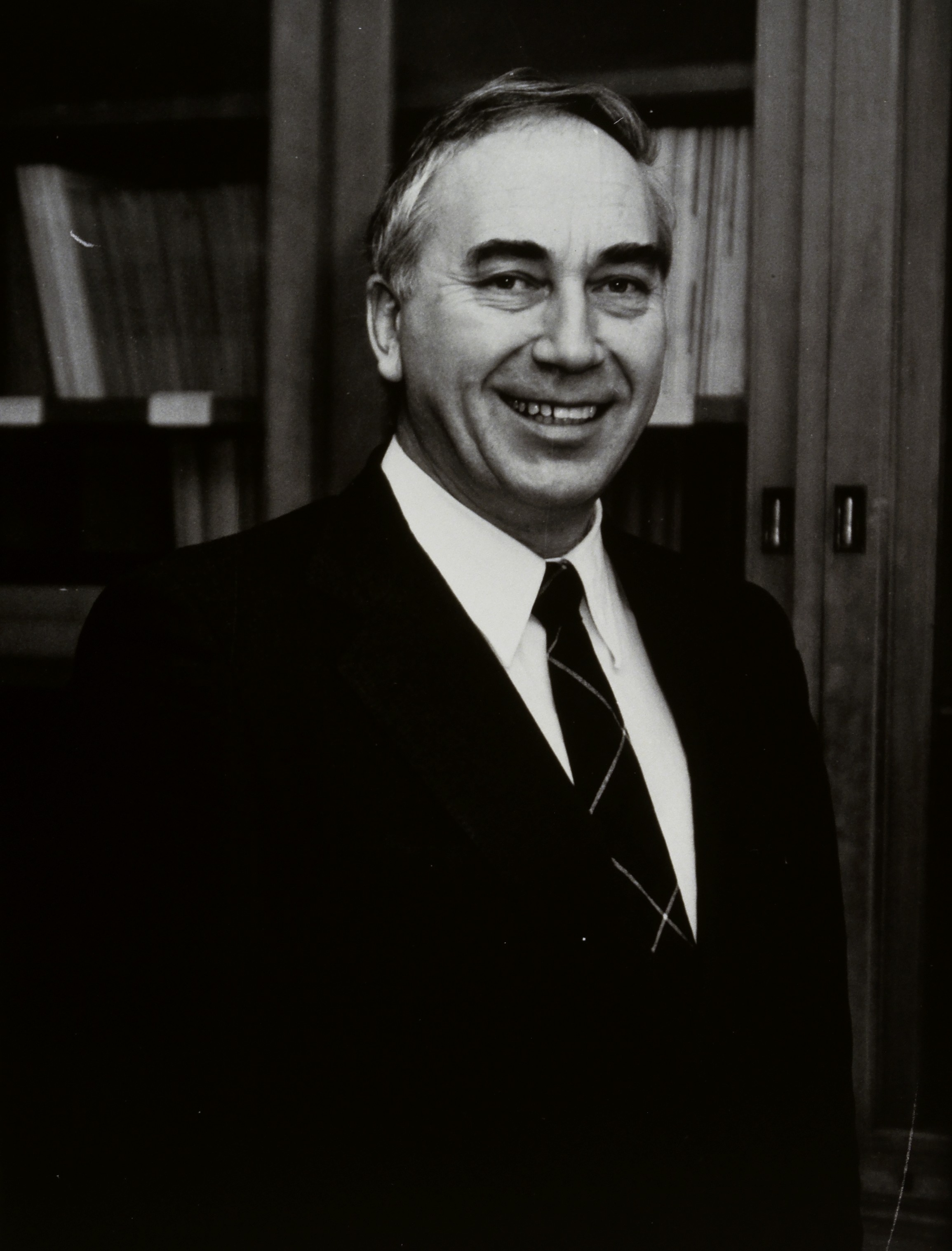
Eric G. Forbes

- 3 November – Harry McEvoy, industrialist (born 1902)
- 5 November
  - Jessie Furze, pianist and composer (born 1903)
  - Ivor Montagu, aristocrat, documentary film maker, table tennis player and Communist activist (born 1904)
- 7 November – Anita Gregory, psychologist (born 1925, Germany)
- 9 November – Sir William MacDonald, RAF air marshal (born 1908)
- 10 November
  - Owain Richards, zoologist (born 1901)
  - Louis Rosenhead, mathematician (born 1906)
- 13 November – Fred Hague, trade unionist (born 1911)
- 15 November – Percy Seymour, 18th Duke of Somerset, peer (born 1910)
- 16 November
  - Sir George Deacon, oceanographer (born 1906)
  - Philip Maynard Williams, political analyst (born 1920)
- 17 November – Harold Newgass, RNVR officer and George Cross recipient (born 1896)
- 18 November
  - Thomas Jones, Baron Maelor, politician (born 1898)
  - Kenneth Martin, painter (born 1905)
- 19 November
  - John McQuade, Northern Irish politician (born 1911)
  - Graham Russell Mitchell, World War II spy (born 1905)
- 20 November – Peter Welch, actor (born 1922)
- 21 November – Eric G. Forbes, physicist (born 1933)
- 22 November – Denis Rose, jazz musician (born 1922)
- 23 November
  - Margaret Burton, actress (born 1924)
  - William Spens, 2nd Baron Spens, peer (born 1914)
- 27 November – George Howard, Baron Howard of Henderskelfe, politician, soldier and BBC chairman (born 1920)
- 29 November – Dorothea Macnee, socialite (born 1896)
- 30 November – Edward Crankshaw, writer and translator (born 1909)

=== December ===
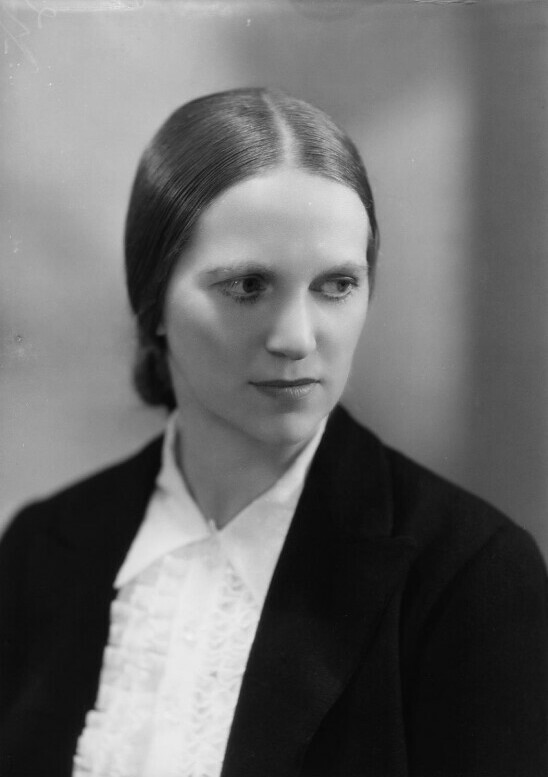
Ethel Mannin

- 2 December – Edward James, poet (born 1907)
- 4 December
  - Wyndham Davies, politician (born 1926)
  - Malcolm Shaw, comics writer (born 1946)
- 5 December
  - William Brown, Scottish army officer (born 1922)
  - Ethel Mannin, novelist, travel writer and activist (born 1900)
- 8 December – Razzle, rock drummer (car accident in the United States) (born 1960)
- 9 December – Ivor Moreton, singer and pianist (born 1908)
- 10 December – Brian Taylor, jockey (fall while racing) (born 1939)
- 11 December – Will Paynter, coal miner and union leader (born 1903)
- 14 December – Sir Walter Stansfield, police officer (born 1917)
- 15 December – Lennard Pearce, actor (born 1915)
- 19 December
  - Nigel Cornwall, clergyman (born 1903)
  - Rowland Winn, 4th Baron St Oswald, peer and politician (born 1916)
  - Hugh Seton-Watson, historian (born 1916)
- 21 December – Maurice Key, bishop (born 1905)
- 22 December – Sidney Vivian, actor (born 1901)
- 24 December
  - Ian Hendry, actor (born 1931)
  - Harry Waxman, cinematographer (born 1912)
- 25 December – Robert Stott, Army brigadier-general (born 1898)
- 26 December
  - Geoffrey Barraclough, historian (born 1908)
  - Tebbs Lloyd Johnson, speed-walker (born 1900)
- 27 December – William Black, Baron Black, coachbuilder (born 1893)
- 28 December
  - Patrick Joseph Nolan, physicist (born 1894)
  - Mary Stewart, Baroness Stewart of Alvechurch, politician and educator (born 1903)

=== Date unknown ===
- unknown – Jean Bain of Crathie, Aberdeenshire, last speaker of Deeside Gaelic (born Jean McDonald, 1890)

== See also ==
- 1984 in British music
- 1984 in British television
- List of British films of 1984
