= Alfred Newman (disambiguation) =

Alfred Newman (1900–1970) was an American composer.

Alfred Newman may also refer to:

- Alfred Newman (judge) (1834–1898), American judge
- Alfred Newman (politician) (1849–1924), New Zealand politician
- Alfred Alvarez Newman (1851–1887), English metalworker and art collector
- Alfred Newman (architect) (1875–1921), Australian architect
- Alfred Newman (Royal Navy officer) (1888–1984), awarded the Albert Medal in World War I
- Alfred K. Newman (1924–2019), United States Navajo code talker
- Alfred Newman (cyclist) (1926–1990), English cyclist

== See also ==
- Al Newman (Albert Newman, born 1960), American baseball player
- Alfred E. Neuman, fictional mascot of Mad magazine
- Alfred Neumann (disambiguation)
