= General Lejeune =

General Lejeune may refer to:

- Francis St David Benwell Lejeune (1899–1984), British Army major general
- John A. Lejeune (1867–1942), U.S. Marine Corps lieutenant general
- Louis-François Lejeune (1775–1848), French Army general
