= John Breck =

John Breck may refer to:

- John M. Breck (1828–1900), mayor of Portland, Oregon, 1861–62
- John Leslie Breck (1860–1899), American artist
- John Breck (actor) (1953–1984), Scottish actor
