= Alfred Alvarez =

Alfred Alvarez may refer to:

- Al Alvarez (1929–2019), English poet, novelist, essayist and critic
- Alfred "Chico" Alvarez (1920–1992), Canadian jazz trumpeter
- Alfred Alvarez Newman (1851–1887), English metalworker and art collector
