= Alfred Neumann =

Alfred Neumann may refer to:

- Alfred Neumann (writer) (1895–1952)
- Alfred Neumann (architect) (1900–1968)
- Alfred Neumann (East German politician) (1909–2001), politician
- Alfred R. Neumann, first president (1972–1982) of the University of Houston at Clear Lake City

== See also ==
- Alfred E. Neuman, fictional mascot of Mad magazine
- Alfred Newman (disambiguation)
