= Hywel Murrell =

Kennet Frank Hywel Murrell
- Born: 1908
- Died: 21 January 1984 (aged 75)
- Occupation: Psychologist
- Known for: Ergonomics

Hywel Murrell (1908 – 21 January 1984) was a British psychologist who introduced the term "ergonomics" to the English dictionary, created the first ergonomics department in British industry, and wrote the first British textbook on ergonomics. He also had keen interest in caving from his education at Sidcot School, becoming a founder member, and first secretary, of the Wessex Cave Club.

== Biography and work ==
Murrell graduated in chemistry. He began working on ergonomics in World War II. In 1946, while still a major in the Army, he moved to HMS Excellent, which was the Royal Navy's gunnery research and development centre. In 1947, he became head of the Naval Motion Study Unit (NMSU). As a government scientist, he headed an inter-disciplinary team studying the motions involved in handling gunnery and ammunition, the layout of equipment, and the handling of information.

In 1949, Murrell coined the term "ergonomics" and created the Ergonomics Research Society at a meeting in his office at the Admiralty. At the end of 1951, he left the NMSU and joined Tube Investments Ltd., creating the first ergonomics department in British industry. In 1954, he became professor of psychology and head of the Department of Occupational Psychology at the University of Bristol, where he researched skill development and use, ageing and fatigue. He wrote the first textbook on ergonomics in the United Kingdom.

Later, he was head of the Department of Occupational Psychology at the Cardiff University until his retirement in 1975. When the Medical Research Council saw the need to start researching occupational stress, they first engaged Murrell (already retired) to make a basic literature survey of the subject.

== Legacy ==
Murrell's work, which had an objective and experimental stance, helped ergonomics to be taken seriously and became the basis for the studies of human interaction with technology that took off in the 1950s and 1960s.

Since 1977, the Hywel Murrell Award has been given to the members of the Chartered Institute of Ergonomics and Human Factors (CIEHF) who have demonstrated excellence in their work.

== Bibliography ==
- Ergonomics: Man in His Working Environment, 1965, reprinted by Springer in 2012
