= Sylva Stuart Watson =

British actor and licensee and manager of the Theatre Royal, Haymarket

Sylva Stuart Watson (her married name (Note: When she died in 1984 the entry in the national probate register lists her names as: Carmen Sylva Watson; Sylva Carmen; Sylva Stuart; Carmen Syvla Stuart; Carmen Sylva Van Dyck Stuart; Carmen Sylva Van Dyck; Carmen Sylva Stuart-Watson)) (4 March 1894 – 26 March 1984) was licensee and manager of the Theatre Royal, Haymarket, in London, England, from 1963.

Sylva Larratt was born in 1894 in Camberwell the daughter of Herbert Arthur and Jane Larratt (née Van Dyk), she would later use the name Little Carmen Sylva when performing as child vocalist with her father who was a baritone. She married Stuart Watson in 1920 in Wandsworth.

Having been a child singer, she began her adult career singing opera and in music hall, and worked as an actress, once performing with Sybil Thorndike.

She formed the Theatre Royal Haymarket Company which included Ralph Richardson and Flora Robson.

Her father-in-law Horace Watson was previously manager of the Theatre Royal, Haymarket.

In 1969, she campaigned against the opening of theatres on Sundays, and was quoted in the House of Lords by Martin Peake, 2nd Viscount Ingleby on the matter, in 1971.

She appeared as a castaway on the BBC Radio programme Desert Island Discs on 21 August 1971, where her book choice consisted of volumes on astronomy and astrology, and her luxury item was forty yards of flowered chintz, a needle & cotton.

Watson died on 26 March 1984 in London.
