= Elaine M. Catley =

Canadian poet

- Born: November 14, 1889; Bath, Somerset, England
- Died: July 29, 1984 (aged 94); Calgary, Alberta
- Writing career
- Genre: poetry

Elaine Maud Catley (1889–1984) was a Canadian poet. She was born November 14, 1889, in Bath, Somerset, England, to Frederick Charles and Annie Matilda Clark. She attended private school in Guildford and married Sydney Catley in 1915. The couple emigrated to Canada in 1920, settling in Calgary, Alberta. Together they had four children.

Having published a book of poetry in England, Catley pursued publishing more of her work shortly after arriving in Canada. Her first poem appeared in the Calgary Herald. Others would follow in Saturday Night (magazine), Regina Leader-Post and John O'London's Weekly. She released six volumes of poetry. Included among them was Ecstasy and Other Poems, one of a series of Ryerson poetry chap-books. In a 1967 interview with the Calgary Herald, Catley explained she was able to continue writing while raising a family by finding spare moments: "I wrote whenever I could. I have written while I was in a streetcar, and I've written at two o'clock in the morning."

Catley was a 25-year member, and one-time president, of the Canadian Authors Association. She founded the association's poetry group in 1925. Catley was also a member of the Canadian Women's Press Club and an active member of the Home and School Associations. She spent her later years at George Boyack Nursing Home in Calgary. She died July 29, 1984.

== Publications ==
- Greater love and other poems (1916)
- Star dust, and other poems (1926)
- Ecstasy and other poems (1927)
- Canada calling (1938)
- Light and other poems (1960)
- At the end of the road (1974)
