= Eric G. Forbes =

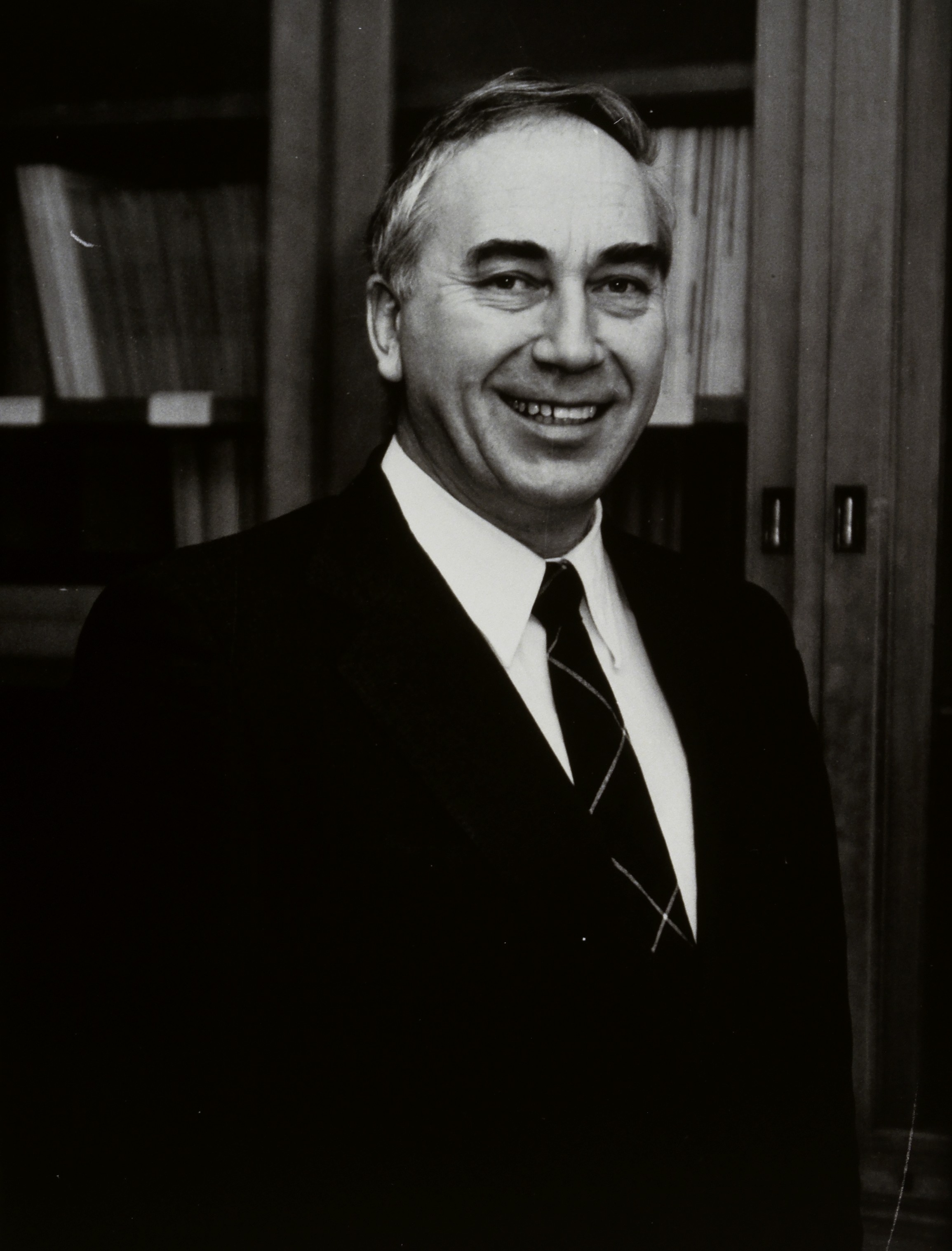
Eric Gray Forbes. Photograph.

Eric Gray Forbes (1933-1984) FRSE FRAS was Professor of the History of Science at the University of Edinburgh.

== Life ==
He was born in St. Andrews in Fife on 30 March 1933. He went to Madras College in St Andrews University and graduated BSc. He then continued as a postgraduate at St Andrews and the University of London gaining a PhD in Astronomy.

From 1961 to 1965 he lectured in mathematics and physics at St Marys College in Twickenham. In 1965 he moved to take up a post at the University of Edinburgh and was given his professorship in 1978. He did much research on longitude and navigation in the 18th century and on John Flamsteed former Astronomer Royal, and on the German scientist Tobias Mayer. He made major contributions to the 1980s project, Scotland's Cultural Heritage.

In 1984 he was elected a Fellow of the Royal Society of Edinburgh.

He died in Edinburgh on 21 November 1984. On his death his wife donated a substantial collection of his books to the University of Edinburgh

== Family ==
In 1966 he married Maria Sibilla Lürken, a German linguist. They had a daughter and a son.

== Publications ==
- The Euler-Mayer Correspondence 1751-1755 (1971)
- The Unpublished Writings of Tobias Mayer (1972)
- Mesopotamian and Greek Influence on Ancient Indian Astronomy (1977)
- The Geodetic Link Between the Greenwich and Paris Observatories in 1787 (1985)
- Tobias Mayer 1723-1762 (1980) (German translation, 1993)
- The Correspondence of John Flamsteed vol.1-3 (1995-2001)
- Roger Bacon’s Science of Experience
