= John Brough (orientalist) =

Scottish scholar of Sanskrit, Indologist, Buddhologist and Sinologist

Brough in 1961.

John Brough, FBA (31 August 1917 – 9 January 1984) was a Scottish scholar of Sanskrit, Indologist, Buddhologist and Sinologist. He was Professor of Sanskrit at the University of London (1948–67) and at the University of Cambridge (1967–84).

== Early life and education ==
Brough was born on 31 August 1917 in Dundee, the son of Charles and Elizabeth Brough. He attended the High School of Dundee before reading classics at the University of Edinburgh; studying under Arthur Berriedale Keith, he took papers in Sanskrit and graduated with a first-class MA degree in 1939. He then studied classics at St John's College, Cambridge, completing part 2 of the Tripos in 1940 (placing in the first-class) and then studying for the oriental languages Tripos, in part 2 of which he also placed in the first-class in 1942 (for which he studied Sanskrit and Pali). Among his teachers was Sir Harold Bailey.

== Career ==
Brough's performance at Cambridge earned him an exhibition, the University of Cambridge's Brotherton Prize, and the Hutchinson Studentship at St John's College. Although he worked in agriculture and then in agricultural research (1943–44) during the Second World War, he set to work editing late Vedic texts on the Brahmins and Nepalese Buddhist texts. His efforts saw him awarded the DLitt from the University of Edinburgh in 1945. In the meantime, he had been appointed (1944) assistant keeper in the Department of Oriental Printed Books and Manuscripts in the British Museum. Alongside that post, he was also a research fellow at St John's College, Cambridge, for a year from 1945 to 1946.

In 1946, Brough left his post at the British Museum and was appointed to a lectureship in Sanskrit at the School of Oriental and African Studies in the University of London. Two years later, he was appointed to the second Professorship of Sanskrit in the University of London. He was also head of the Department of India, Pakistan and Ceylon in succession to Seymour Vesey-Fitzgerald. Brough published Selections from Classical Sanskrit Literature (1951), The Early Brahmanical System of Gotra and Pravara (1953), The Gāndhārī Dharmapada (1962) and Il Regno di Shan-Shan: Una Tappa nel Viaggio del Buddhismo dall'India alla Cina (1965). He served as president of the Philological Society from 1960 to 1963 and, in the meantime, was also director of the Royal Asiatic Society from 1961 to 1962. In 1967, he left his chair in London to take up the Professorship of Sanskrit at the University of Cambridge, which he held with a professorial fellowship at St John's College. He remained in the chair until his death in an accident on 9 January 1984. During this time, the advent of new courses on modern Indian languages led to fewer students taking Sanskrit; the university took the decision that Brough's chair would lapse after his appointment ended, and so he became its last holder. While at Cambridge, he published Poems from the Sanskrit (1968). Across his career, he also wrote over 30 articles and chapters, and many more book reviews. He was elected a fellow of the British Academy in 1961 and, in an obituary, K. R. Norman described him as "one of the greatest among Western Indologists of the twentieth century".

== Works ==
John Brough has written numerous books and articles. Some of them are mentioned here.

- Thus Have I Heard..., Bulletin of the School of Oriental and African Studies, Volume 13. No 2, Cambridge University Press, 1950, pp. 416-426.
- The early Brahmanical system of gotra and pravara:a translation of the "Gotra-pravara-mañjarī" of Puruṣottama-Paṇḍita. Cambridge University Press. 1953. p. 248. ISBN 9781107623989.
- A Kharoṣṭhī inscription from China., Cambridge University Press, Bulletin of the School of Oriental and African Studies, University of London, Vol. 24. No. 3, pp.517-530, 1961.
- The Chinese pseudo-translation of Ārya-śūra's Jātaka-mālā., Asia Major, 1964, pp.27-53.
- Poems from the Sanskrit. Penguin Books. 1968. p. 164.
- Selections from classical Sanskrit literature. School of Oriental and African studies, University of London. 1978. p. 157. ISBN 0728600501.
- The Gāndhārī dharmapada. Motilal Banarsidass Publisher. 2000. p. 319. ISBN 9788120817401. First edition by Oxford University Press in 1962.
