= Peg Maltby =

Australian illustrator and cartoonist (1899–1984)

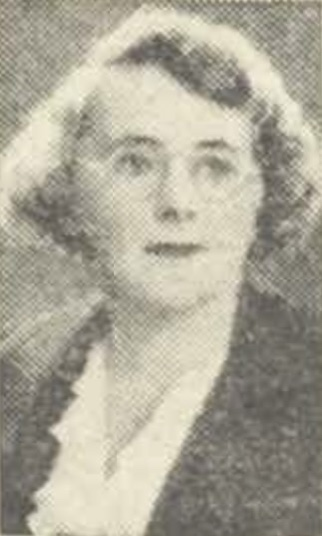
- Maltby c. 1937
- Born: Agnes Newberry Orchard; 17 January 1899; Leicestershire, England
- Died: 12 March 1984 (aged 85); Camberwell, Victoria, Australia
- Notable work: Peg's Fairy Book

Peg Maltby (17 January 1899 – 12 March 1984) was an English-born Australian book illustrator and children's writer. She is best known for Peg's Fairy Book, first published in 1944, which sold more than 180,000 copies in the 1940s and 1950s.

== Life ==
Born Agnes Newberry Orchard in Leicestershire, England on 17 January 1899, she married George Bradley Maltby in 1917. They moved to Australia in 1924.

Maltby held several exhibitions of her artwork, including at Newman's Gallery in Melbourne in 1934, where it was reported that her pen and colour drawings were in the style of Arthur Rackham and The Bulletin's art critic wrote that she "has the needful imagination to work out dainty scenes as acceptable to adults as to children and swing back the mature cynic to his infantile faith in fairies".

In 1937, while visiting her parents in England, she created illustrations of "gum leaves and quaint folklore scenes" for a London company, who were interested in her work.

Her first books, Peg's Fairy Book and Introducing Pip and Pepita and Pepita's Baby were published in 1944. She began a series of books featuring a pair of pixies named Ben and Bella in 1947, some of which were republished by Angus and Robertson in 1982 as The adventures of Ben & Bella.

In the 1950s Maltby's book sales were impacted by imported publications, so she and her husband opened Santa's Workshop and a Fairyland Emporium in her studio at Olinda, Victoria. Over 6,000 children and adults had visited the displays of paintings and dioramas by December 1954.

Angus & Robertson published a new edition of Peg's Fairy Book in 1976 and The Australian Women's Weekly announced that Maltby's "pixies are making a comeback – and publishing history – as a new generation of children are being enchanted by them." Additional interest in her work was generated when Myer Melbourne held an exhibition of her work in November and Peg's Fairy Book was used for Myer's Christmas displays throughout their Australian stores that year. The Australian Women's Weekly also held a colouring competition, using her work as its theme and offering two trips to Disneyland to the age-group winners and signed copies of the book as other prizes.

The Australian National Botanic Gardens in Canberra held an exhibition, "Snugglepot and Cuddlepie and Other Folk of the Australian Bush", which displayed Maltby's work alongside that of May Gibbs.

== Selected works ==
=== As author and illustrator ===
- Introducing Pip and Pepita, 1944
- Peg's Fairy Book, 1944
- Nutchen of the Forest, 1945
- Meet Mr. Cobbledick!, 1948
- The Little World of Peg Maltby, 1982
- Adventures of Ben and Bella, 1982

=== As illustrator ===
- Speak well books, by Ellie P. Colclough, 2 vols, 1944
- Australian honeyeaters, by Hugh R. Officer, Alex Stirling (map), 1964
