= John Breck (actor) =

Scottish actor

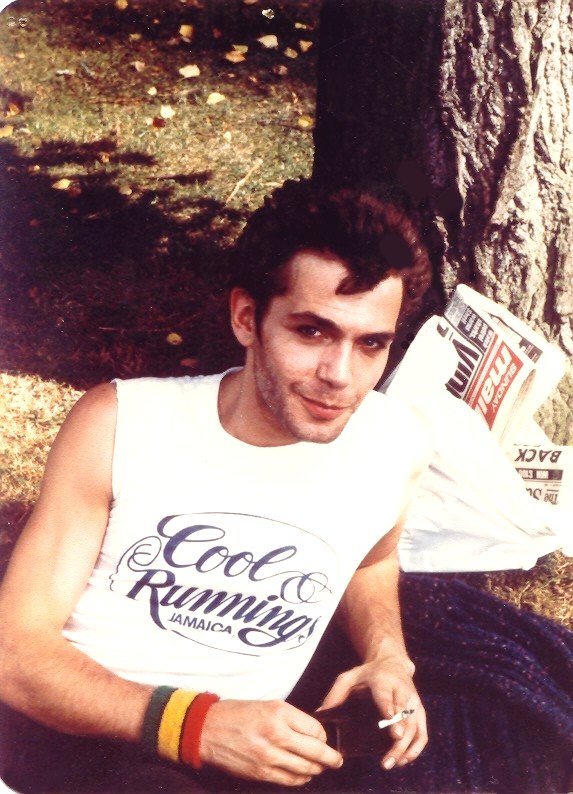
- Born: John Breck; 24 December 1953; Glasgow, Scotland
- Died: 8 January 1984 (aged 30)
- Other name: John Doyle
- Occupation: Actor
- Notable work: The Last Days of Mankind; A Waste of Time

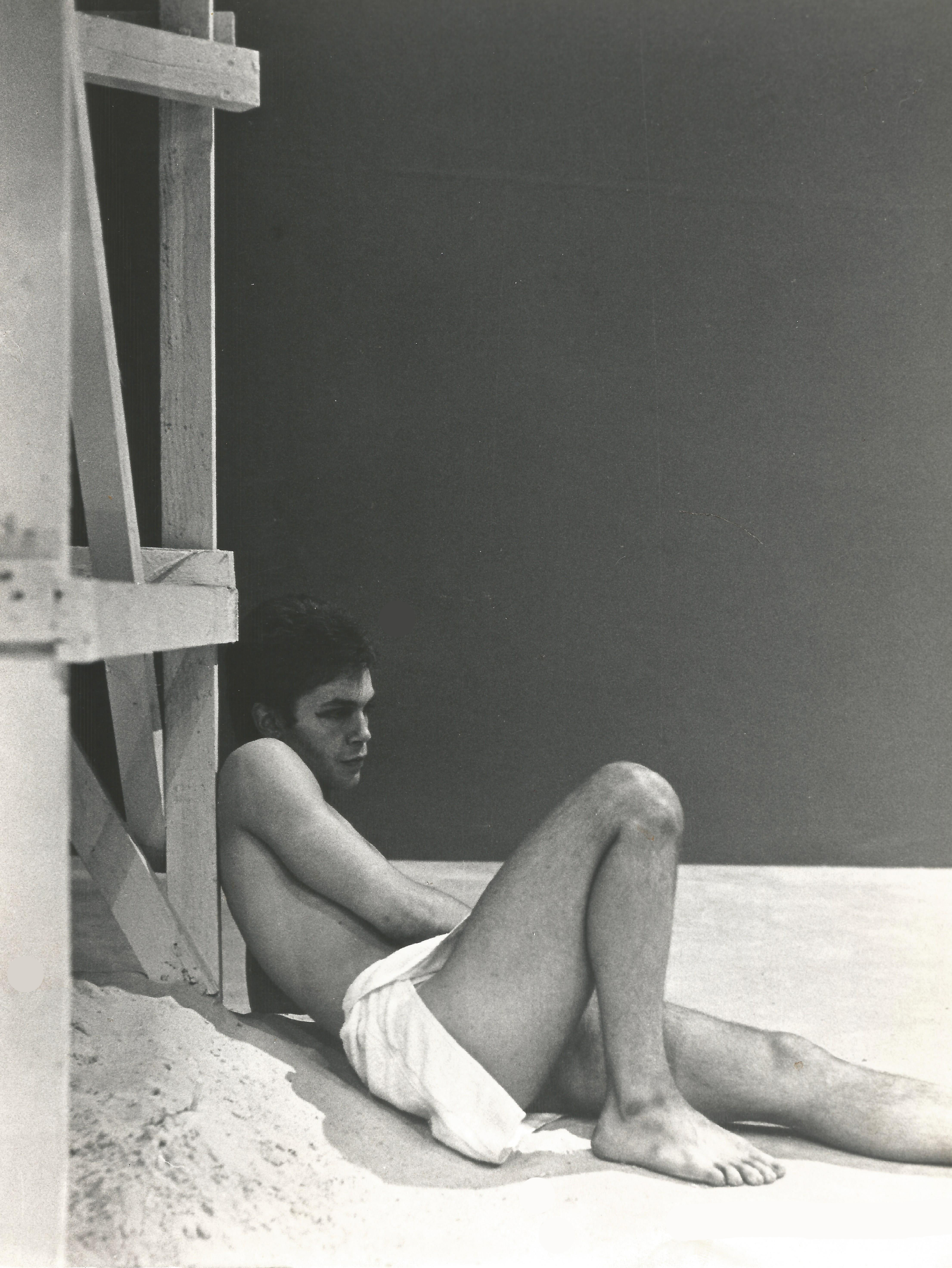
John Breck in the Citizens' Company production of Chinchilla by Robert David MacDonald. Photograph by John Vere Brown, by kind permission of the Citizens Theatre.

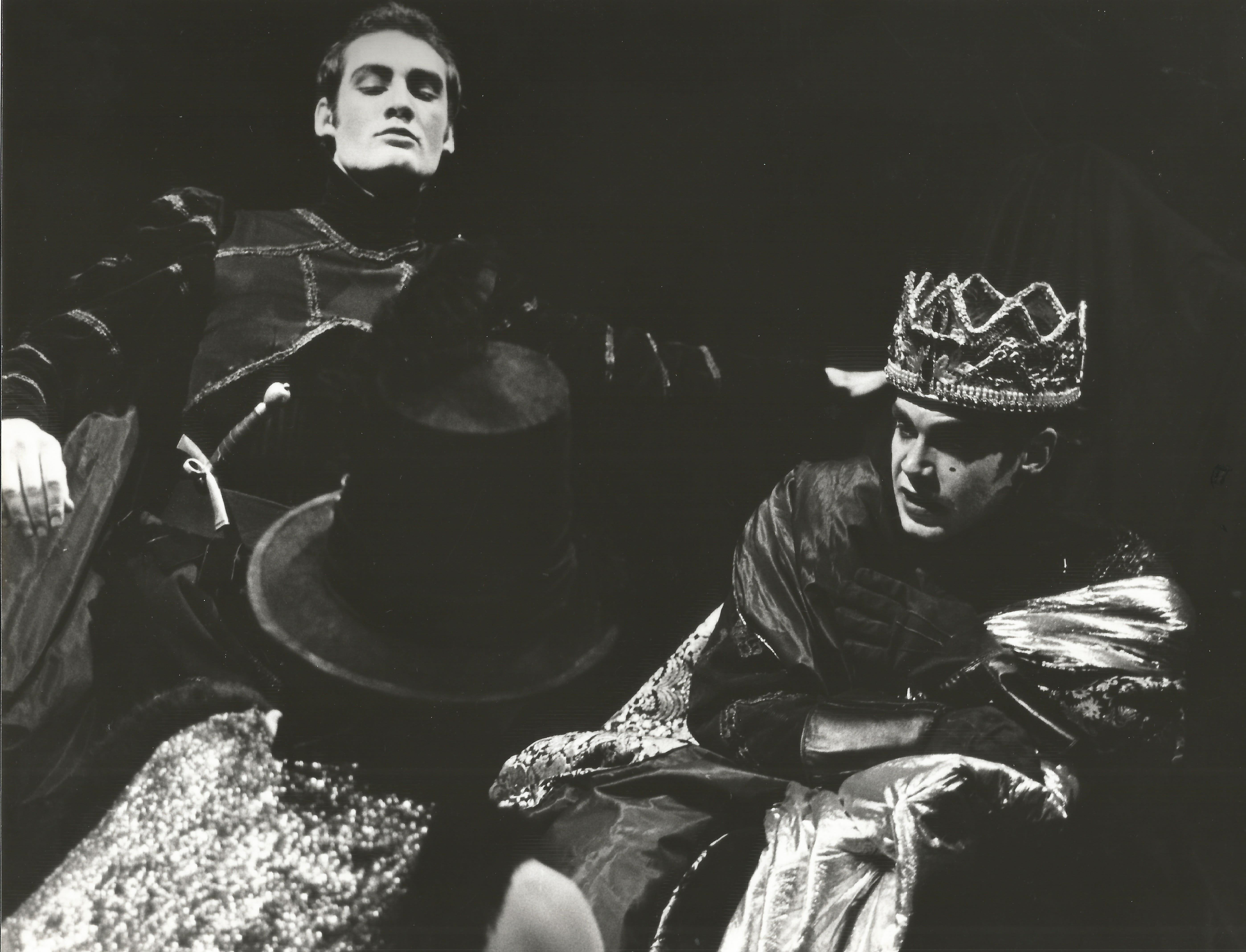
John Breck in the Citizens' Company production of The Massacre at Paris by Christopher Marlowe. Photograph by John Vere Brown, by kind permission of the Citizens Theatre.

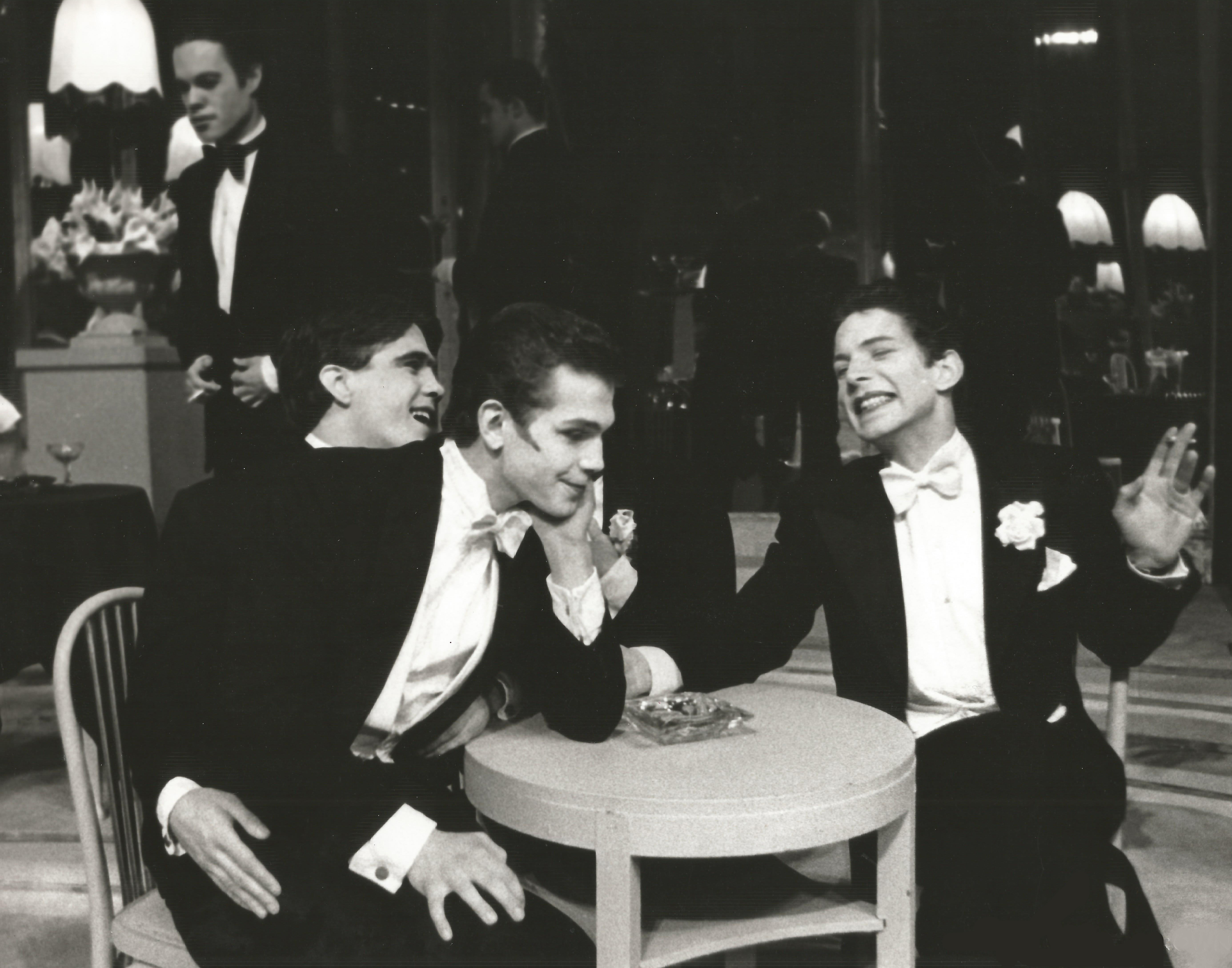
John Breck in the Citizens' Company production of Semi-Monde by Noël Coward. Photograph by John Vere Brown, by kind permission of the Citizens Theatre.

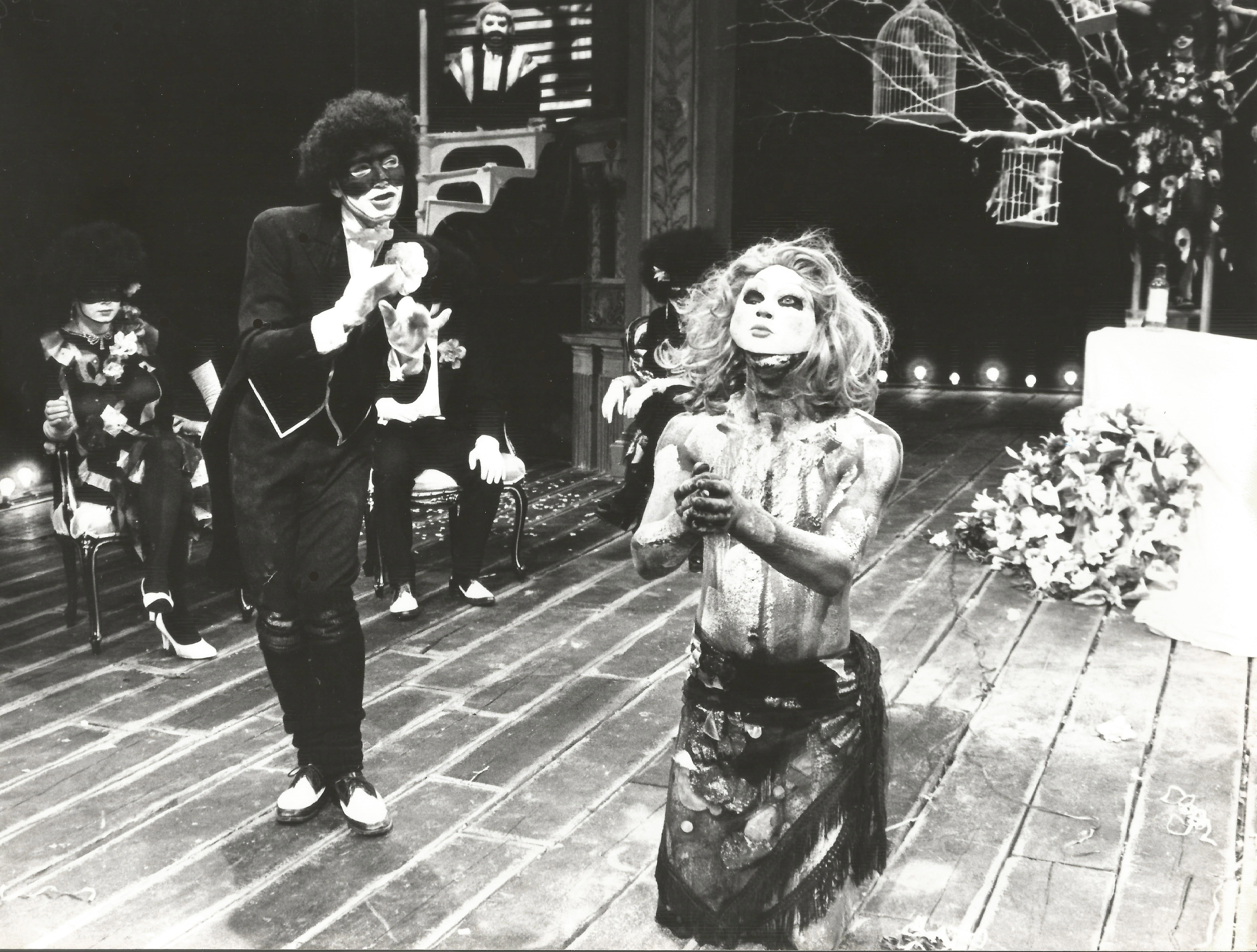
John Breck in the Citizens' Company production of The Blacks by Jean Genet. Photograph by John Vere Brown, by kind permission of the Citizens Theatre.

John Breck (John Doyle) (24 December 1953 – 8 January 1984) was a Scottish actor of Irish-Italian parentage, born in Glasgow on 24 December 1953. His parents were Clara Zanotti Doyle and Alexander Doyle.

== Early life ==
Breck attended school in Glasgow at St Peter's Primary, St Mungo's Academy and St Thomas Aquinas prior to undertaking a number of jobs including working as a bus conductor for Glasgow Corporation. Having taken a post as a temporary stagehand at the Citizens Theatre, he was asked by co-Artistic Director Philip Prowse to appear as a non-speaking extra onstage in a number of productions. Breck's non-professional performances led to him acquiring more prominent roles until he was granted his Equity card and became a professional actor. Equity already had a member registered as John Doyle and so he adopted the Equity name John Breck.

=== Citizens Theatre ===
As John Breck, he appeared at the Citizens Theatre, and on tour with the Citizens Company worldwide, in many productions including Carlo Goldoni's Country Life, The Good Humoured Ladies, The Impresario From Smyrna and The Battlefield, Karl Kraus' The Last Days of Mankind, Robert David MacDonald's A Waste of Time (based on Proust's A la recherche du temps perdu), Chinchilla, Summit Conference, Don Juan and Webster, James Hadley Chase's No Orchids for Miss Blandish, Noël Coward's Semi-Monde and Sirocco, William Shakespeare's Macbeth, Hamlet and The Merchant of Venice, Philip Massinger's The Roman Actor, Shaun Lawton's Desperado Corner, Vernon Sylvaine's Madame Louise, John Ford and John Webster's Painter's Palace of Pleasure, Hofmannsthal's Rosenkavalier, Genet's The Balcony, The Screens and The Blacks, Bertolt Brecht's The Caucasian Chalk Circle and The Mother, Sean O'Casey's Red Roses For Me, The Marquis de Sade's Philosophy in the Boudoir, Chekhov's The Seagull, Brecht/Weill's The Threepenny Opera, John Fletcher and Philip Massinger's The Custom of The Country, Christopher Marlowe's The Massacre at Paris, and many of the Citizens' annual Christmas shows.

In 1979, Breck originated the role of Phil McCann in the second part of John Byrne's The Slab Boys Trilogy, then called The Loveliest Night of the Year/Threads (now entitled Cuttin' A Rug). The production, directed by David Hayman, premiered at Edinburgh's Traverse Theatre in August 1979 and went on to appear in London.

==== Death ====
John Breck enjoyed a successful acting career until he died very suddenly, aged 30, on 8 January 1984, of Haemophilus B influenza. Breck is buried in Glasgow next to his parents.
