= Alfred Alvarez Newman =

English metalworker and art collector

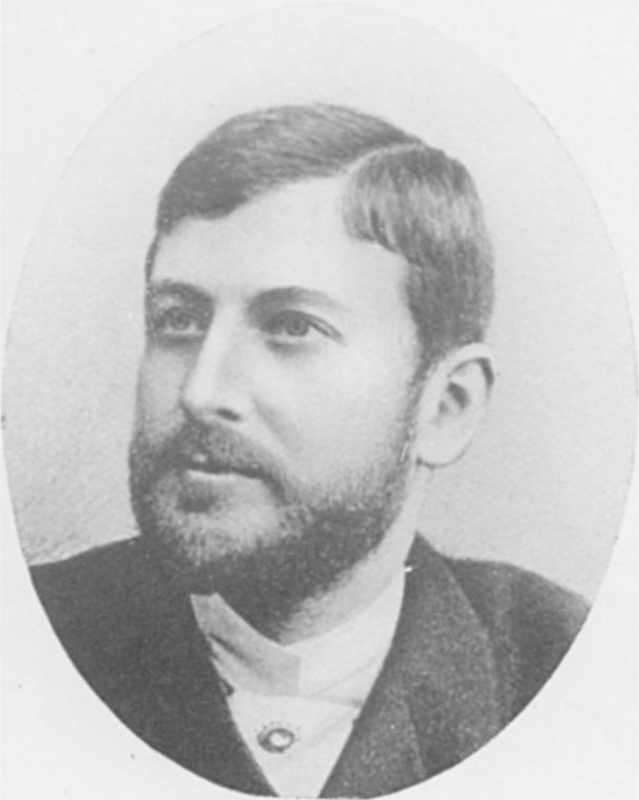
- Born: 1851; London, United Kingdom
- Died: 21 January 1887 (aged 35–36); London, United Kingdom
- Occupations: Metal craftsman, art collector, antiquary
- Spouse: Theresa Dora Saunders (m. 1882)

Alfred Alvarez Newman (1851 – 21 January 1887), also known as Alfred Abraham, was an English metalworker and art collector.

He was the founder of the picturesque Old English Smithy on Archer Street, Haymarket, which became a place of fashionable resort during the "London season." Among his clients were the Dukes of Westminster and Norfolk, the Marquis of Northampton, Louisa de Rothschild, Coutts Lindsay, and Lawrence Alma-Tadema.

Newman's interests included Anglo-Jewish history and archaeology, and was the author of several papers communicated to the Society of Architects and similar bodies. He possessed a unique collection of Jewish prints and tracts bearing on these subjects, which was acquired by Asher Isaac Meyers after his death.

Newman was an organizer of the Anglo-Jewish Historical Exhibition of 1887, at which much of his collection was exhibited after his death, and was among the first to give his support to the formation of the Jewish Historical Society of England, which was afterwards founded in 1893. It was due largely to Newman's efforts that a proposal to demolish the Bevis Marks Synagogue was eventually defeated.
