= Alfred Newman (Royal Navy officer) =

Commander Alfred William Newman GC (11 April 1888 – 1 September 1984) was a British recipient of the Albert Medal. He was awarded the Albert Medal for Gallantry in Saving Life at Sea in 1918. The medal was later translated to a George Cross.

He was born at Prebendal House in Empingham in the county of Rutland on 11 April 1888, the second son of Miles William Newman and Jessie (née Reay). His father was agent to the Earl of Ancaster and his grandfather Joseph James Newman was also employed on the Ancaster estate at Normanton. He joined the Royal Navy on 5 August 1903, aged 15.

Newman served at the Battle of Heligoland Bight in 1914 and was appointed acting mate of the R Class destroyer HMS Tetrarch in June 1917.

On 10 October 1917 an alarm of fire was given in the after magazine of the Tetrarch. Newman, who was on the upper deck, proceeded to the magazine as soon as he heard the alarm and seeing smoke issuing from a box of cordite, opened the lid and passed the cartridges on to the upper deck, where they were thrown into the sea. One cartridge in the middle of the box was very hot and smoke was issuing from its end. It is considered that by his prompt and gallant action, Newman saved the magazine from being blown up and the loss of many lives.

Newman was personally presented with the Albert Medal by King George V on board HMS Curaçao at Harwich on 8 March 1918. The award was published in The London Gazette, 5 March 1918.

He retired from service being placed on the Royal Navy retired list in August 1922, was promoted to lieutenant commander (retired) in June 1927 and regularly attended specialised Royal Navy courses for the construction of boom and harbour defences. He was recalled in 1939 because of his knowledge of boom defence work and was based in West Africa, Aden and Malta during World War II. After the war he was responsible for clearing a number of wrecks from Malta's Grand Harbour, including the oil tanker, SS Ohio. Commander Newman retired in 1948 to East Grinstead, where he died on 1 September 1984 (Obituaries: The Times 11 September 1984, The Daily Telegraph 5 September 1984).

In 1971 all living holders of the Albert Medal were invited to exchange the award for the George Cross. On being exchanged, the original medal was presented to the National Maritime Museum. The Museum also holds his George Cross and other medals on loan.
