= Francis St David Benwell Lejeune =

British Army general

Major-General Francis St David Benwell Lejeune CB CBE
- Born: 1 March 1899
- Died: 1 June 1984 (aged 85)
- Military career
- Allegiance: United Kingdom
- Branch: British Army
- Rank: Major-General
- Unit: Royal Artillery
- Conflicts: First World War, Second World War
- Awards: CB, CBE

Major-General Francis St David Benwell Lejeune CB CBE (1 March 1899 – 1 June 1984) was a senior British Army officer during the Second World War.

== Biography ==
Born on 1 March 1899, Francis St David Benwell Lejeune was educated at Bedford School and the Royal Military Academy, Woolwich. He received his first commission as a second lieutenant in the Royal Artillery in 1917 and served in France and Belgium during the First World War. He was seconded to the Royal Air Force between 1920 and 1924, and served in operations in Somaliland and Iraq. He was Assistant Military Attaché in Washington between 1932 and 1934, and International Commissioner during the Spanish Civil War between 1937 and 1939. During the Second World War he served in Italy and Burma. He was promoted to the rank of major general, appointed as Chief of Staff of Anti-Aircraft Command and Commander of Anti-Aircraft Group in 1944, as Director of Technical Training at the War Office in 1946, and as President of the Ordnance Board in 1947. He retired from the British Army in 1949, and served on the staff of NATO between 1952 and 1962.

Lejeune was invested as a Commander of the Order of the British Empire in 1944 and as a Companion of the Order of the Bath in 1949. He died on 1 June 1984.
