= 1984 in British television =

This is a list of British television related events from 1984.

== Events ==
=== January ===
- 4 January – Pat Phoenix leaves Coronation Street for the second and final time as Elsie Tanner as she goes to live with old flame Bill Gregory in Portugal, having been in the show since its inception in 1960 (except for a three-year period between 1973 and 1976). The actress dies peacefully in her sleep at the age of 62 in September 1986.
- 8 January – BBC1 begins showing the romantic American miniseries The Thorn Birds, starring Richard Chamberlain, Rachel Ward and Christopher Plummer.
- 7 January
  - Fraggle Rock makes its UK debut on ITV, nearly a year after airing in the US and Canada. The series is a co-production by TVS, CBC, HBO and Henson Associates.
  - Daytime Ceefax transmissions are renamed Pages from Ceefax following the decision by Radio Times to begin listing daytime Ceefax broadcasts.
- 9 January
  - British-made children's animated series Towser makes its debut on ABC in Australia, several months before debuting in the UK.
  - Debut of the ITV British Raj period drama The Jewel in the Crown, based on Paul Scott's The Raj Quartet novels and starring Art Malik.
- 16 January – Satellite Television Limited is renamed Sky Channel.
- 19 January – The nature documentary series The Living Planet premieres on BBC1.
- 20 January – Grange Hill airs the episode in which the character of Jeremy Irvine dies in a swimming pool stunt gone wrong.
- 30 January – The BBC's Panorama documentary series airs "Maggie's Militant Tendency" which claims links between several Conservative MPs and far-right organisations both in Britain and Europe. Two of the MPs named, Neil Hamilton and Gerald Howarth, subsequently sue the BBC for slander. In 1986, after the BBC withdraws from the case, Hamilton is awarded £20,000 in damages.
- 31 January – The long-running comedy sketch show Alas Smith and Jones, starring Mel Smith and Griff Rhys Jones, makes its debut on BBC2.

=== February ===
- 6 February – The short-lived American action series Blue Thunder, based on the 1983 hit movie of the same name, makes its UK debut on BBC1.
- 14 February
  - The first of six episodes of Tom Keating On Impressionism, a follow-up to the award-winning Tom Keating On Painters, is broadcast two days after Keating's death, from a heart attack, at age 66.
  - An estimated 24 million viewers watch Torvill and Dean win gold at the 1984 Winter Olympics skating to Ravel's Boléro.
- 26 February – Debut of the long-running satirical puppet comedy series Spitting Image on ITV.

=== March ===
- 10 March – The American teenage science-fiction series Whiz Kids makes its UK debut on ITV, airing as a Saturday feature in most ITV regions. Exceptions are Ulster which airs the series on Sundays and TVS which airs it at a later date.
- 16 March – Peter Davison's last serial as the Fifth Doctor in Doctor Who, The Caves of Androzani, finishes; Colin Baker becomes the Sixth Doctor in the same episode.
- 22 March
  - Colin Baker makes his first full appearance as the Sixth Doctor in the Doctor Who serial The Twin Dilemma.
  - Horse racing is shown on Channel 4 for the first time.
- 24 March – Game show The Price Is Right makes its UK debut on ITV. It is produced by Central in association with Mark Goodson Productions and Talbot Television and is presented by Leslie Crowther.
- 26 March – Return of the 1950s panel game show What's My Line? after twenty years, with original host Eamonn Andrews in the chair, now on ITV.
- 29 March – The Entertainment Network, Music Box and Screensport launch on cable.
- 31 March – Pop group Matt Bianco appear on BBC1's Saturday Superstore, when a phone-in caller verbally abuses them by calling them "a bunch of wankers" live on air.

=== April ===
- 5 April – Industrial action by members of the Entertainments Trade Alliance results in all of today's BBC1 programmes being cancelled.
- 15 April – Comedian and magician Tommy Cooper dies from a heart attack on live television at the age of 63, during Live from Her Majesty's.
- 21 April
  - ITV screens the 1983 television movie Return of the Man from U.N.C.L.E., with Robert Vaughn and David McCallum reprising their roles from the 1960s' spy series.
  - The Saturday Picture Show replaces Get Set as the BBC's Summer Saturday morning magazine show. Its running time is extended, beginning earlier at 8:45am.
- 22 April – The network television premiere of Hugh Hudson's 1981 Oscar-winning biographical drama film Chariots of Fire on BBC1, starring Ben Cross, Ian Charleson, Nigel Davenport, John Gielgud, Patrick Magee, Nigel Havers, Ian Holm and Alice Krige.
- 27 April – The Wind in the Willows makes its debut as a full series on ITV; Ian Carmichael is now cast as narrator with Peter Sallis taking over the voice of Rat.
- 28 April – ITV airs the first episode of Robin of Sherwood, produced by HTV and starring Michael Praed as Robin Hood and featuring Ray Winstone, with music by the Irish celtic band Clannad.

=== May ===
- 4 May – A football match from England’s second tier is televised live for the first time as BBC’s Match Of The Day Live features the promotion battle between Manchester City and Chelsea.
- 5 May – ITV regions (except Central) screen Galactica 1980 (aka Conquest of the Earth), the second feature length TV movie sequel to Battlestar Galactica. The short-lived series itself isn't shown on ITV until 29 September 1984.
- 6 May – Debut of the long-running light entertainment series Surprise Surprise on ITV, presented by Cilla Black.
- 10 May – The five-part BBC Schools French language adventure series La Marée et ses Secrets (The Tide and its Secrets) is first broadcast which is repeated each year until 1993. The series continues on 14 June.
- 12 May – The short-lived American science-fiction series Automan makes its UK debut on BBC1, starring Desi Arnaz Jr., Chuck Wagner, Heather McNair and Robert Lansing.
- 16 May – ITV airs the network television premiere of the 1980 romantic time travel film drama Somewhere in Time, starring Christopher Reeve and Jane Seymour.
- 28 May – BBC1 airs the network television premiere of Harold Ramis' 1980 American sports comedy film Caddyshack, starring Chevy Chase, Bill Murray, Michael O'Keefe, Cindy Morgan, Rodney Dangerfield and Ted Knight while ITV premiers the 1980 animated sports film Animalympics.

=== June ===
- 4 June
  - The hit animated series Danger Mouse is broadcast on children's cable network Nickelodeon in the US, becoming the first British cartoon to air on that channel and one of the earliest to be in syndication there.
  - The short-lived American fantasy series Manimal makes its UK debut on BBC1, starring Simon MacCorkindale.
- 7 June – The first edition of Crimewatch UK is broadcast on BBC1. The first case to be featured on the show is the murder of Colette Aram which had occurred the previous year. A man is finally charged with the murder in 2009 and is sentenced to life imprisonment in January 2010 after pleading guilty.
- 12–27 June – Live coverage of the 1984 European Championship is shown only on the BBC, with ITV coverage restricted to highlights on World Of Sport and same night highlights of a semi-final (which is scheduled as a last minute programme change). Only two matches are shown live – a group game and the final.
- 19 June – The final episode of Ben Elton's anarchic comedy series The Young Ones is broadcast on BBC2 in spectacular fashion by blowing up the entire cast after briefly surviving a bus crash.
- 23 June – ITV airs the rock concert New Brighton Rock recorded at the event staged in the seaside resort of New Brighton, Merseyside over two days on 21 and 22 May.

=== July ===
- 27 July – The final edition of Sixty Minutes is broadcast on BBC1, ending less than a year after it first went on the air.
- 28–29 July – BBC2 hosts Jazz on a Summer's Day, a weekend of programmes devoted to jazz music.
- 28 July–12 August – The BBC airs the 1984 Summer Olympic Games. Due to the Games taking place in Los Angeles, BBC1 stays on the air into the night to provide live coverage of the major events.
- 30 July
  - BBC1's teatime news programme reverts to its original name of Evening News and to its original broadcast time of 5:40pm. The regional news programmes follow broadcasting for 20 minutes from 5:55pm. This is a stop-gap measure and continues for five weeks until the launch of BBC1's new teatime newshour.
  - ITV begins airing Kenneth Johnson's American science-fiction miniseries "V" and "V" The Final Battle. The alien invasion drama starring Marc Singer, Faye Grant, Jane Badler and Robert Englund is shown over five consecutive nights.

=== August ===
- 4–13 August – During the second week of the 1984 Summer Olympic Games, the BBC extends its live coverage until around 4am. Rather than closing down, they fill the gap with Ceefax Olympics AM which provides news from the Games to fill the gap between the end of live coverage and the start of Olympic Breakfast Time. This is the first time that Ceefax pages are broadcast overnight.
- 6 August – ITV screens the UK terrestrial premiere of the 1979 horror film The Amityville Horror, starring James Brolin and Margot Kidder.
- 25 August – ITV shows the 1978 action comedy film Every Which Way but Loose, starring Clint Eastwood as a bare-knuckle brawler, accompanied by Clyde, his pet orangutan.
- 25–26 August – For the second time, BBC2 Rocks Around the Clock.
- 27 August
  - The network television premiere of the 1979 gangster film The Long Good Friday on ITV, starring Bob Hoskins and Helen Mirren.
  - Technicians at Thames walk out on strike over the use of new cameras and editing equipment along with overtime payments for transmission staff. The strike lasts for two weeks but the station is off the air for just one day over the August Bank Holiday weekend. Management and administration staff take over their roles, broadcasting a skeleton service.
- 31 August – ITV begins airing the French/American children's cartoon series Inspector Gadget.

=== September ===
- 1 September
  - The Children's Channel and Premiere launch on cable.
  - Debut of the game show Bob's Full House on BBC1, presented by Bob Monkhouse.
- 2 September – The two-part American miniseries Lace makes its debut on ITV, starring Phoebe Cates.
- 3 September
  - BBC1's teatime news hour is relaunched and now runs from 6pm until 7pm. A new 30-minute long news programme the Six O'Clock News is launched and this is followed by a longer regional news magazine which is expanded to 25 minutes.
  - The network television premiere of the 1979 science fiction adventure film Star Trek: The Motion Picture on ITV, starring William Shatner, Leonard Nimoy, DeForest Kelley and Persis Khambatta.
- 5 September – ITV begins showing the horror-themed anthology series Hammer House of Mystery and Suspense.
- 7 September – Les Dawson becomes the new host of Blankety Blank on BBC1.
- 10 September – BBC1 begins showing the American fantasy adventure cartoon series Dungeons & Dragons.
- 11 September – After making its debut in Australia, British-made animation Towser finally makes its debut on ITV.
- 18 September – The network television premiere of Mel Brooks' 1974 horror comedy film Young Frankenstein on BBC2, starring Gene Wilder and Marty Feldman.
- 23 September – Barry Hines's acclaimed Threads airs on BBC2. Produced by the BBC and Nine Network Australia, the one-off TV drama depicting the impact of a nuclear war in Britain will go on to win four BAFTA awards, including Best Single Drama.

=== October ===
- 4 October – The BBC Radio 4 consumer show Checkpoint begins a 4-episode TV mini-series hosted by Roger Cook
- 5 October
  - The first programme in the trilogy to be produced by Maddocks Cartoon Productions, The Family-Ness, makes its debut on BBC1.
  - BBC2 broadcasts an Open University programme at teatime for the final time.
- 6 October – TV Times Magazine is rebranded back to its original TV Times name.
- 7 October–December – "Pirate" television station Thameside TV broadcasts illicitly from south London.
- 8 October
  - BBC2 launches a full afternoon service, consisting primarily of repeats of Dallas and old feature films.
  - The Australian soap Prisoner: Cell Block H makes its UK debut when Yorkshire Television becomes the first ITV region to begin airing the programme in a late night slot. It is followed by all other ITV regions over the following five years.
  - Scottish Television relaunches its regional news programme Scotland Today as a features-led magazine format with the news relegated to brief summaries before and after the programme.
  - Pirate television station Channel 36 'Late Night London Television', run by Waveview Holdings, begins broadcasting illicitly.
- 9 October – The children's series based on the books by the Rev. Wilbert Awdry and narrated by Ringo Starr, Thomas the Tank Engine & Friends makes its debut on ITV, becoming one of the most successful children's TV programmes of all time since Postman Pat first went to air on the BBC three years earlier. The show will move to one future station, Cartoon Network, in the mid-1990s, before returning to terrestrial television in 2003 and moving to its new permanent future station Channel 5 three years later.
- 12 October
  - Brighton hotel bombing: Breakfast television broadcasts live coverage of severely injured Cabinet minister Norman Tebbit being stretchered from the hotel's ruins; however, TV-am has insufficient news resources to cover the event adequately, incurring a rebuke from the IBA.
  - American helicopter action series Airwolf makes its UK debut on ITV, starring Jan-Michael Vincent and Ernest Borgnine.
- 13 October – ITV broadcasts darts' first televised nine dart finish, made by John Lowe.
- 15 October – Channel 4's output increases by 25%. The weekday schedules now begin at 2:30pm instead of 5pm while weekend airtime starts at 1pm rather than 2pm.
- 16 October – Police drama The Bill airs for the first time on ITV. It debuted last year as a pilot show, Woodentop. When the last episode is shown in 2010, it will be the longest-running police procedural in British television history.
- 17 October – Another strike begins at Thames over the same issue which unions went on strike six weeks earlier.
- 19 October
  - A management-operated schedule is introduced on Thames. It broadcasts programming between around 1:30pm and around midnight as well as the ITV breakfast service TV-am. For the intervening four hours, instead of schools programmes, Thames viewers are left with a blue screen showing their upcoming emergency schedule and, with no access to ITN News, Thames viewers have to make do with short news bulletins. Weekend ITV schedules for the London region are not affected by the strike, with London Weekend Television coming on air on Fridays at 5:15pm as usual.
  - Yorkshire Television airs a special documentary on the birth of Prince Harry.
- 23 October – BBC News presenter Michael Buerk gives a powerful commentary of the famine in Ethiopia which has already claimed thousands of lives and reportedly has the potential to kill as many as seven million people. The news report subsequently leads to the formation of the charity supergroup Band Aid and the No.1 single "Do They Know It's Christmas?" as well as the Live Aid concerts the following year.

=== November ===
- 3 November
  - Following the assassination of Indian Prime Minister Indira Gandhi on 31 October, coverage of her funeral is televised by ITV, dropping children's programmes Cartoon Time and Fraggle Rock. The coverage is suspended for an hour to show a shortened The Saturday Starship, with the last thirty minutes of Gandhi's funeral removing the last twenty minutes of the children's programme.
  - The strike at Thames Television finally ends, after 62 film editors agree to the new conditions while the ACTT agrees as well to start negotiations about the introductions of new technology. Additional episodes of network productions are screened to help clear the backlog.
- 7 November – BBC1 starts airing season 8 of the American drama series Dallas.
- 12 November – Channel 4 begins airing RTE's The Late Late Show hosted by Gay Byrne in an afternoon slot with edited highlights from the two hour edition shown in Ireland into one hour. The series would continue to run in that format until C4 cancelled the series in 1996.
- 21 November – Debut of Alan Seymour's dramatisation of the 1935 John Masefield children's fantasy adventure novel The Box of Delights on BBC1, starring Patrick Troughton and Robert Stephens. The six-part series concludes on Christmas Eve.

=== December ===
- 1 December – The Cable Authority comes into existence and on 1 January 1985 it takes over the functions granted to it by the Cable and Broadcasting Act 1984, paving the way for fully commercial cable franchises to be awarded on a city-by-city basis.
- 10 December – Channel 4 airs An Evening with Mary Tyler Moore, along with episodes of St. Elsewhere and The Betty White Show.
- 18 December – Bruce Lee's 1973 martial arts action film Enter the Dragon is shown on ITV in its full uncut version; however all subsequent airings would be censored.
- 21 December – Children's programme Crackerjack ends after 29 series and nearly 3 decades.
- 24 December – BBC1 shows the 1975 Walt Disney family film One of Our Dinosaurs Is Missing, starring Peter Ustinov.
- 25 December
  - Christmas Day on BBC1 features the debut of Noel Edmonds regular Christmas show The Live Live Christmas Breakfast Show broadcast from Telecom Tower and the network television premiere of the 1964 Walt Disney musical film Mary Poppins, starring Julie Andrews.
  - ITV shows the network television premiere of Steven Spielberg's 1981 action adventure blockbuster film Raiders of the Lost Ark, starring Harrison Ford as Indiana Jones.
- 26 December
  - Joan Hickson makes her debut as Agatha Christie's Miss Marple in BBC1's eponymous series with the first part of a three-part adaptation of The Body in the Library. Part two airs on 27 December and part three on 28 December.
  - The network television premiere of the 1980 American comedy spoof disaster film Airplane! on ITV, starring Robert Hays, Julie Hagerty, Leslie Nielsen, Lloyd Bridges and Robert Stack.
  - BBC1 shows the network premiere of the 1981 World War II set football film Escape to Victory, starring Michael Caine and Sylvester Stallone.
- 27 December – BBC2 airs the final episode of the US sitcom M*A*S*H.
- 28 December – ITV shows the documentary From Star Wars to Jedi: The Making of a Saga, narrated by Mark Hamill, as well as airing the original 1977 Star Wars film for a third time on 30 December.
- 30 December – The network television premiere of Kramer vs. Kramer, the 1979 Oscar-winning legal drama film, on BBC1, starring Dustin Hoffman and Meryl Streep.

=== Also ===
- Telstar TV, the UK's first pirate television station, continues to broadcast in Birmingham at various points throughout 1984. The channel broadcasts on the BBC2 transmitter in the Northfield and Rubery areas of the city, showing a mixture of films and music videos at the weekend after BBC2 closes down for the night. The channel lasted for just over a year and ended its broadcasts early in 1985.

== Debuts ==
=== BBC1 ===
- 2 January – Amy (1984)
- 4 January – Cockles (1984)
- 8 January – The Thorn Birds (1983)
- 10 January – The District Nurse (1984–1987)
- 11 January – Strangers and Brothers (1984)
- 12 January – Diana (1984)
- 19 January – The Living Planet (1984)
- 27 January – Sharon and Elsie (1984–1985)
- 29 January
  - Ever Decreasing Circles (1984–1989)
  - Goodbye Mr. Chips (1984)
  - One by One (1984–1987)
- 11 February –The Odd Job Man (1984)
- 15 February – The Farm (1984)
- 22 February – Moonfleet (1984)
- 3 March – Driving Ambition (1984)
- 29 March – Missing from Home (1984)
- 7 April – The Laughter Show (1984–1991)
- 12 May – Automan (1983–1984)
- 4 June – Manimal (1983)
- 7 June – Crimewatch (1984–2017)
- 25 June – Round and Round (1984)
- 9 July – The Kids of Degrassi Street (1979–1986)
- 1 September – Bob's Full House (1984–1990)
- 3 September
  - North West Tonight (1984–present)
  - Inside Ulster (1984–1996)
  - BBC London Plus (1984–1989)
  - Six O'Clock News (1984–present)
- 4 September
  - The Invisible Man (1984)
  - The Lenny Henry Show (1984–1988)
- 6 September – The Magnificent Evans (1984)
- 10 September – Dungeons & Dragons (1983–1985)
- 12 September – Cold Warrior (1984)
- 14 September – Hartbeat (1984–1993)
- 15 September – The Tripods (1984–1985)
- 24 September – Beat the Teacher (1984–1988)
- 4 October – Checkpoint (1984)
- 5 October – The Family-Ness (1984–1985)
- 14 October – Big Deal (1984–1986)
- 18 November – The Prisoner of Zenda (1984)
- 21 November – The Box of Delights (1984)
- 6 December
  - The Front Line (1984–1985)
  - The Secret Servant (1984)
- 10 December –Hilary (1984–1986)
- 21 December – City Lights (1984–1991)
- 24 December – The ChuckleHounds (1984–1986)
- 26 December – Miss Marple (1984–1992)

=== BBC2 ===
- 5 January – The Hello Goodbye Man (1984)
- 13 January – A Family Man (1984)
- 31 January – Alas Smith and Jones (1984–1998)
- 12 February – The Weather in the Streets (1984)
- 14 March – Swallows and Amazons Forever! (1984)
- 16 March – The Treatment (1984)
- 19 March – The Fainthearted Feminist (1984)
- 31 March – 4 American Composers (1984)
- 6 May – Sharing Time (1984)
- 26 May – Journey into the Shadows (1984)
- 20 June – Leaving (1984–1985)
- 11 July – A Winter Harvest (1984)
- 10 September – Bootle Saddles (1984)
- 12 September – Sea of Faith (1984)
- 14 September – Freud (1984)
- 18 September – Look and Read: Badger Girl (1984)
- 23 September – Threads (1984)
- 28 September – A Taste of Honey (1984)
- 1 October – Doctor Fischer of Geneva (1984)
- 22 October – Lame Ducks (1984–1986)
- 29 October
  - Laugh??? I Nearly Paid My Licence Fee (1984)
  - Ken Hom's Chinese Cookery (1984–1987)
- 14 November – Oxbridge Blues (1984)
- 27 November – The Clairvoyant (1984–1986)
- 3 December –The New Statesman (1984–1985)
- 17 December – Comrade Dad (1984–1986)
- 18 December – Open to Question
- Unknown – A Woman Calling (1984)

=== ITV ===
- 7 January
  - Fraggle Rock (1984–1990)
  - Child's Play (1984–1988)
- 8 January – Love and Marriage (1984–1986)
- 9 January
  - The Jewel in the Crown (1984)
  - Miracles Take Longer (1984)
  - Chocky (1984)
- 19 January – The Steam Video Company (1984)
- 13 February – Duty Free (1984–1986)
- 17 February – Killer (1984)
- 22 February – The Country Diary of an Edwardian Lady (1984)
- 26 February – Spitting Image (1984–1996)
- 7 March – Fresh Fields (1984–1986)
- 9 March – Shroud for a Nightingale (1984)
- 10 March – Whiz Kids (1983–1984)
- 24 March – The Price Is Right (1984–1988 ITV, 1989–1990 Sky1, 1995–2001, 2006–2007 ITV, 2017 Channel 4)
- 26 March – Charlie (1984)
- 28 March – Letty (1984)
- 29 March – Benny (1984)
- 2 April – The Kit Curran Radio Show (1984–1986)
- 10 April – How Dare You (1984–1987)
- 16 April – The Master of Ballantrae (1984)
- 18 April – Mr. Palfrey of Westminster (1984–1985)
- 24 April – The Adventures of Sherlock Holmes (1984–1988, 1991–1994)
- 28 April – Robin of Sherwood (1984–1986)
- 5 May – Galactica 1980 (1980)
- 6 May – Surprise Surprise (1984–2001, 2012–2015)
- 31 May – Scarecrow and Mrs. King (1983–1985)
- 6 June – Sorrell and Son (1984)
- 9 June – Aspel and Company (1984–1993)
- 15 June – Pull the Other One (1984)
- 26 June – The Brief (1984)
- 8 July – Weekend Playhouse (1984)
- 12 July – Poor Little Rich Girls (1984)
- 13 July – Emu's All Live Pink Windmill Show (1984–1989)
- 17 July – The Lonelyhearts Kid (1984)
- 26 July – Starstrider (1984–1985)
- 27 July –I Thought You'd Gone (1984)
- 30 July – V (1983–1985, 2009–2011)
- 10 August – Annika (1984)
- 31 August
  - Me and My Girl (1984–1988)
  - Mitch (1984)
  - Inspector Gadget (1983–1986)
- 1 September
  - Bottle Boys (1984–1985)
  - The Saturday Starship (1984–1985)
- 2 September – Lace (1984)
- 5 September – Hammer House of Mystery and Suspense (1984)
- 11 September – Towser (1984)
- 24 September – Tripper's Day (1984)
- 1 October – The Glory Boys (1984)
- 8 October – Prisoner Cell Block H Yorkshire region only (1979–1987)
- 9 October – Thomas the Tank Engine and Friends (ITV and Cartoon Network 1984–2006, Five 2006–present)
- 12 October – Airwolf (1984–1987)
- 13 October – Wide Awake Club (1984–1989)
- 16 October – The Bill (1984–2010)
- 17 October – Rub-a-Dub-Dub (1984)
- 5 November – Tickle on the Tum (1984–1988)
- 7 November
  - Chish 'n' Fips (1984–1987)
  - Travelling Man (1984–1985)
- 8 November – Stanley Bagshaw (1984)
- 9 November – Eh Brian! It's a Whopper (1984)
- 9 December – The Ebony Tower (1984)
- 21 November – Wil Cwac Cwac (1984–1986)
- 26 December – Kim (1984)
- Unknown
  - We Love TV (1984–1986)
  - Masquerade (1983–1984)

=== Channel 4 ===
- 3 January
  - The Far Pavilions (1984)
  - Katri, Girl of the Meadows (1984)
- 6 January – Dream Stuffing (1984)
- 14 February – Tom Keating on Impressionism (1984)
- 22 March – Channel 4 Racing (1984–2016)
- 5 April – Caught in a Free State (1984)
- 3 May – Edwin (1984)
- 14 May – Scully (1984)
- 24 May – American Caesar (1984) (documentary)
- 14 July – They Came from Somewhere Else (1984)
- 10 September – Chance in a Million (1984–1986)
- 27 September – The House (1984)
- 22 October – Fairly Secret Army (1984–1986)
- 5 December – Puccini (1984)

== Channels ==
=== New channels ===
Date	Channel
29 March	Music Box
29 March	Screensport
29 March	The Entertainment Network
1 September	The Children's Channel
1 September	Premiere

=== Rebranded channels ===
Date	Old Name	New Name
16 January	Satellite Television	Sky Channel

=== Defunct channels ===
Date	Old Name	New Name
29 March	Starview	

== Television shows ==
=== Returning this year after a break of one year or longer ===
- 26 March – What's My Line? (1951–1964, 1984–1996)
- 9 September Thunderbirds (1972–1980, 1984–1987)

== Continuing television shows ==
=== 1920s ===
- BBC Wimbledon (1927–1939, 1946–2019, 2021–present)

=== 1930s ===
- Trooping the Colour (1937–1939, 1946–2019, 2023–present)
- The Boat Race (1938–1939, 1946–2019, 2021–present)
- BBC Cricket (1939, 1946–1999, 2020–2024)

=== 1940s ===
- Come Dancing (1949–1998)

=== 1950s ===
- What's My Line? (1951–1964, 1984–1996)
- Panorama (1953–present)
- What the Papers Say (1956–2008)
- The Sky at Night (1957–present)
- Blue Peter (1958–present)
- Grandstand (1958–2007)

=== 1960s ===
- Coronation Street (1960–present)
- Songs of Praise (1961–present)
- Doctor Who (1963–1989, 1996, 2005–present)
- World in Action (1963–1998)
- Top of the Pops (1964–2006)
- Match of the Day (1964–present)
- Crossroads (1964–1988, 2001–2003)
- Play School (1964–1988)
- Mr. and Mrs. (1965–1999)
- World of Sport (1965–1985)
- Jackanory (1965–1996, 2006)
- Sportsnight (1965–1997)
- Call My Bluff (1965–2005)
- The Money Programme (1966–2010)
- Reksio (1967–1990)
- The Big Match (1968–2002)

=== 1970s ===
- The Old Grey Whistle Test (1971–1987)
- The Two Ronnies (1971–1987, 1991, 1996, 2005)
- Pebble Mill at One (1972–1986, 1991–1996)
- Rainbow (1972–1992, 1994–1997)
- Emmerdale (1972–present)
- Newsround (1972–present)
- Weekend World (1972–1988)
- We Are the Champions (1973–1987)
- Last of the Summer Wine (1973–2010)
- That's Life! (1973–1994)
- Wish You Were Here...? (1974–2003)
- Arena (1975–present)
- Jim'll Fix It (1975–1994)
- Gambit (1975–1985, 1995)
- One Man and His Dog (1976–present)
- 3-2-1 (1978–1988)
- Grange Hill (1978–2008)
- Ski Sunday (1978–present)
- Terry and June (1979–1987)
- The Book Tower (1979–1989)
- Blankety Blank (1979–1990, 1997–2002)
- The Paul Daniels Magic Show (1979–1994)
- Antiques Roadshow (1979–present)
- Question Time (1979–present)

=== 1980s ===
- Play Your Cards Right (1980–1987, 1994–1999, 2002–2003)
- Family Fortunes (1980–2002, 2006–2015, 2020–2023)
- Juliet Bravo (1980–1985)
- Cockleshell Bay (1980–1986)
- Children in Need (1980–present)
- Finders Keepers (1981–1985)
- Freetime (1981–1985)
- Game for a Laugh (1981–1985)
- Tenko (1981–1985)
- That's My Boy (1981–1986)
- Razzamatazz (1981–1987)
- Bergerac (1981–1991)
- Odd One Out (1982–1985)
- On Safari (1982–1985)
- 'Allo 'Allo! (1982–1992)
- Wogan (1982–1992)
- Saturday Superstore (1982–1987)
- The Tube (1982–1987)
- Brookside (1982–2003)
- Countdown (1982–present)
- Let's Pretend (TV series) (1982–1988)
- No. 73 (1982–1988)
- Timewatch (1982–2021)
- Right to Reply (1982–2001)
- Up the Elephant and Round the Castle (1983–1985)
- Inspector Gadget (1983–1986)
- Bananaman (1983–1986)
- Just Good Friends (1983–1986)
- Philip Marlowe, Private Eye (1983–1986)
- Breadwinners (1983–1986)
- Breakfast Time (1983–1989)
- Dramarama (1983–1989)
- Don't Wait Up (1983–1990)
- Good Morning Britain (1983–1992)
- First Tuesday (1983–1993)
- Highway (1983–1993)
- Blockbusters (1983–93, 1994–95, 1997, 2000–01, 2012, 2019)

== Ending this year ==
- 12 January – Shelley (1979–1984, 1988–1992)
- 14 January – Agatha Christie's Partners in Crime (1983–1984)
- 17 February – A Fine Romance (1981–1984)
- 29 March – Crown Court (1972–1984)
- 2 April – Alphabet Zoo (1983–1984)
- 3 April – The Jewel in the Crown (1984)
- 14 April – The Saturday Show (1982–1984)
- 11 June – Rentaghost (1976–1984)
- 19 June – The Young Ones (1982–1984)
- 27 July – Sixty Minutes (1983–1984)
- 12 August – Now and Then (1983–1984)
- 16 October – Towser (1984)
- 2 November – Mitch (1984)
- 20 November – Rub-a-Dub-Dub (1984)
- 24 November – The Gentle Touch (1980–1984)
- 11 December – On Safari (1982–1984)
- 20 December – Screen Test (1969–1984)
- 21 December – Crackerjack! (1955–1984, 2020–2021)
- 22 December – Punchlines (1981–1984)
- 30 December – Thunderbirds Weekends (1981–1983)
- 31 December – Katri, Girl of the Meadows (1984)
- 31 December – Give Us a Break (1983–1984)

== Births ==
- 6 February – Gemma Merna, actress
- 29 February – Rakhee Thakrar, actress
- 7 March – Rachel Rice, actress and reality show contestant
- 28 March – Nikki Sanderson, actress
- 22 April – Michelle Ryan, actress
- 15 May – Alex Brooker, presenter
- 19 August – Simon Bird, actor
- 5 September – Annabelle Wallis, actress
- 27 October – Kelly Osbourne, singer
- 16 November – Gemma Atkinson, actress and model
- 25 December – Georgia Tennant, actress

== Deaths ==
Date	Name	Age	Cinematic Credibility
4 January	Jameson Clark	76	actor
11 February	John Comer	59	actor (Sid in Last of the Summer Wine)
1 March	Roland Culver	83	actor
4 March	Geoffrey Lumsden	69	actor (Captain Square in Dad's Army)
12 March	Arnold Ridley	88	actor (Private Charles Godfrey in Dad's Army)
17 March	John Dearth	63	actor (The Adventures of Robin Hood)
27 March	Derek Francis	60	actor
31 March	Jack Howarth	88	actor (Albert Tatlock in Coronation Street)
1 April	William Kendall	80	actor
15 April	Tommy Cooper	63	comedian and magician
26 April	Barry Gray	75	theme tune composer
2 May	Frank Forsyth	78	actor
4 May	Diana Dors	52	actress (Queenie's Castle, Just William, The Two Ronnies)
15 May	Mary Adams	86	television producer and director
27 May	Reginald Bosanquet	51	journalist and newsreader, presented News at Ten during the 1970s
28 May	Eric Morecambe	58	comedian (Morecambe and Wise)
30 May	Michael Elliott	52	television director
6 June	Edith Sharpe	89	actress
24 June	Tommy Godfrey	68	actor
11 July	Hugh Morton	81	actor
18 July	Lally Bowers	70	actress
23 July	Anthony Sharp	69	actor
12 August	Christine Hargreaves	45	actress (Christine Appleby in Coronation Street)
27 August	Bernard Youens	69	actor (Stan Ogden in Coronation Street)
6 September	Donny MacLeod	52	television presenter (Pebble Mill at One)
27 September	Toke Townley	71	actor (Sam Pearson in Emmerdale)
5 October	Leonard Rossiter	57	actor (Rising Damp, The Fall and Rise of Reginald Perrin)
10 October	Alan Lake	43	actor
26 October	Noel Howlett	81	actor (Please Sir!)
6 November	Seymour de Lotbiniere	79	pioneer of outside broadcasts
20 November	Peter Welch	62	actor (Dixon of Dock Green, Spy Trap, Emmerdale)
23 November	Margaret Burton	60	actress (The Tomorrow People)
15 December	Lennard Pearce	69	actor (Grandad in Only Fools and Horses)
22 December	Sidney Vivian	83	actor (Hadleigh)
24 December	Ian Hendry	53	actor

== See also ==
- 1984 in British music
- 1984 in British radio
- 1984 in the United Kingdom
- List of British films of 1984
