= List of British films of 1984 =

A list of films produced in the United Kingdom in 1984 (see 1984 in film):

== 1984 ==
Title	Director	Cast	Genre	Notes
1984
1984	Michael Radford	John Hurt, Richard Burton, Suzanna Hamilton	Drama	
Another Country	Marek Kanievska	Rupert Everett, Colin Firth	Drama	Entered into the 1984 Cannes Film Festival
Beat This: A Hip-Hop History	Dick Fontaine		Documentary	
The Bostonians	James Ivory	Christopher Reeve, Vanessa Redgrave	Drama/romance	
The Bounty	Roger Donaldson	Mel Gibson, Anthony Hopkins, Laurence Olivier	Historical drama	
Cal	Pat O'Connor	John Lynch, Helen Mirren	Drama	
The Chain	Jack Gold	Herbert Norville, Denis Lawson	Comedy	
Chinese Boxes	Chris Petit	Will Patton, Robbie Coltrane	Thriller	
Comfort and Joy	Bill Forsyth	Bill Paterson, Clare Grogan	Comedy	
The Company of Wolves	Neil Jordan	Sarah Patterson, Angela Lansbury	Horror	
Don't Open Till Christmas	Edmund Purdom	Edmund Purdom, Alan Lake	Thriller/horror	
Every Picture Tells a Story	James Scott	Phyllis Logan, Alex Norton, Natasha Richardson	Drama	
The Evil That Men Do	J. Lee Thompson	Charles Bronson, Theresa Saldana	Action	Co-production with Mexico and the United States
Forbidden	Anthony Page	Jacqueline Bisset, Jürgen Prochnow	Drama	Co-production with the US and West Germany
Give My Regards to Broad Street	Peter Webb	Paul McCartney, Bryan Brown	Musical	
Greystoke: The Legend of Tarzan, Lord of the Apes	Hugh Hudson	Christopher Lambert, Andie MacDowell	Adventure	
The Hit	Stephen Frears	John Hurt, Terence Stamp, Tim Roth	Crime/drama	
The Hotel New Hampshire	Tony Richardson	Rob Lowe, Jodie Foster	Comedy/drama	Co-production with the Canada and US
The Killing Fields	Roland Joffé	Sam Waterston, Haing S. Ngor	Historical drama	No. 100 on the list of BFI Top 100 British films
Memed My Hawk	Peter Ustinov	Peter Ustinov, Herbert Lom	Drama	
Ordeal by Innocence	Desmond Davis	Donald Sutherland, Sarah Miles, Christopher Plummer, Faye Dunaway	Mystery	
A Passage to India	David Lean	Art Malik, Judy Davis, Peggy Ashcroft	Drama	Based on the novel by E. M. Forster
A Private Function	Malcolm Mowbray	Michael Palin, Maggie Smith	Comedy	
Reflections	Kevin Billington	Gabriel Byrne, Donal McCann	Drama	
Return to Waterloo	Ray Davies	Kenneth Colley, Tim Roth	Musical drama	
Scandalous	Rob Cohen	Robert Hays, Ron Travis, John Gielgud	Comedy	
Secret Places	Zelda Barron	Marie-Theres Relin, Tara MacGowran	Drama	
Sheena	John Guillermin	Tanya Roberts, Ted Wass	Fantasy/adventure	
Space Riders	Joe Massot	Barry Sheene, Gavan O'Herlihy, Sayo Inaba	Sport/biography	
Success Is the Best Revenge	Jerzy Skolimowski			Entered into the 1984 Cannes Film Festival
Sword of the Valiant	Stephen Weeks	Miles O'Keeffe, Cyrielle Clair	Action	
The Terminator	James Cameron	Arnold Schwarzenegger, Michael Biehn, Linda Hamilton, Paul Winfield	Science fiction action	
What Waits Below	Don Sharp	Robert Powell, Lisa Blount	Sci-fi	
White Elephant	Werner Grusch	Peter Firth, Peter Sarpong	Comedy	

== See also ==
- 1984 in British music
- 1984 in British radio
- 1984 in British television
- 1984 in the United Kingdom
