= Pat Silver-Lasky =

American screenwriter

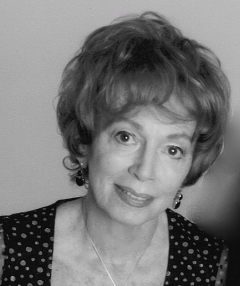
- Born: Barbara Hayden; 1925
- Died: 2025 (aged 99–100)
- Occupations: Actress; writer
- Spouses: Tony Romano (m. 1946, divorced) Jesse L. Lasky Jr. (m. 1959; died 1988) Peter Betts (m. 1997)
- Children: 2, including Richard Niles

Barbara Hayden (1925–2025), also known professionally as Pat Silver-Lasky, was an American actress and writer, mostly known for her collaborations with her second husband, Jesse L. Lasky Jr.

== Collaborations with Lasky Jr. ==
Silver-Lasky wrote four books with her second husband, Jesse, including historical novel The Offer, eight films, nearly 100 TV scripts, including the "Explorers" series ("Ten Who Dared" in the United States). Their verse play Ghost Town won several awards in the U.S. In 1984 and 1986, their TV series Philip Marlowe, Private Eye won three awards in the US and the Netherlands.

In 1987, Pat and Jesse wrote the play Vivien based on their book Love Scene, the story of Laurence Olivier and Vivien Leigh. Silver-Lasky directed its first production at the Melrose Theatre in Los Angeles (1987) and directed the London-rehearsed reading of Viven in 1992.

== Solo work ==
Silver-Lasky produced, wrote, directed, and acted in the first live TV drama series from Hollywood, Mabel's Fables, for KTLA (Paramount Pictures), which received an Emmy nomination. She also appeared in feature roles in films, played leading and co-starring roles on television, and directed for the theater in Los Angeles and Palm Springs.

As an ASCAP writer, she wrote lyrics for 14 published and recorded songs, including "While You're Young" for Johnny Mathis's album Portrait of Johnny. She wrote the lyrics for two films at Columbia Studios.

She served as a story editor on the second Marlowe series. She wrote articles and interviews, contributed to various British antique journals and written short stories for international magazines, including a 1999 series of romantic short stories for A World of Romance.

She lectured on script writing at several American universities, and was script consultant and guest lecturer at the London International Film School for eight years until 1999.

== Credits ==
=== As an actress ===
- "The Crimson Kimono" (1959) — Mother
- "Have Gun – Will Travel" episode "The Man Who Lost" (1959) — Mrs. Bryson
- "Rescue 8" episode "Find That Bomb!" (1958) — Kit Shocky
- "A Perilous Journey" (1953) — Cathy
- "The Loves of Carmen" (1948) (uncredited) — Woman on Stagecoach

=== Books ===
- Ride the Tiger
- A Star Called Wormwood
- The Offer
- Screenwriting for the 21st Century
- Men of Mystery
- Dark Dimensions
- Love Scene
- The Offer

=== Theater productions ===
- Ghost Town
- Gehenna of the Bone (London)
- Vivien

=== Feature films ===
- The Wizard of Baghdad (1960)
- 7 Women from Hell (1961)
- Pirates of Tortuga (1961)
- Land Raiders (1970)
- Ace Up My Sleeve (1976)
- The Bulldance (1989)

=== Television series ===
- Mabel's Fables
- Shannon
- Paladin
- The New Breed
- The Saint
- The Baron
- Danger Man
- The Avengers
- The Protectors
- BBC Musical Specials
- Space: 1999
- The Swinging Scene
- Ben Hall
- The World of Lowell Thomas
- The Explorers
- Philip Marlowe, Private Eye
- Love at First Sight

== Personal life ==
In 1946, Silver-Lasky married Tony Romano, with whom she has a son, Richard Niles, and a daughter.

In 1959, she married screenwriter and author Jesse L. Lasky Jr., who died in 1988.

In 1995, Silver-Lasky met British cartoonist Peter Betts. They married in 1997.
