= 1984 in British music =

This is a summary of 1984 in music in the United Kingdom, including the official charts from that year.

== Summary ==
1984 was a year of several huge selling releases, including at the time the biggest selling single ever. Six singles this year sold over a million copies, the joint highest number ever along with 1998. Out of the top 10 biggest selling songs of the 1980s, six of them all peaked in 1984 including the entire top 4.

One of the biggest bands of the year was Frankie Goes to Hollywood, a five-piece from Liverpool fronted by Holly Johnson. Their debut single "Relax" was banned by the BBC for sexually suggestive content, and was number 1 for five weeks. Their second single "Two Tribes" referenced the ongoing cold war and featured a music video of lookalikes of American president Ronald Reagan and Soviet leader Konstantin Chernenko violently fighting, and was number 1 for nine weeks in the summer, both songs selling over a million. In November they made chart history when their third single, "The Power of Love", also made number 1. They were only the second band in chart history to have their first three releases all go to number 1, following Gerry & The Pacemakers twenty years earlier; however, it would be their last. Their album "Welcome to the Pleasuredome" also reached number 1.

Wham! had their first number 1 single this year after four earlier top 10 hits, the upbeat "Wake Me Up Before You Go-Go". This would soon be followed by their second, "Freedom" later in the year, and their second album Make It Big also reached the top. One of the members of the band, George Michael, also released a solo single this year, the ballad "Careless Whisper" co-written by his bandmate Andrew Ridgeley. It was number 1 for three weeks and sold over a million.

A big-selling singer who would go on to have many hits over the next two decades first appeared this year, American singer Madonna. Her debut hit "Holiday" reached number 6, and "Like a Virgin" charted three places higher at number 3. From the same country came Prince, who had his first two top 10 hits with "When Doves Cry" and "Purple Rain". For both artists, 1985 would bring even more hits as would the rest of the decade.

After eighteen years, Stevie Wonder achieved his first solo number 1 single with "I Just Called to Say I Love You", from the soundtrack of the film The Woman in Red, selling over a million. He had first charted at the age of 15 with "Uptight (Everything's Alright)" in 1966, and had previously had a number 1 in 1982 with a duet with Paul McCartney, "Ebony and Ivory". In 1984 his harmonica playing featured in Chaka Khan's number one hit "I Feel for You" and in 1985 Eurythmics' number 1 hit "There Must Be an Angel (Playing with My Heart)".

The Christmas number one single featured more than 40 artists. "Do They Know It's Christmas?", written by Bob Geldof and Midge Ure, was made in response to ongoing famine in Ethiopia, so the supergroup Band Aid was formed to sing a charity record about it, all proceeds from the song going to the charity to raise money for help. Popular acts of the day such as Wham!, U2, Spandau Ballet, Duran Duran and Boy George sung on the record.

Not only did the song become the Christmas number one, it sold over three million copies and became the biggest selling single of all time, a record that held for the next thirteen years. The song at number 2, Wham!'s Last Christmas, sold over a million and proceeds from that also went to the charity. Further Band Aid singles would be released in 1989 (Band Aid II) and 2004 (Band Aid 20), both also Christmas number one.

The classical year was kicked off by the first complete performances of Oliver Knussen's one act fantasy opera Where the Wild Things Are, based on Maurice Sendak's 1963 children's book of the same title. Knussen composed the music from 1979 to 1983 and an earlier version was first heard in Brussels in 1980. The other major classical music event of the year was the first performances (in the US, then in the UK) of The Mask of Time, the longest and most ambitious of Michael Tippett's late works, written in 1982 by the then 77 year-old composer. Wilfrid Mellers called it "a mind-boggling cosmic history of the universe", while Paul Driver wrote that the Mask revealed "the authentic early Tippett", with a return to the lyricism of The Midsummer Marriage and multiple acknowledgements of his early compositions.

== Events ==
- 9 January – first complete performance of Oliver Knussen's Where the Wild Things Are by Glyndebourne Touring Opera at the National Theatre, London.
- 11 January – BBC Radio 1 DJ Mike Read announces on air that he will not play the single "Relax" by Frankie Goes to Hollywood because of its suggestive lyrics. The BBC places a total ban on the record at about the same time.
- 21 January – "Relax" reaches number one in the UK singles chart, despite the BBC ban; it will spend a total of 42 weeks in the Top 40.
- 14 February – Elton John marries studio engineer Renate Blauel.
- 1 March – Sting plays his last concerts with the Police at the end of the Synchronicity tour; the band takes a "pause" after the tour and only play a few special events together after this until 2007, when they organise a reunion tour.
- 5 April – Michael Tippet's large scale choral work The Mask of Time for vocal soloists, chorus and orchestra is performed for the first time at the Symphony Hall, Boston. The work was commissioned to celebrate the one hundredth anniversary of the Boston Symphony Orchestra.
- 1 May – Mick Fleetwood files for bankruptcy in the United States.
- 19 July – The first performance of Peter Racine Fricker's String Quartet No 3, op 73, written between 1974 and 1976, takes place at the Cheltenham Festival, performed by the Chilingirian Quartet.
- 23 July – The Piano Concerto by Peter Dickinson (dedicated to the soloist Howard Shelley) has its first performance at the Cheltenham Festival with the Philharmonia Orchestra conducted by Edward Downes.
- 23 July – The first UK performance of Michael Tippett's The Mask of Time takes place at the Proms.
- 5 August – Now 3 becomes the 300th album to reach number one on the UK Albums Chart.
- 24 August – Oliver Knussen's Second Symphony receives its premiere at the Proms, with the London Sinfonietta conducted by the composer.
- 23 October – A report on the Ethiopian famine by BBC journalist Michael Buerk is broadcast in the UK and receives an unprecedented public response. Among those watching is Bob Geldof, who is inspired to release a charity record to raise money to help with famine relief.
- 25 November – The Band Aid single "Do They Know It's Christmas?" is recorded at SARM Studios in Notting Hill, London, by a gathering of performers that includes Paul Young, Simon Le Bon, Bono, Phil Collins, Paul Weller, Sting, Boy George and Tony Hadley.
- 28 November – The Bring Me Sunshine charity concert at the London Palladium, in memory of Eric Morecambe, includes musical performances by Kenny Ball and His Jazzmen, Des O'Connor, and Ernie Wise.
- 2 December – Frankie Goes to Hollywood become the first act to take their first three singles to the UK number-one position since Gerry & The Pacemakers in 1963, when "The Power of Love" tops the chart.
- 3 December – Bob Geldof and Band Aid release the single "Do They Know It's Christmas?", which becomes the fastest-selling single of all time in the UK.
- 11 December – While on tour, Bucks Fizz's tour bus crashes. All members of the group are injured and member Mike Nolan suffers brain damage after falling into a coma.
- 13 December – George Harrison makes a rare public appearance, joining Deep Purple on stage in Sydney, Australia for their encore rendition of "Lucille".

== Charts ==
=== Number one singles ===
Chart date (week ending)	Song	Artist(s)	Weeks	Sales
7 January	"Only You"	Flying Pickets	1	168,623
14 January	"Pipes of Peace"	Paul McCartney	2	38,590
21 January	"Pipes of Peace"	Paul McCartney	2	83,929
28 January	"Relax"	Frankie Goes to Hollywood	5	90,270
4 February	"Relax"	Frankie Goes to Hollywood	5	158,168
11 February	"Relax"	Frankie Goes to Hollywood	5	137,819
18 February	"Relax"	Frankie Goes to Hollywood	5	114,886
25 February	"Relax"	Frankie Goes to Hollywood	5	93,143
3 March	"99 Red Balloons"	Nena	3	98,566
10 March	"99 Red Balloons"	Nena	3	98,447
17 March	"99 Red Balloons"	Nena	3	67,490
24 March	"Hello"	Lionel Richie	6	86,190
31 March	"Hello"	Lionel Richie	6	152,762
7 April	"Hello"	Lionel Richie	6	140,641
14 April	"Hello"	Lionel Richie	6	77,911
21 April	"Hello"	Lionel Richie	6	63,648
28 April	"Hello"	Lionel Richie	6	57,970
5 May	"The Reflex"	Duran Duran	4	59,262
12 May	"The Reflex"	Duran Duran	4	84,235
19 May	"The Reflex"	Duran Duran	4	68,731
26 May	"The Reflex"	Duran Duran	4	62,458
2 June	"Wake Me Up Before You Go-Go"	Wham!	2	105,706
9 June	"Wake Me Up Before You Go-Go"	Wham!	2	136,017
16 June	"Two Tribes"	Frankie Goes to Hollywood	9	135,762
23 June	"Two Tribes"	Frankie Goes to Hollywood	9	199,852
30 June	"Two Tribes"	Frankie Goes to Hollywood	9	170,119
7 July	"Two Tribes"	Frankie Goes to Hollywood	9	179,945
14 July	"Two Tribes"	Frankie Goes to Hollywood	9	130,424
21 July	"Two Tribes"	Frankie Goes to Hollywood	9	133,943
28 July	"Two Tribes"	Frankie Goes to Hollywood	9	123,012
4 August	"Two Tribes"	Frankie Goes to Hollywood	9	109,633
11 August	"Two Tribes"	Frankie Goes to Hollywood	9	99,365
18 August	"Careless Whisper"	George Michael	3	159,970
25 August	"Careless Whisper"	George Michael	3	199,546
1 September	"Careless Whisper"	George Michael	3	185,266
8 September	"I Just Called to Say I Love You"	Stevie Wonder	6	194,701
15 September	"I Just Called to Say I Love You"	Stevie Wonder	6	214,030
23 September	"I Just Called to Say I Love You"	Stevie Wonder	6	234,175
30 September	"I Just Called to Say I Love You"	Stevie Wonder	6	198,560
6 October	"I Just Called to Say I Love You"	Stevie Wonder	6	148,087
13 October	"I Just Called to Say I Love You"	Stevie Wonder	6	117,283
20 October	"Freedom"	Wham!	3	118,099
27 October	"Freedom"	Wham!	3	141,576
3 November	"Freedom"	Wham!	3	121,499
10 November	"I Feel for You"	Chaka Khan	3	85,425
17 November	"I Feel for You"	Chaka Khan	3	100,419
24 November	"I Feel for You"	Chaka Khan	3	80,070
1 December	"I Should Have Known Better"	Jim Diamond	1	64,787
8 December	"The Power of Love"	Frankie Goes to Hollywood	1	91,443
15 December	"Do They Know It's Christmas?"	Band Aid	3	574,464
22 December	"Do They Know It's Christmas?"	Band Aid	3	769,046
29 December	"Do They Know It's Christmas?"	Band Aid	3	634,814

=== Number one albums ===
Chart date (week ending)	Album	Artist(s)	Weeks
7 January	Now 1	Various Artists	1
14 January	No Parlez	Paul Young	1
21 January	Now 1	Various Artists	1
28 January	Thriller	Michael Jackson	1
4 February	Touch	Eurythmics	2
11 February	Touch	Eurythmics	2
18 February	Sparkle in the Rain	Simple Minds	1
25 February	Into the Gap	Thompson Twins	3
3 March	Into the Gap	Thompson Twins	3
10 March	Into the Gap	Thompson Twins	3
17 March	Human's Lib	Howard Jones	2
24 March	Human's Lib	Howard Jones	2
31 March	Can't Slow Down	Lionel Richie	2
7 April	Can't Slow Down	Lionel Richie	2
14 April	Now 2	Various Artists	5
21 April	Now 2	Various Artists	5
28 April	Now 2	Various Artists	5
5 May	Now 2	Various Artists	5
12 May	Now 2	Various Artists	5
19 May	Legend	Bob Marley and the Wailers	12
26 May	Legend	Bob Marley and the Wailers	12
2 June	Legend	Bob Marley and the Wailers	12
9 June	Legend	Bob Marley and the Wailers	12
16 June	Legend	Bob Marley and the Wailers	12
23 June	Legend	Bob Marley and the Wailers	12
30 June	Legend	Bob Marley and the Wailers	12
7 July	Legend	Bob Marley and the Wailers	12
14 July	Legend	Bob Marley and the Wailers	12
21 July	Legend	Bob Marley and the Wailers	12
28 July	Legend	Bob Marley and the Wailers	12
4 August	Legend	Bob Marley and the Wailers	12
11 August	Now 3	Various Artists	8
18 August	Now 3	Various Artists	8
25 August	Now 3	Various Artists	8
1 September	Now 3	Various Artists	8
8 September	Now 3	Various Artists	8
15 September	Now 3	Various Artists	8
22 September	Now 3	Various Artists	8
29 September	Now 3	Various Artists	8
6 October	Tonight	David Bowie	1
13 October	The Unforgettable Fire	U2	2
20 October	The Unforgettable Fire	U2	2
27 October	Steeltown	Big Country	1
3 November	Give My Regards to Broad Street	Paul McCartney	1
10 November	Welcome to the Pleasuredome	Frankie Goes to Hollywood	1
17 November	Make It Big	Wham!	2
24 November	Make It Big	Wham!	2
1 December	Hits 1	Various Artists	5
8 December	Hits 1	Various Artists	5
15 December	Hits 1	Various Artists	5
22 December	Hits 1	Various Artists	5
29 December	Hits 1	Various Artists	5

== Year-end charts ==
=== Best-selling singles ===
No.	Title	Artist	Peak position
1	"Do They Know It's Christmas?"	Band Aid	1
2	"I Just Called to Say I Love You"	Stevie Wonder	1
3	"Relax"	Frankie Goes to Hollywood	1
4	"Two Tribes"	Frankie Goes to Hollywood	1
5	"Careless Whisper"	George Michael	1
6	"Last Christmas"/"Everything She Wants" (Remix)	Wham!	2
7	"Hello"	Lionel Richie	1
8	"Agadoo"	Black Lace	2
9	"Ghostbusters"	Ray Parker, Jr.	2
10	"Freedom"	Wham!	1
11	"Wake Me Up Before You Go-Go"	Wham!	1
12	"I Feel for You"	Chaka Khan	1
13	"White Lines (Don't Don't Do It)"	Grandmaster Melle Mel	7
14	"We All Stand Together"	Paul McCartney and the Frog Chorus	3
15	"99 Red Balloons"	Nena	1
16	"The Power of Love"	Frankie Goes to Hollywood	1
17	"The Reflex"	Duran Duran	1
18	"Like a Virgin"	Madonna	4 (Note: Reached number 3 in 1985)
19	"Against All Odds (Take a Look at Me Now)"	Phil Collins	2
20	"What's Love Got to Do with It"	Tina Turner	3
21	"I Should Have Known Better"	Jim Diamond	1
22	"No More Lonely Nights"	Paul McCartney	2
23	"I Want to Break Free"	Queen	3
24	"Hole in My Shoe"	Neil	2
25	"Time After Time"	Cyndi Lauper	3
26	"Radio Ga Ga"	Queen	2
27	"Together in Electric Dreams"	Giorgio Moroder with Philip Oakey	3
28	"When Doves Cry"	Prince	4
29	"Doctor! Doctor!"	Thompson Twins	3
30	"Self Control"	Laura Branigan	5
31	"The War Song"	Culture Club	2
32	"Girls Just Want to Have Fun"	Cyndi Lauper	2
33	"The Wild Boys"	Duran Duran	2
34	"I Won't Let the Sun Go Down on Me"	Nik Kershaw	2
35	"Like to Get to Know You Well"	Howard Jones	4
36	"Nellie the Elephant"	Toy Dolls	4
37	"Pride (In the Name of Love)"	U2	3
38	"Automatic"	The Pointer Sisters	2
39	"Joanna"	Kool & the Gang	2
40	"That's Livin' Alright"	Joe Fagin	3
41	"Wouldn't It Be Good"	Nik Kershaw	4
42	"Street Dance"	Break Machine	3
43	"Smalltown Boy"	Bronski Beat	3
44	"Break My Stride"	Matthew Wilder	4
45	"The Riddle"	Nik Kershaw	3
46	"Dr. Beat"	Miami Sound Machine	6
47	"Let's Hear It for the Boy"	Deniece Williams	2
48	"The NeverEnding Story"	Limahl	4
49	"Caribbean Queen (No More Love on the Run)"	Billy Ocean	6
50	"Whatever I Do (Wherever I Go)"	Hazell Dean	4

=== Best-selling albums ===
No.	Title	Artist	Peak position
1	Can't Slow Down	Lionel Richie	1
2	Hits 1	Various Artists	1
3	Legend	Bob Marley and The Wailers	1
4	Make It Big	Wham!	1
5	Now 3	Various Artists	1
6	Thriller	Michael Jackson	1
7	Diamond Life	Sade	2
8	Now 4	Various Artists	2
9	An Innocent Man	Billy Joel	2
10	Welcome to the Pleasuredome	Frankie Goes to Hollywood	1
11	The Collection	Ultravox	2
12	Into the Gap	Thompson Twins	1
13	Now 2	Various Artists	1
14	The Works	Queen	2
15	Alf	Alison Moyet	3 (Note: Reached number 1 in 1985)
16	Human's Lib	Howard Jones	1
17	Eliminator	ZZ Top	3
18	Private Dancer	Tina Turner	2
19	Party Party: 16 Great Party Icebreakers	Black Lace	4
20	Parade	Spandau Ballet	2
21	The Unforgettable Fire	U2	1
22	Human Racing	Nik Kershaw	5
23	Greatest Hits	Shakin' Stevens	8
24	No Parlez	Paul Young	1
25	Alchemy: Dire Straits Live	Dire Straits	3
26	Touch	Eurythmics	1
27	Give My Regards to Broad Street	Paul McCartney	1
28	Under a Blood Red Sky	U2	6 (Note: Reached number 2 in 1983)
29	Now That's What I Call Music	Various Artists	1
30	The Woman in Red	Stevie Wonder	2
31	Arena	Duran Duran	6
32	Yesterday Once More	Carpenters	10
33	Breaking Hearts	Elton John	2
34	Break Out	The Pointer Sisters	9
35	Colour by Numbers	Culture Club	4 (Note: Reached number 1 in 1983)
36	Café Bleu	The Style Council	2
37	Born in the U.S.A.	Bruce Springsteen	2 (Note: Reached number 1 in 1985)
38	The Smiths	The Smiths	2
39	Cinema	Elaine Paige	12
40	The Crossing	Big Country	7 (Note: Reached number 3 in 1983)
41	The Art Garfunkel Album	Art Garfunkel	12
42	The Riddle	Nik Kershaw	8
43	Purple Rain	Prince & the Revolution	9 (Note: Reached number 7 in 1985)
44	Tonight	David Bowie	1
45	Labour of Love	UB40	11 (Note: Reached number 1 in 1983)
46	Sparkle in the Rain	Simple Minds	1
47	Greatest Hits	Queen	21 (Note: Reached number 1 in 1981)
48	Footloose	Original Soundtrack	7
49	12 Gold Bars Volume II (And I)	Status Quo	12
50	The Age of Consent	Bronski Beat	4

== Classical music ==
=== New works ===
- David Bedford – Crotchet=120 for bass clarinet and tape
- Richard Rodney Bennett
  - After Syrinx II, for marimba
  - Five Sonnets of Louise Labé, for soprano and eleven players
  - Lullay Mine Liking, for unaccompanied chorus
  - Nonsense, for chorus and piano duet
- Michael Berkeley
  - Funerals and Fandangoes, for solo violin
  - Horn Concerto
  - Music for Chaucer, for brass quintet
- Peter Maxwell Davies
  - Agnes Dei, for two sopranos, viola and cello
  - Guitar Sonata
  - The Number 11 Bus, music theatre
  - One Star, At Last, carol for chorus
  - Sonatina for violin and cimbalom
  - Symphony No. 3
  - Unbroken Circle, for ensemble
- Peter Dickinson – Piano Concerto
- Michael Finnissy
  - Catana, for ensemble
  - Delal, for trumpet and piano
  - Lyrics and Limericks, for voice and piano (1982-1984)
  - Ngano, for soli, flute, chorus and percussion (1983-4)
- Jonathan Harvey – Come, Holy Ghost
- Alun Hoddinott – String Quartet No. 2, Op. 113
- Robin Holloway
  - Moments of Vision, cycle for speaker and four players
  - On Hope, cantata for soprano, mezzo and string quartet
  - Romanza for oboe and strings
  - Viola Concerto, Op. 56 (1983-4)
- Elizabeth Maconchy – String Quartet No. 13, Quartetto Corto
- Dominic Muldowney – Saxophone Concerto
- John Tavener
  - Chant, for solo guitar
  - Ikon of Light, for chorus and string trio
  - Little Missenden Calm, for oboe, clarinet, bassoon and horn
  - Mini Song Cycle for Gina, for voice and piano
  - Sixteen Haiku of Seferis, for soprano, tenor and ensemble
  - Vigil Service, for a capella choir, four violins and organ
- Hugh Wood – Piano Trio

=== Opera ===
- Oliver Knussen – Higglety Pigglety Pop!

== Musical theatre ==
- Mike Batt – The Hunting of the Snark given its first performance in the Barbican with the composer conducting the London Symphony Orchestra.
- Howard Goodall – The Hired Man

== Musical films ==
- Give My Regards to Broad Street, with Paul McCartney

== Births ==
- 17 January – Calvin Harris, singer-songwriter, record producer, DJ
- 25 February – Lovefoxxx, singer (CSS)
- 7 March – Kevin McDaid, singer (V)
- 27 March – Laura Critchley singer-songwriter
- 7 April – Yonah Higgins, singer (Cleopatra)
- 22 April – Amelle Berrabah, singer (Sugababes)
- 4 May – Victoria Hesketh (Little Boots), singer-songwriter, musician, DJ
- 10 May – Kristyna Myles, singer-songwriter and pianist
- 14 May – Olly Murs, singer-songwriter
- 23 June – Duffy, singer
- 12 July – Gareth Gates, singer
- 23 July – Matthew Murphy, singer and guitarist (The Wombats)
- 16 September – Katie Melua, singer and musician
- 22 September – Ross Jarman, musician (The Cribs)
- 26 September – Keisha Buchanan, singer, (Sugababes)
- 16 October – Shayne Ward, singer
- 27 October – Kelly Osbourne, singer and TV personality
- 25 December – Jessica Origliasso and Lisa Origliasso, singers (The Veronicas)

== Deaths ==
- 1 January – Alexis Korner, blues musician, 55 (lung cancer)
- 10 January – Binnie Hale, actress and singer, 84
- 26 January – Grahame Clifford, singer and actor, 78
- 18 February – Paul Gardiner, bass guitarist, 25 (overdose)
- 3 March – Kathleen Richards, musicologist, pianist and composer, 88
- 9 March – Imogen Holst, conductor and composer, 76
- 6 April – Jimmy Kennedy, Irish-born British songwriter, 81
- 26 April – Barry Gray, composer, 75
- 30 April – Marcus Dods, composer, 66
- 1 May – Muriel Herbert, composer, 87
- 28 May – Eric Morecambe, entertainer, 58
- 8 June – Gordon Jacob, composer, 89
- 21 June – Webster Booth, tenor, 82
- 22 June – Dill Jones, jazz pianist, 60
- 8 July – Reginald Stewart, conductor, 84
- July – Gervase Hughes, composer, 78
- 14 August – Peter Wishart, composer, 63
- 17 August – Mostyn Thomas, operatic baritone, 88
- 3 September – Dora Labbette, operatic soprano, 86
- 16 October – Constance Warren, composer, 79
- 25 October – Stanford Robinson, conductor and composer, 80
- 5 November – Jessie Furze, pianist and composer, 81
- 22 November – Denis Rose, jazz pianist and trumpeter, 62
- 8 December – Razzle, rock drummer (Hanoi Rocks), 24 (road accident)
- 9 December – Ivor Moreton, singer, pianist and composer, 76
- date unknown – Arthur Fear, operatic bass-baritone

== Music awards ==
=== BRIT Awards ===
The 1984 BRIT Awards winners were:

- Best British producer: Steve Levine
- Best classical recording: Kiri Te Kanawa – "Songs of the Auvergne"
- Best international artist: Michael Jackson
- British breakthrough act: Paul Young
- British female solo artist: Annie Lennox
- British group: Culture Club
- British male solo artist: David Bowie
- Best Selling Single: Culture Club – "Karma Chameleon"
- Outstanding contribution: George Martin
- The Sony award for technical excellence: Spandau Ballet

== See also ==
- 1984 in British radio
- 1984 in British television
- 1984 in the United Kingdom
- List of British films of 1984
