= Evadne Baker =

South African actor

- Evadne Baker, 1964
- Born: 19 August 1937; Cape Town, South Africa
- Died: 17 January 1995 (aged 57)
- Citizenship: South Africa
- Occupation: Actress

Evadne Baker (19 August 1937 – 17 January 1995) was an English actress. She was born in Cape Town, to parents of French, Dutch, and German heritage. She trained as a ballerina from the age of six, and moved to England when she was nine to continue her training in London.

She later studied in Paris and Geneva under several prominent instructors, including Margot Fonteyn. She supported herself by working as a model for Vogue magazine.

When she was aged 17, she was rejected by Sadler's Wells Theatre because she was too tall, and she returned to South Africa to study acting and seek work in the theatre. After a year performing with the national theatre, she returned to England to study jazz dancing. In Paris, she auditioned for Matt Matlex and won a role in a Las Vegas show, where she was discovered by a talent agent for 20th Century Fox, who signed her to a movie contract.

== Films ==
Baker appeared in several films, mostly in minor roles, including Seven Women from Hell (1961), Shock Treatment (1964), and The Sound of Music (1965), in which she played the role of Sister Bernice.

Year	Title	Role	Notes
1961	Pirates of Tortuga	Bawd	Uncredited
1961	Seven Women from Hell	Regan	
1961	The Second Time Around	Girl	Uncredited
1963	Take Her, She's Mine	Woman School Board Meeting	Uncredited
1964	Shock Treatment	Intern	
1964	Fate Is the Hunter	Secretary	Uncredited
1965	The Sound of Music	Sister Bernice	(final film role)
