= Seven Women from Hell =

1961 film by Robert D. Webb

- Directed by: Robert D. Webb
- Written by: Jesse Lasky Jr. and Pat Silver-Lasky
- Produced by: Harry Spalding
- Starring: Patricia Owens; Denise Darcel; Cesar Romero; John Kerr; Margia Dean
- Cinematography: Floyd Crosby
- Edited by: Jodie Copelan
- Music by: Paul Dunlap
- Production company: Associated Producers (API)
- Distributed by: 20th Century-Fox
- Release date: October 1961
- Running time: 88 min.
- Country: United States
- Language: English
- Budget: $300,000

Seven Women from Hell is a 1961 war drama directed by Robert D. Webb and starring Patricia Owens, Denise Darcel (in her final film), Margia Dean, Yvonne Craig and Cesar Romero about women prisoners in a Japanese World War II prison camp, interned with other prisoners.

== Plot ==
When the Japanese invade New Guinea in 1942, Grace Ingram, an Australian member of a scientific expedition, is captured and then imprisoned in a women's detention camp. She shares her prison barrack with six other women: Janet Cook, a pregnant American teenager; Ann Van Laer, a tightlipped but sympathetic German widow; Claire Oudry, a French waitress; Mai-Lu Ferguson, a Eurasian nurse; and two other Americans, Mara Shepherd, an ignorant rich woman, and Regan, a soft-spoken young lady.

During a bombing raid, Janet's baby is born dead and the humane Captain Oda is killed. Sergeant Takahashi, his sadistic assistant, assumes command of the camp, and a friendly Japanese, Doctor Matsumo, helps the women escape.

Mara is recaptured and tortured to death, and Claire and Regan are killed by rifle fire. The surviving four encounter a wounded American flyer, Lt. Bill Jackson, who helps them make their way to the beach but dies before they can reach safety. A wealthy planter, Luis Hullman, finds the girls, feigns friendship, and then attempts to hand them over to the Japanese. But the women learn of his plan, kill him, and escape by boat to the Allied lines.

== Cast ==
- Patricia Owens as Grace Ingram
- Denise Darcel as Claire Oudry
- Cesar Romero as Luis Hullman
- John Kerr as Lt. Bill Jackson
- Margia Dean as Mara Shepherd
- Yvonne Craig as Janet Cook
- Pilar Seurat as Mai-Lu Ferguson
- Sylvia Daneel as Anna Van Laer
- Richard Loo as Sgt. Takahashi
- Evadne Baker as Regan
- Bob Okazaki as Capt. Oda
- Yuki Shimoda as Dr. Matsumo
- Lloyd Kino as rapist guard
- Kam Fong as house guard
- Robert Ishibashi as truck driver

== Production ==
The film was written by Jesse Lasky Jr. and his wife, Pat Silver-Lasky for producer Robert Lippert, who had a deal with Fox to make low budget films. John Kerr was signed to star.

The film was shot in Hawaii in June 1961.

== See also ==
- List of American films of 1961
