= Secret Places =

- U.S theatrical release poster
- Directed by: Zelda Barron
- Written by: Zelda Barron
- Based on: novel by Janice Elliott
- Produced by: Simon Relph; Ann Skinner; Al Clark
- Starring: Marie Theres Relin; Tara MacGowran; Claudine Auger; Jenny Agutter
- Cinematography: Peter MacDonald
- Edited by: Laurence Méry-Clarl
- Music by: Michel Legrand
- Production companies: Skreba Films; Rank Film Distributors Ltd; Virgin Films
- Distributed by: Rank Film Distributors Ltd
- Release date: 11 May 1984
- Running time: 98 minutes
- Country: United Kingdom
- Language: English
- Budget: £1.25 million

Secret Places is a 1984 British drama film directed by Zelda Barron and starring Marie Theres Relin, Tara MacGowran, Claudine Auger and Jenny Agutter. It was based on a novel by Janice Elliott. It was one of the most popular films shown at the 1984 Toronto International Film Festival.

== Plot ==
The film, which takes place during the Second World War, tells the story of a German refugee girl sent to an English boarding school, where she bonds with an English girl.

== Cast ==
- Marie Theres Relin as Laura Meister
- Tara MacGowran as Patience
- Claudine Auger as Sophie Meister
- Jenny Agutter as Miss Lowrie
- Cassie Stuart as Nina
- Ann-Marie Gwatkin as Rose
- Pippa Hinchley as Barbara
- Sylvia Coleridge as Miss Trott
- Klaus Barner as Dr. Meister
- Rosemary Martin as Mrs. MacKenzie
- Amanda Grinling as Miss Winterton
- Veronica Clifford as Miss Mallard
- Adam Richardson as Stephen
- Zoe Caryl as Junior
- Erika Spotswood as Valerie
- Bill Ward as Mr. Watts
- Rosamund Greenwood as Hannah
- Maurice O'Connell as Police sergeant
- Margaret Lacey as Mrs. Burgess
- Marissa Dunlop as Little girl
- Mike Heywood as Soldier in train
- Andrew Byatt as Soldier in train
- Tony London as Cockney soldier
- Georgia Slowe as Cordelia
- John Henson as Jack
- Robert Kelly as Gerald
- Paul Ambrose as David
- Francisco Morales as Carlo
- Stewart Guidotti as Alfredo
- [Mark Lewis as Dino
- Jessica Walter as Girl #1 in art room
- Sian Dunlop as Girl #2 in art room
- Alan Berry as Dr. Parrish
- Lala Lloyd as Nurse
- John Segal as Al

== Production ==
Zelda Barron was a top script supervisor and production assistant who had worked on movies such as Reds and Yentl. She formed a company, Skreba Productions, which she co-founded with Simon Relph and Ann Skinner, using the first two letters of their surnames for the title. After making Return of the Soldier, they optioned a novel, Secret Places by Janice Elliot and Barron wrote the script.

Initial development funds were provided by Virgin Films. The budget was raised by the National Film Finance Corporation, Rank, and Rediffusion. Filming started August 1983.

== Reception ==
Filmink wrote the movie "was not a big hit but received nice reviews, and did the art house/festival circuit. If the leads had become stars, and/or Barron had gone on to direct other movies, it would be better known."
