= Land of Liberty =

- Directed by: Cecil B. DeMille
- Written by: Jesse L. Lasky Jr. Jeanie Macpherson
- Starring: Gayne Whitman; Erville Alderson; Don Ameche
- Narrated by: Gayne Whitman
- Edited by: Cecil B. DeMille
- Music by: Rudolph G. Kopp
- Production company: Metro-Goldwyn-Mayer
- Distributed by: Metro-Goldwyn-Mayer
- Release date: June 15, 1939
- Running time: 138 minutes
- Country: United States
- Language: English

Land of Liberty is a 1939 American documentary film written by Jesse L. Lasky Jr. and Jeanie Macpherson. The film tells the history of the United States from pre-Revolution through 1939. The film was released on June 15, 1939, by Metro-Goldwyn-Mayer.
