= The Bulldance =

1988 film directed by Zelda Barron

The Bulldance (also known as Forbidden Sun) is a 1989 British film directed by Zelda Barron. The script was written by Robin Hardy, Jesse L. Lasky Jr., and Pat Silver-Lasky.

The film centers on an Olympic gymnastics coach (Lauren Hutton) who takes 12 of her students to train in Crete. When one girl is sexually assaulted, the gym's janitor is the main suspect, but it turns out the crime may be linked to the Cretan ritual of the bull.

Filming took place in Yugoslavia, and money ran out before production was completed, making finishing the film a struggle.
