= Pirates of Tortuga =

1961 film by Robert D. Webb

- Theatrical release poster
- Directed by: Robert D. Webb
- Written by: Jesse Lasky Jr. Pat Silver; Melvin Levy
- Based on: story by Mel Levy
- Produced by: Sam Katzman
- Starring: Ken Scott; Letícia Román; Dave King; John Richardson; Rafer Johnson; Robert Stephens
- Cinematography: Ellis W. Carter
- Edited by: Hugh S. Fowler
- Music by: Paul Sawtell; Bert Shefter
- Color process: DeLuxe Color
- Production company: Clover Productions
- Distributed by: 20th Century-Fox
- Release date: October 1961 (USA)
- Running time: 97 minutes
- Country: United States
- Language: English
- Budget: $675,000

Pirates of Tortuga is a 1961 American swashbuckler adventure film which invented an alternate history for the actual Welsh privateer Henry Morgan. It was released in October 1961 in the United States in CinemaScope.

== Plot ==
In the 17th century, a Welsh captain (Ken Scott) and his crew are dispatched to the Spanish-controlled island of Tortuga, where famed privateer Henry Morgan (Robert Stephens) has defected from his support of the English empire and is running a strictly piratical venture, stopping any and all vessels, including British carriers. Since the captain cannot attack the island without incurring the wrath of the Spanish government, he must go one-on-one with Morgan himself.

A young woman (Leticia Roman) inadvertently stows away on the captain's vessel and becomes the de facto central focus of the story (Morgan doesn't appear until the latter half of the film). She is initially taken to the nearby island of Jamaica, where she briefly makes a play for the colonial governor, but eventually sets her sights on the captain himself. In the meantime, the captain engages in pursuing the pirate Morgan.

== Cast ==
- Ken Scott as Bart (captain)
- Letícia Román as Meg
- Dave King as Pee Wee
- John Richardson as Percy
- Rafer Johnson as John Gammel
- Robert Stephens as Henry Morgan
- Rachel Stephens as Phoebe
- Stanley Adams as Captain Montbars
- Edgar Barrier as Sir Thomas Mollyford
- James Forrest as Reggie
- Maxwell Reed as Major Fielding
- Patrick Sexton as Randolph
- Arthur Gould-Porter as Bonnett
- Hortense Petra as Lola
- Malcolm Cassell as Kipper

== Production ==
The film was made by Sam Katzman's unit at 20th Century-Fox. Their first film had been The Wizard of Baghdad. He did this under a verbal agreement with Buddy Adler then in September 1960 Robert Goldstein signed him to a three-picture contract. These were to be Gentlemen Pirates written by Mel Levy, a film about Mississippi gamblers written by Jesse Lasky Jr. and Pat Silver, and Cypress Gardens by Lou Morheim. In the end he wound up making only one movie at Fox, Pirates of Tortuga (1961).

Robert Webb signed to direct in December 1960. The same month, singer Dave King was signed to play a support role. Robert Stephens was then also under contract to Fox and was put in the cast. So too was Rafer Johnson. It was the first lead for Ken Scott who had been under contract to Fox for five years.

Filming started 11 January 1961. The film was shot entirely on the Fox backlot in Los Angeles, using the water tank that had been created for the TV series Adventures in Paradise. Johnson later recalled filming scenes of steering the boat "as a lot of fun, as were the scenes of fencing and hand to hand combat."

== Reception ==
The Los Angeles Times called the film "pure costume".
