= Shock Treatment (1964 film) =

1964 film by Denis Sanders

- Theatrical poster
- Directed by: Denis Sanders
- Screenplay by: Sydney Boehm
- Based on: Shock Treatment; 1961 novel by Winfred Van Atta
- Produced by: Aaron Rosenberg
- Starring: Stuart Whitman; Carol Lynley; Roddy McDowall; Lauren Bacall
- Cinematography: Sam Leavitt
- Edited by: Louis R. Loeffler
- Music by: Jerry Goldsmith
- Distributed by: Twentieth Century-Fox Film Corporation
- Release date: July 22, 1964
- Running time: 89 minutes
- Country: United States
- Language: English
- Budget: $1.285 million
- Box office: $944,000

Shock Treatment is a 1964 American neo noir drama film directed by Denis Sanders and written by Sydney Boehm, based on Winfred Van Atta's 1961 novel of the same name. Taking place in a mental institution, starring Stuart Whitman, Carol Lynley, Roddy McDowall, and Lauren Bacall. As one of many post-Psycho films dealing with insanity, Bacall disliked the film intensely, calling it the worst of her career despite its cult following in later years.

== Plot ==
Martin Ashley, a mentally ill gardener, decapitates his wealthy boss Mrs. Townsend with a pair of shears. He subsequently turns himself in to the police, and is found insane and sent to a mental institution ruled by psychiatrist Edwina Beighley. During Ashley's hearing, Beighley learns that Ashley has possibly buried $1 million belonging to the late Mrs. Townsend.

Mrs. Townsend's executor, Harley Manning, is suspicious of Ashley and hires actor Dale Nelson to simulate madness and land himself in the same institution. Dale is to locate the stolen money that Ashley might have hidden. In payment for the illegal impersonation, Manning puts $10,000 in a safety deposit box in Nelson's name, withholding the key until the mission is accomplished. Needing to feign mental illness and gain Ashley's confidence, Nelson prepares for his role by studying books on psychology and gardening. Nelson gets himself arrested by breaking a store window, railing against "conformity", and ranting about the monetary worth of chemicals in the human body.

Getting himself assigned to gardening as "occupational therapy", Nelson meets Ashley, who is initially hostile to another gardener meddling in his garden. Nelson wins him over with his botanical knowledge and admiration of the special rose that Ashley developed, winning a competition for his former employer. Nelson also becomes acquainted with another patient, Cynthia Albright, developing a personal interest in her. Cynthia has issues with men touching her but begins slowly to trust Nelson, who is understanding of her condition.

During therapy sessions, Beighley uses hypnosis on Ashley, attempting to learn where he has buried the $1 million. She is desperate for money to continue her research into catatonia. Realizing that Dale is a fraud when she finds him eavesdropping on a therapy session with Ashley, she orders an electroconvulsive therapy treatment on him as a means of torture. After he regains consciousness, she questions his motives for being there, threatening him for illegally gaining entry into the institution. He threatens to expose her for illegally administering shock treatment knowingly on a sane person. She responds to his threat by twice injecting him with drugs that leave him in states of catatonia, using him as a human guinea pig for her experimentation. A third injection will leave Nelson in a permanent catatonic state.

After regaining consciousness a second time, Nelson, in a wheelchair, must continue to feign being catatonic to avoid a third injection. When Cynthia visits him, Nelson waits until the attendant leaves to tell her of his predicament. Cynthia signals when the attendant is approaching. That evening at a dance, Ashley wheels a "catatonic" Nelson outside and begins to scold him for pretending to be his friend according to Beighley. Nelson cannot give away his consciousness even as Ashley attempts to strangle him in fury at his "betrayal". Cynthia arrives with an orderly to save him and slips him a key she has stolen. When the orderly takes Nelson to his room, Nelson attacks him and escapes from the hospital.

Fleeing to Manning's home, Nelson finds that Manning has died of a heart attack and Manning's secretary has no knowledge of the impersonation. The secretary calls the police, but Nelson overhears and manages to escape before they arrive.

Nelson arrives at the Townsend estate as Ashley and Beighley are digging a hole to retrieve the $1 million. The sack Ashley has buried contains nothing but the ashes of burnt money. Ashley snaps at Beighley, who is angry with him. When she hits him, repeatedly asking him where the money really is, Ashley attacks her; however, Dale intervenes and stops him from killing her. During the fight, Ashley is impaled by a spiked fence. Beighley's desperation for the money sends her into a state of delusion, succumbing to madness and determined to recover the money, believing it to be buried somewhere on the estate.

Nelson testifies at Beighley's sanity hearing, and she herself is institutionalized, insisting repeatedly that she knows the money exists "after 31 separate hours" of questioning Ashley. As Beighley rambles to other patients in the institution's recreational grounds, Cynthia is discharged, leaving the institution with Nelson.

== Cast ==
- Stuart Whitman as Dale Nelson / Arthur
- Carol Lynley as Cynthia Lee Albright
- Roddy McDowall as Martin Ashley
- Lauren Bacall as Dr. Edwina Beighley
- Olive Deering as Mrs. Mellon
- Ossie Davis as Capshaw
- Donald Buka as Psychologist
- Paulene Myers as Dr. Walden
- Evadne Baker as Intern
- Robert J. Wilke as Technician Mike Newton
- Bert Freed as Frank Josephson
- Judith De Hart as Matron
- Judson Laire as Harley Manning
- Simon Scott (uncredited) as Police Desk Sergeant

== Reception ==
According to Fox records, the film needed to earn $2,400,000 in film rentals to break even but made only $944,000.

== See also ==
- Shock Corridor
