= Smart-Aleck Kill =

Short story by writer Raymond Chandler

"Smart-Aleck Kill" is a short story by writer Raymond Chandler. It was first published in July 1934 in the magazine Black Mask.

== Plot ==
Private detective Mallory has been hired by a film studio to handle a blackmail threat against director Derek Walden, but Walden is uncooperative, preferring to negotiate on his own. Two armed men barge into Walden's penthouse apartment and demand payment from him. They force Mallory at gunpoint into a car and decide to hold him hostage until Walden can withdraw money from his bank, but Mallory’s taxi driver Joey helps him escape. Later, Mallory receives a call from Walden’s girlfriend worrying about him; Mallory checks on him and finds him dead from a gunshot wound to the head, made to look like suicide. Mallory enlists the help of another studio detective, Denny, and traces the gun that killed Walden to its former owner, a blonde named Helen Dalton, who is involved with John Sutro, a city councilman; she denies knowing anything. On the way out of Dalton's apartment, Mallory and his taxi driver are shot at and the driver is wounded. Denny tails the blonde and tells Mallory she tried to contact a mobster named Donner; now Denny is holding her at his home. When Mallory goes there to confront Denny, who he realizes is playing the other side, a hit squad arrives and shoots up the home with tommy guns, narrowly missing them. Mallory visits Donner at his nightclub, and is ushered into his sound proof office. Donner, who has Sutro present, along with his two henchmen, is told by Mallory that Walden is dead. Donner blames the hotheaded henchman who attacked Mallory's driver against orders, but Mallory demurs and explains the full story: Walden was involved in the dope business with Sutro, but wanted out, since the repeal of prohibition would free up police resources to focus on the dope trade. Donner's henchman was blackmailing Walden, milking a steady payday, but Sutro had too much to lose and simply killed him. Sutro hired Denny to learn what Mallory knew, and set up the hit squad attack. Donner, his henchmen, and Sutro shoot it out in the office. Sutro survives the shootout but later ends up dying, shot by a jealous wife. The police are content to contain the story to just the Walden and Sutro’s deaths in order to protect both the film studio and the city council.

== Adaptions ==
The story was made into an episode of the HBO series Philip Marlowe, Private Eye.
