= Jesse L. Lasky Jr. =

American screenwriter, novelist, playwright and poet (1910–1988)

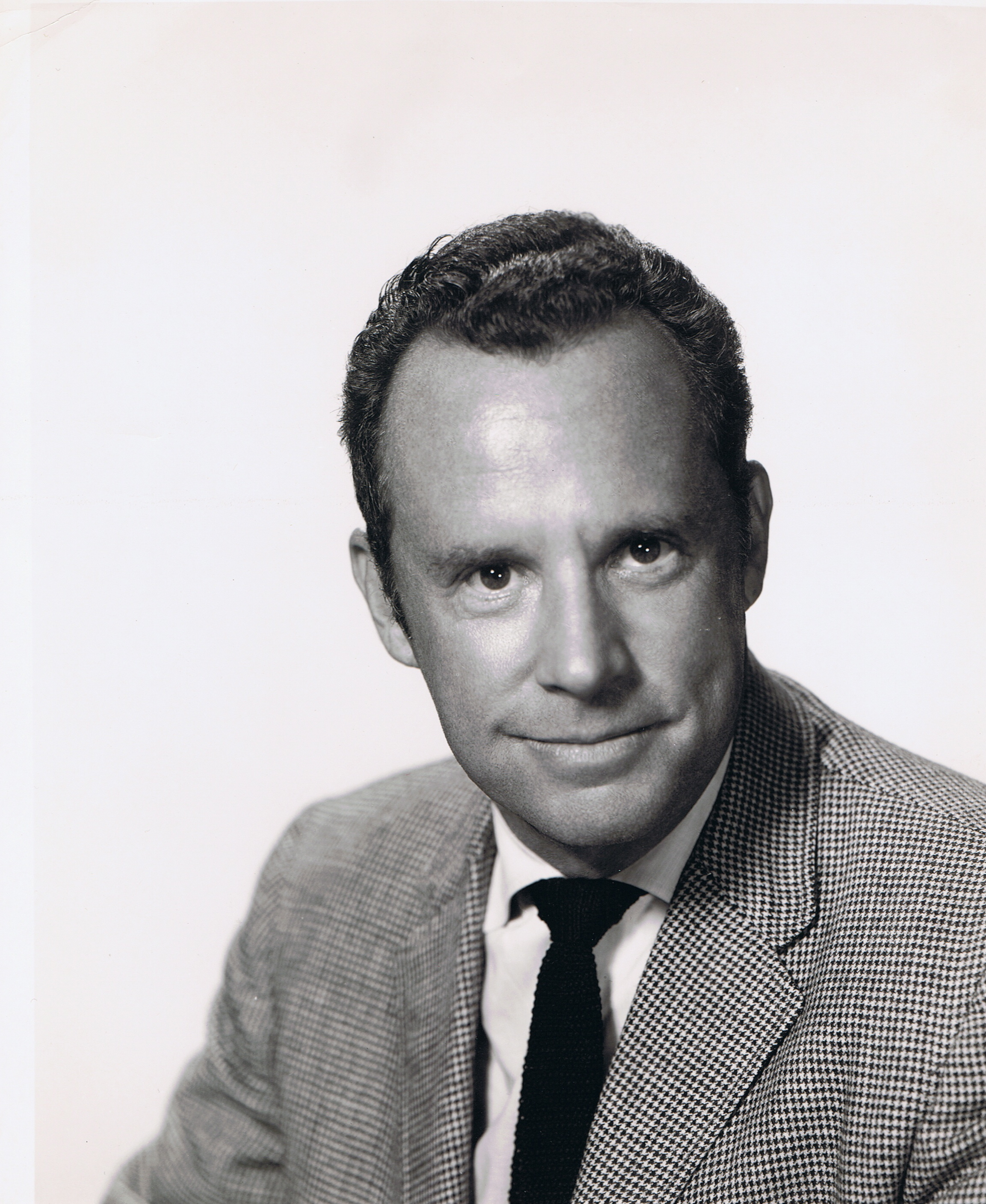
- Lasky c. 1959
- Born: Jesse Louis Lasky Jr. September 19, 1910; New York City, New York, U.S.
- Died: April 11, 1988 (aged 77); London, UK
- Resting place: Hollywood Forever Cemetery
- Education: Blair Academy; Hun School of Princeton
- Alma mater: University of Dijon
- Occupations: Screenwriter; novelist; playwright; poet
- Years active: 1920s–1988
- Notable work: Samson and Delilah; The Ten Commandments (film screenplays); Whatever Happened to Hollywood? (autobiography)
- Title: Vice President of the Writers Guild of America, Screen Branch
- Spouse: Pat Silver (m. 1959)
- Parent: Jesse Lasky Sr.
- Awards: 2 Boxoffice Magazine Awards; 1 Christopher Award

Jesse Louis Lasky Jr. (September 19, 1910 – April 11, 1988) was an American screenwriter, novelist, playwright and poet. Lasky wrote eight novels, five plays, three books of poetry and more than 50 screenplays, including eight for director Cecil B. DeMille.

== Early life ==
He was the son of film producer Jesse Lasky Sr. and his wife, Bessie Ida Ginsberg. Lasky was born on Broadway, New York, and raised in Hollywood, Los Angeles, in England and in France. He attended Blair Academy, the Hun School of Princeton, Grand Central School of Art and the University of Dijon, France, where he was awarded a degree in literature. After winning awards for poetry at the age of 17, he embarked on a career as a professional writer. He was of Jewish descent.

== Career ==
Lasky wrote eight novels, five plays, three books of poetry and more than 50 screenplays, including eight for director Cecil B. DeMille. In addition to a Christopher Award, he was a two-time winner of the Boxoffice Magazine Award: in 1949 for Samson and Delilah, and in 1956 for The Ten Commandments. Lasky's writing career took him from Hollywood to London, Rome, Austria, Denmark, Turkey, Spain, Portugal, Greece and France. David Hempstead cowritten the script for Hell and High Water (1954) alongside Lasky.

== World War II ==
During World War II, Lasky served as a captain in the Combat Photographic Units of the United States Army Signal Corps during four campaigns in the Southwest Pacific, and was decorated by General Douglas MacArthur. He organised the Army School of Film Training at the Signal Corps Photographic Center, where writers were instructed to script training films for every branch of the military service. He served in Australia.

== Later life ==
Returning home after three-and-a-half years of military duty overseas, Lasky resumed his writing career with new books, plays, and films. He lectured on creative writing and the history of Hollywood at many American and British institutions, including the Oxford Union. He also served as Vice President of the Screen Branch of the Writers Guild of America.

In 1962, Lasky and his wife, Pat Silver, moved to London. They also lived for part of the year in southern Spain, and travelled extensively. Lasky was a member of the London gentlemen's Garrick Club and the Company of Military Historians. Tsuguharu Foujita's painting of a 17-year-old Lasky, dating from a trip to Paris with his mother in the 1920s, appears on page 180 of Lasky's autobiography, Whatever Happened to Hollywood?, which was published by Funk and Wagnalls in 1975.

== Death ==
On April 11, 1988, Lasky died from pancreatic cancer. He was remembered by The New York Times as "an author and a screenwriter." He is survived by his wife, his stepson, Richard Niles, his stepdaughter, Lisa Romano and his sister, Betty Lasky.

== Writer ==
=== Film ===
- Coming Out Party (1934)
- Redhead (1934)
- The White Parade (1934)
- Music is Magic (1935)
- Secret Agent (1936)
- The Buccaneer (1938)
- Union Pacific (1939)
- Land of Liberty (1939)
- North West Mounted Police (1940)
- Back in the Saddle (1941)
- Steel Against the Sky (1941)
- The Singing Hill (1941)
- Reap the Wild Wind (1942)
- The Omaha Trail (1942)
- Unconquered (1947)
- Samson and Delilah (1949)
- The Sickle or the Cross (1949)
- Women Without Names (1950)
- Lorna Doone (1951)
- Mask of the Avenger (1951)
- Never Trust a Gambler (1951)
- The Brigand (1951)
- Venture of Faith (1951)
- Salome (1953)
- The Silver Whip (1953)
- Mission Over Korea (1953)
- The Iron Glove (1954)
- Hell and High Water (1954)
- Pearl of the South Pacific (1955)
- Hot Blood (1956)
- The Ten Commandments (1955)
- The Buccaneer (1958)
- John Paul Jones (1959)
- The Wizard of Baghdad (1960)
- 7 Women from Hell (1961)
- Pirates of Tortuga (1961)
- Land Raiders (1970)
- Crime and Passion (1976)
- The Bulldance (1989)

=== Television ===
- Waterfront (1954)
- Studio 57 (1955)
- Naked City (1958)
- Rescue 8 (1958–1959)
- Shannon (1961)
- The New Breed (1961–1962)
- The Saint (1965)
- Songs of the Wild West (1965, TV Movie)
- Chicago in the Roaring 20's (1965, TV Movie)
- Danger Man (1966)
- The Protectors (1973)
- Ben Hall (1975)
- Space: 1999 (1975)
- Philip Marlowe, Private Eye (1983–1986)
- Hammer House of Mystery and Suspense (1984)

== Producer ==
- Without Reservations (1946)
- The Miracle of the Bells (1948)

== Actor ==
- The Thief of Bagdad (1924)
