= 1984 in British radio =

This is a list of events in British radio during 1984.

== Events ==
- During 1984, the BBC continues its five-station trial of community stations in Greater Manchester. Each trial, which covers a specific area of Greater Manchester, lasts for a few weeks, broadcasts only on MW and operates for a few hours each weekday morning, opting out of BBC Radio Manchester. The trial ends in autumn 1984 and has never been repeated.

=== January ===
- 8 January – Simon Bates begins his second stint as host of BBC Radio 1's Sunday teatime Top 40 programme.
- 20 January – BBC Radio 2 makes changes to its schedule and following the decision not to renew the contract of long standing presenter Ed Stewart, the year-long revival of Music While You Work ends. Gloria Hunniford takes over Ed's slot the following week and Steve Jones replaces Hunniford on the lunchtime show.
- 21 January – On Radio 2:
  - Overnight changes see the return of Nightride and the launch of A Little Night Music which, rather than have a named presenter, is instead hosted by that night's duty announcer. Both programmes replace You and the Night and the Music which had aired between 2am and 5am.
  - Ken Bruce joins the station as a regular presenter when he takes over as the new host of the Saturday late show.
- 22 January – Sounds of Jazz moves to BBC Radio 2 from BBC Radio 1.

=== February to March ===
- No events.

=== April ===
- 5 April – BBC Radio 4 begins what is described in the Radio Times as "a new three-hour sequence – a six-month broadcast experiment in which you are invited to participate." The programme is called Rollercoaster and is presented by Richard Baker. The "Grand Finale of Radio 4's rollicking rolling experiment" takes place on 27 September and is not repeated.

=== May ===
- No events.

=== June ===
- 22 June – Princess Margaret makes a guest appearance as herself in an episode of BBC Radio 4's The Archers, becoming the first member of the Royal Family to do so. The storyline involves her making a surprise guest appearance at a charity fashion show.

=== July ===
- 27 July – David Jacobs chairs Any Questions? for the final time.
- 29 July–11 August – BBC Radio 2 provides full coverage of the 1984 Summer Olympic Games. In addition to hourly sports desks, each night the station broadcasts The Terry Wogan Olympics Show. The programme begins at 11pm and runs into the early hours.

=== August ===
- August
  - Radio Forth becomes the first Independent Local Radio station to broadcast a part-time split service. It is Festival City Radio, which provides coverage of the 1984 Edinburgh Festival.
  - Sea areas North Utsire and South Utsire (along the Norwegian coast) are added to the Met Office's Shipping Forecast as broadcast on BBC radio.

=== September ===
- 7 September – Commercial radio returns to Leicester, eleven months after Centre Radio went off air. The new service is provided by Leicester Sound.
- 14 September – John Timpson chairs Any Questions? for the first time.
- 23 September – Tony Blackburn – the first voice heard on Radio 1 – presents his final show for the station.
- 29 September –
  - The Radio 4 UK branding is dropped and the station is now officially simply known as Radio 4 and the station expands its broadcast day with the 6am start-time seven days a week - the 6.10am slot filled by Prelude, described as "musical start to your weekend listening" and the post-midnight Shipping Forecast starts being broadcast 18 minutes later than before, moving to a start-time of 12.33am. Consequently, the station is now on air every day from just before 6 am until 12:45 am.
  - Radio 1's Weekend Breakfast Show is revamped and the children's requests element of the show is dropped.
- 30 September – The first edition of The Network Chart Show is broadcast. Aired on almost all of the UK's Independent Local Radio network, the programme is presented from the studios of Capital Radio by David Jensen. On the same day, Richard Skinner takes over from Simon Bates as host of BBC Radio 1's chart show.

=== October ===
- 1 October – Three commercial stations launch, bringing commercial radio to Kent (Invicta Sound), central Norfolk (Radio Broadland) and north Cambridgeshire, south Lincolnshire and west Norfolk (Hereward Radio).
- 13 October – BBC Radio 3's broadcast hours are extended. The station closes 40 minutes later – at midnight instead of 11:20 pm, and weekend broadcasts begin an hour earlier, at 6:55 am rather than 7:55 am. Consequently, the station is now on air from 6:55 am until midnight seven days a week.

=== November ===
- November–December – Son of Cliché, 2nd series, on BBC Radio 4, includes a recurring sketch stream "Dave Hollins: Space Cadet" which forms the basis for the television show Red Dwarf.

=== December ===
- 4 December – Pennine Radio's broadcast area is expanded when the Bradford-based station starts broadcasting to Huddersfield and Halifax. The larger broadcast area comes shortly after the station had begun 24-hour broadcasting.
- 28 December – Terry Wogan ends his first run as presenter of The Radio 2 Breakfast Show. He will return to present the show between January 1993 and December 2009.

== Station debuts ==
- 17 April – Viking Radio
- 1 August - Festival City Radio
- 7 September – Leicester Sound
- 1 October –
  - Invicta Sound
  - Radio Broadland
  - Hereward Radio
- 20 October – Radio Mercury

== Programme debuts ==
- 4 April – Space Force on BBC (1984–1985)
- ? May – In One Ear on BBC Radio 4 (1984–1986)
- 3 August – Delve Special on BBC Radio 4 (1984–1987)
- 2 December – Father Brown Stories on BBC Radio 4 (1984–1986)

== Continuing radio programmes ==
=== 1940s ===
- Sunday Half Hour (1940–2018)
- Desert Island Discs (1942–Present)
- Down Your Way (1946–1992)
- Letter from America (1946–2004)
- Woman's Hour (1946–Present)
- A Book at Bedtime (1949–Present)

=== 1950s ===
- The Archers (1950–Present)
- The Today Programme (1957–Present)
- Sing Something Simple (1959–2001)
- Your Hundred Best Tunes (1959–2007)

=== 1960s ===
- Farming Today (1960–Present)
- In Touch (1961–Present)
- The World at One (1965–Present)
- The Official Chart (1967–Present)
- Just a Minute (1967–Present)
- The Living World (1968–Present)
- The Organist Entertains (1969–2018)

=== 1970s ===
- PM (1970–Present)
- Start the Week (1970–Present)
- Week Ending (1970–1998)
- You and Yours (1970–Present)
- I'm Sorry I Haven't a Clue (1972–Present)
- Good Morning Scotland (1973–Present)
- Kaleidoscope (1973–1998)
- Newsbeat (1973–Present)
- The News Huddlines (1975–2001)
- File on 4 (1977–Present)
- Money Box (1977–Present)
- The News Quiz (1977–Present)
- Breakaway (1979–1998)
- Feedback (1979–Present)
- The Food Programme (1979–Present)
- Science in Action (1979–Present)

=== 1980s ===
- Radio Active (1980–1987)
- In Business (1983–Present)
- Sounds of the 60s (1983–Present)

== Closing this year ==
- September 1st - Festival City Radio

== Births ==
- 21 February – Hannah Fry, mathematician and science broadcaster
- 9 March – Owain Wyn Evans, Welsh broadcaster
- 22 May – Clara Amfo, DJ
- 18 June – Kissy Sell Out, DJ, producer and graphic designer
- 14 August – Nick Grimshaw, music broadcast presenter
- 15 November – Nadia Ali, broadcast presenter
- 23 December – Dev (Griffin), DJ

== Deaths ==
- 1 April – René Cutforth, broadcaster (born 1909)
- 25 June – Reg Dixon, comedian (born 1915)
- 11 July – Hugh Morton, actor (born 1903)
- 14 August – J. B. Priestley, novelist, playwright and wartime radio broadcaster (born 1894)
- 6 November – Seymour de Lotbiniere, pioneer of outside broadcasts (born 1905)

== See also ==
- 1984 in British music
- 1984 in British television
- 1984 in the United Kingdom
- List of British films of 1984
