= Rescue 8 =

American adventure TV series

- Genre: Action; Adventure; Drama
- Created by: Robert G. Walker and Herbert B. Leonard
- Written by: Cy Chermak; Loren Dayle; George Draine; Jesse Lasky, Jr. Arthur Rowe; Jerry Thomas
- Directed by: William Beaudine; Dann Cahn; Robert G. Walker; William Witney
- Starring: Jim Davis; Lang Jeffries; Nancy Rennick; Mary K. Cleary
- Country of origin: United States
- Original language: English
- No. of seasons: 2
- No. of episodes: 73

Production
- Executive producer: Herbert B. Leonard
- Producers: Robert G. Walker & Leroy Smith
- Production locations: Los Angeles, California
- Running time: 30 mins.
- Production companies: Cinefilm; Wilbert Productions

Original release
- Network: Syndicated
- Release: September 23, 1958 – May 12, 1960

Rescue 8 is a syndicated American action adventure drama series about Los Angeles County Fire Department (LACFD) Rescue Squad 8. It premiered in 1958 and originally ran for two seasons. Syndicated reruns continued for almost a decade thereafter.

== Premise, cast, and characters ==
Rescue 8, like twenty-six other rescue units with the LACFD, responded when people faced life-and-death situations. Attached to Fire House Station 8, the unit was headed by veteran rescueman Wes Cameron. Skip Johnson was his assistant.

The show starred Jim Davis as Wes Cameron and Lang Jeffries as Skip Johnson. Nancy Rennick portrayed Patty Johnson, and Mary K. Cleary portrayed Susan Johnson, the wife and daughter, respectively of Skip Johnson. Tom McKee played the chief.

== Production ==
Created by George Draine and Paul Frees, the series was produced by Screen Gems, with directors Dann Cahn and William Witney. Rescue 8 produced 73 half-hour episodes. The first season ran on Tuesday evenings, and the second season on Wednesdays. Bert Leonard was the producer.

Davis and Jeffries learned fire department procedures at a training school, and they did most stunts themselves.

== Selected episodes ==
In the series premiere, "The Ferris Wheel" (September 23, 1958), the firemen must devise a plan to retrieve a woman, who was recently released from a mental institution (Jeanne Bates), and her young daughter (Gina Gillespie) from the top of a Ferris wheel on which they are trapped. Rand Brooks guest stars in the first of his two appearances as Tom Hickey.

In "Subterranean City" (October 14, 1958), rescuers Wes and Skip search for a lost girl in the sewer tunnels and encounter three criminals hiding out underground, one of whom is Skip's nephew, Pete, played by Warren Oates. Pete breaks with his companions and joins the firemen in finding the child.

In "The Cave-In" (December 2, 1958), Will Wright played an elderly man who attempts with shovel and bucket to build a backyard swimming pool for his grandchildren with disastrous results because of the lack of proper shoring.

In "The Bells of Fear" (December 9, 1958), an elderly clockmaker who is trying to repair the chimes in a church clock is trapped inside the instrument just before Christmas Eve. Joe Flynn and Russell Johnson appear in this episode.

In "Calamity Coach" (December 30, 1958), Wes Cameron and Skip Johnson seek to rescue three actors on location when a stagecoach tumbles down a mountain, Douglas Kennedy guest stars.

In "The Secret of the Mission" (January 6, 1959), J. Pat O'Malley plays a priest who is trapped with a would-be thief named Carlos (Rafael Campos) under the roof of a collapsed church.

In "Disaster Town" (February 17, 1959), Gail Kobe plays Ellen Mason, a mother looking for her son, Jimmy, in a ghost town. Jay North, some six months before the premiere of his CBS situation comedy, Dennis the Menace, played the missing son. Craig Hill, the co-star of Whirlybirds, played the father, Chuck Mason. The rescue team is called when the woman is trapped after falling through the floor of an abandoned building.

In "A Handful of Vengeance" (February 24, 1959), Pete Brocco played Stephano, a deranged pyromaniac, who threatens the lives of a warden, his wife, and their two children and then turns on the rescuers as well.

In "International Incident" (March 17, 1959), Robert Cabal plays a foreign prince, Raj Tamal, who is trapped in an automobile accident and is also the target of an assassin, portrayed by Vito Scotti. Denver Pyle guest stars as Sergeant Frank Hogan.

In "The Third Strike" (December 2, 1959), John Beradino, a professional baseball player-turned-actor, was cast in the role of a baseball player who loses consciousness when struck by a wild pitch. He soon awakes with short-term amnesia.

On January 6, 1960, Jay Silverheels of The Lone Ranger played an American Indian fireman fighting a forest fire in the episode "Leap of Life".

In "Breakdown" (March 31, 1960), one of the last episodes of Rescue 8, Robert Redford plays Danny Tilford, a mentally-disturbed young man trapped in the wreckage of his family garage.

== Other guest stars ==
- Lee Aaker
- John Archer
- Malcolm Atterbury
- Roy Barcroft
- Charles Bateman
- James Best
- Patricia Blair
- Walter Burke
- John Carradine
- Wally Cassell
- Richard Chamberlain
- Virginia Christine
- Mike Connors
- Ellen Corby
- Robert Cornthwaite
- Walter Coy
- Joel Crothers
- Michael Dante
- Douglas Dick
- Don Durant
- Ross Elliott
- Bill Erwin
- Frank Ferguson
- Dabbs Greer
- James Griffith
- Gloria Henry
- Tommy Ivo
- Brad Johnson
- Robert Karnes
- William Kendis
- Brett King
- Ruta Lee
- Suzanne Lloyd
- Ann McCrea
- John McKee
- Tyler McVey
- Dennis Moore
- James Philbrook
- William Phipps
- John M. Pickard
- Richard Rust
- Walter Sande
- Johnny Seven
- Hal Smith
- Harry Dean Stanton
- Naomi Stevens
- Hope Summers
- William Swan
- Jack Weston
- Robert Warwick
- Francine York

== Comparisons ==
The real Los Angeles County Fire Department Station 8 is at 7643 West Santa Monica Boulevard in West Hollywood, California. The real Station 8 was also depicted as "Station 10" in the opening scenes of the pilot movie for Emergency! in 1972.

The Rescue 8 truck depicted in the series was a 1958 GMC Suburban equipped with classic, front-bumper General Motors "dagmars". According to several Internet sources, the real Rescue 8 squad that existed during the 1958–60 timeframe of the series employed the use of a 1956 Chevrolet panel-van truck (a somewhat less robust version of the nearly identical GMC truck).

Rescue 8 shows more physically oriented rescues than seen 14 years later in the debut of the television series Emergency! (1972–77), which also featured the Los Angeles County Fire Department's rescue squads. The latter show had physically oriented rescues, but also included emergency medical rescues. This is because rescue firemen were not then trained as paramedics until 12 years after the premier of Rescue 8, acquiring this expanded role with the passage of the Wedsworth-Townsend Pilot Paramedic Act in 1970. The creation of Paramedic Act itself was the main plot theme of the pilot movie of Emergency!.

== Episodes ==
=== Season 1 (1958–59) ===
No. overall	No. in season	Title	Directed by	Written by	Original release date
1	1	"The Ferris Wheel"	Robert G. Walker	Story by : George Draine; Teleplay by : Gene L. Coon & Stirling Silliphant	September 23, 1958
2	2	"102 to Bakersfield"	Robert G. Walker	Stirling Silliphant	September 30, 1958
3	3	"The Cliff"	Robert G. Walker	Howard J. Green	October 7, 1958
4	4	"The Subterranean City"	Robert G. Walker	Jesse L. Lasky Jr.	October 14, 1958
5	5	"The Cage"	Robert G. Walker	Jesse L. Lasky Jr.	October 21, 1958
6	6	"The Crackup"	Robert G. Walker	Story by : Arthur W. Rowe; Teleplay by : Wilton Schiller & Jack Laird	October 28, 1958
7	7	"The Ammonia Trap"	Unknown	Story by : Teleplay by :	November 4, 1958
8	8	"The Chasm"	William J. Hole Jr.	Jack Gariss	November 11, 1958
9	9	"The Steel Mountain"	Unknown	Story by : Teleplay by :	November 18, 1958
10	10	"Find That Bomb!"	Unknown	Story by : Teleplay by :	November 25, 1958
11	11	"The Cave-In"	Robert G. Walker	Jerry Thomas & Howard J. Green	December 2, 1958
12	12	"The Bells of Fear"	Robert G. Walker	Story by : George Draine; Teleplay by : Jesse L. Lasky Jr.	December 9, 1958
13	13	"Danger! 20,000 Volts"	Robert G. Walker	Jerry Thomas	December 16, 1958
14	14	"The Scrap Iron Jungle"	Robert G. Walker	Jesse L. Lasky Jr.	December 23, 1958
15	15	"Calamity Coach"	Unknown	Story by : Teleplay by :	December 30, 1958
16	16	"Secret of the Mission"	Unknown	Story by : Teleplay by :	January 6, 1959
17	17	"Trial by Fire"	William Beaudine	Story by : Teleplay by :	January 13, 1959
18	18	"High Hazard"	Unknown	Story by : Teleplay by :	January 20, 1959
19	19	"Rubber Gold"	Unknown	Story by : Teleplay by :	January 27, 1959
20	20	"Flash Flood"	Lew Landers	Jesse L. Lasky Jr.	February 3, 1959
21	21	"Initiation to Danger"	Unknown	Story by : Teleplay by :	February 10, 1959
22	22	"Disaster Town"	William Beaudine	Story by : Gene Feldman; Teleplay by : Jesse L. Lasky Jr. & Jerry Thomas	February 17, 1959
23	23	"A Handful of Vengeance"	Robert G. Walker	Jesse L. Lasky Jr.	February 24, 1959
24	24	"Forty Five Fathoms, Dead or Alive"	Robert G. Walker	Cy Chermak	March 3, 1959
25	25	"Children of the Sun"	Robert G. Walker	Story by : Stanley H. Silverman; Teleplay by : Jerry Thomas	March 10, 1959
26	26	"International Incident"	Unknown	Jerry Thomas	March 17, 1959
27	27	"Nine Minutes to Live"	Unknown	Story by : Teleplay by :	March 24, 1959
28	28	"No Trespassing"	Unknown	Story by : Teleplay by :	March 31, 1959
29	29	"Three Men in a Vault"	Unknown	Jesse L. Lasky Jr.	April 7, 1959
30	30	"The Walking Death"	William Beaudine	Story by : Teleplay by :	April 14, 1959
31	31	"Tower of Hate"	Unknown	Arthur Rowe	April 21, 1959
32	32	"Danger in Paradise"	Unknown	Jesse L. Lasky Jr.	April 28, 1959
33	33	"Hour of Rage"	Unknown	Story by : Teleplay by :	May 5, 1959
34	34	"If the Bough Breaks"	William Beaudine	Jesse L. Lasky Jr.	May 12, 1959
35	35	"High Pressure"	Unknown	Story by : Teleplay by :	May 19, 1959
36	36	"One More Step"	Robert G. Walker	Jerry Thomas	May 26, 1959
37	37	"Left Hook to Hades"	Robert G. Walker	Jerry Thomas	June 2, 1959
38	38	"The Trap"	William J. Hole Jr.	Jack Gariss	June 9, 1959
39	39	"Death for Hire"	William Beaudine	Arthur Rowe	June 16, 1959

=== Season 2 (1959–60) ===
No. overall	No. in season	Title	Directed by	Written by	Original release date
40	1	"Suitcase Fireman"	Robert G. Walker	Story by : Teleplay by :	September 23, 1959
41	2	"The Rock Prison"	Unknown	Story by : Teleplay by :	September 30, 1959
42	3	"Fool's Gold"	Unknown	Story by : Teleplay by :	October 7, 1959
43	4	"Paid in Full"	Unknown	Story by : Teleplay by :	October 14, 1959
44	5	"Dangerous Salvage"	Robert G. Walker	Story by : Teleplay by :	October 21, 1959
45	6	"3 Mile Bomb"	Unknown	Story by : Teleplay by :	October 28, 1959
46	7	"Not for Glory"	Unknown	Story by : Teleplay by :	November 4, 1959
47	8	"Forced Landing"	Unknown	Story by : Teleplay by :	November 11, 1959
48	9	"Smashout"	Unknown	Story by : Teleplay by :	November 18, 1959
49	10	"Runaway"	Unknown	Story by : Teleplay by :	November 25, 1959
50	11	"The Third Strike"	Unknown	Story by : Teleplay by :	December 2, 1959
51	12	"Pitfall"	Unknown	Story by : Teleplay by :	December 9, 1959
52	13	"Heat Wave"	Unknown	Story by : Teleplay by :	December 16, 1959
53	14	"The Birdman"	Unknown	Story by : Teleplay by :	December 23, 1959
54	15	"The Collision"	Unknown	Story by : Teleplay by :	December 30, 1959
55	16	"Leap of Life"	Unknown	Story by : Teleplay by :	January 6, 1960
56	17	"The Squatters"	Unknown	Story by : Teleplay by :	January 13, 1960
57	18	"Backfire"	Unknown	Story by : Teleplay by :	January 20, 1960
58	19	"High Explosive"	Unknown	Story by : Teleplay by :	January 27, 1960
59	20	"Add a Pinch of Death"	Unknown	Story by : Teleplay by :	February 3, 1960
60	21	"Ten Minutes to Doomsday"	Unknown	Story by : Teleplay by :	February 10, 1960
61	22	"Square Triangle"	Unknown	Story by : Teleplay by :	February 17, 1960
62	23	"Ti-Ling"	Unknown	Story by : Teleplay by :	February 24, 1960
63	24	"Lifeline"	Unknown	Story by : Teleplay by :	March 3, 1960
64	25	"High Lonely"	Unknown	Story by : Teleplay by :	March 10, 1960
65	26	"Comeback"	Unknown	Story by : Teleplay by :	March 17, 1960
66	27	"Quicksand"	Unknown	Story by : Teleplay by :	March 24, 1960
67	28	"Breakdown"	Unknown	Story by : Teleplay by :	March 31, 1960
68	29	"School for Violence"	Unknown	Story by : Teleplay by :	April 7, 1960
69	30	"The Devil's Cavern"	Unknown	Story by : Teleplay by :	April 14, 1960
70	31	"13 Stories Up"	Unknown	Story by : Teleplay by :	April 21, 1960
71	32	"Deep Danger"	Unknown	Story by : Teleplay by :	April 28, 1960
72	33	"I Don't Remember"	Unknown	Story by : Teleplay by :	May 5, 1960
73	34	"Second Team"	Unknown	Story by : Teleplay by :	May 12, 1960
