= Automan =

American television series

- Walter (Desi Arnaz Jr.) and Automan (Chuck Wagner)
- Genre: Superhero; Science fiction; Comedy
- Created by: Glen A. Larson
- Starring: Desi Arnaz Jr.; Chuck Wagner; Heather McNair; Robert Lansing; Gerald S. O'Loughlin
- Theme music composer: Billy Hinsche
- Composers: Stu Phillips (1.1, 1.3, 1.4, 1.7); Peter T. Meyers (1.10, 1.11, 1.12); Ken Harrison (1.6, 1.8); Morton Stevens (1.5, 1.9); J.A.C. Redford (1.13)
- Country of origin: United States
- Original language: English
- No. of seasons: 1
- No. of episodes: 13 (1 unaired)

Production
- Executive producers: Glen A. Larson; Larry Brody
- Producers: Donald Kushner; Peter Locke
- Production locations: 20th Century Fox Studios - 10201 Pico Blvd., Century City, Los Angeles, California, USA
- Running time: 50 minutes
- Production companies: 20th Century Fox Television; The Kushner-Locke Company; Glen A. Larson Productions

Original release
- Network: ABC
- Release: December 15, 1983 – April 2, 1984

Automan is an American superhero television series produced by Glen A. Larson. It aired for 12 episodes (although 13 were made) on ABC between 1983 and 1984. It consciously emulates the visual stylistics of the Walt Disney Pictures live-action film Tron, in the context of a superhero TV series. The series was later shown in reruns on the Sci-Fi Channel.

The series starred Desi Arnaz Jr. as Walter Nebicher, a police officer and computer programmer who creates an artificially intelligent crime-fighting program, and Chuck Wagner as the titular holographic superhero. Despite the show's visual similarities to Tron, no computer-generated effects were used on the series due to budget constraints; Automan and his companion Cursor were instead brought to life through traditional animation and practical effects.

== Synopsis ==
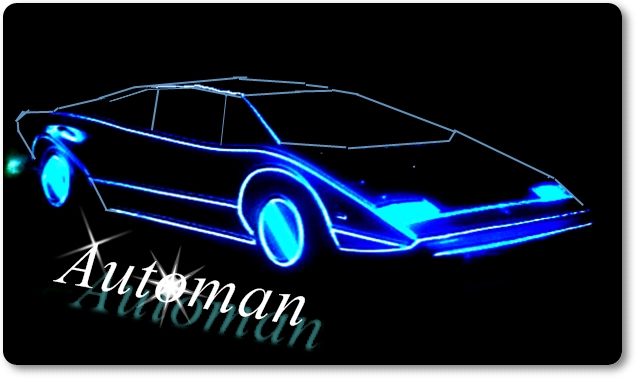
The show's car

Automan (the "Automatic Man") follows the adventures of police officer and computer programmer Walter Nebicher (Desi Arnaz Jr.), who has created an artificially intelligent crimefighting computer program that generates a hologram (played by Chuck Wagner) able to leave the computer world at night and fight crime.

While in the tangible world, Automan poses as Walter's friend, government agent Otto J. Mann. This is a secret to all except Walter's close associate Roxanne Caldwell (Heather McNair). Meanwhile, in the computer world from which Automan originates, he has met such luminaries as Donkey Kong.

Nebicher can merge with Automan to become one being, sharing consciousness and skills, while retaining Automan's invulnerability.

Automan's sidekick is Cursor, a floating, shifting polyhedron which can "draw" and generate physical objects as needed. The most common forms taken are an automobile (the Autocar), an airplane, and a helicopter (the Autochopper), all of which can defy the laws of physics.

The show also stars Robert Lansing as Lieutenant Jack Curtis and Gerald S. O'Loughlin as Captain of Detectives E. G. Boyd, both Walter's superiors. Both believe Automan is a friend of Walter from the FBI. Captain Boyd, a technophobe who had no use for computers, often holds up Lieutenant Curtis as the kind of cop he was convinced was the ideal for police – an ideal to which he believes Walter could never rise.

== Features ==
The Automan costume appeared to glow on screen due to its retroreflective sheeting designed by 3M. The fabric consisted of tiny reflective balls, and could reflect nearly 100 percent of light shone at it (the technique was used several years earlier for Kryptonian costumes in Superman). The costume also had highly polished plates attached to it to provide the holographic appearance, all enhanced in post-production through chromakey effects.

The Autocar and Autochopper were the most common vehicles created for transport. Each vehicle would appear or disappear as a sequence of wireframes drawn by Cursor, and were engineered by the special effects team using black props with strips of reflective tape stuck on them. The Autocar was a "brought to life" in the fictional world of the television series by the special effects (FX) team using a real life Lamborghini Countach LP400 as a model. In the fictional world of the television series, the Autocar had capabilities beyond real world physics, like the ability to make 90-degree turns without losing control and overtake merely by strafing (moving sideways) rather than turning. However, human passengers not properly secured in their seats were often thrown around inside with the momentum from the sudden position change. The FX team's Autochopper was based on a real life Bell Jetranger. The fictional Autochopper had capabilities no real world helicopter had, such as the ability to land anywhere. The show also featured a futuristic airplane and motorcycle, while other episodes featured a distinctive handgun and a guitar.

Another prominent feature of the fictional Automan was his ability to "wrap himself" around Walter as a means of protecting him. They would appear as one person, but because Walter was inside Automan, he would inadvertently end up speaking in two voices.

Despite Automan's many fictional powers, he also had his weaknesses. Automan's excessive use of electricity would often mean he would suffer from power shortage during the daytime, so he was rarely active in sunlight.

== Cancellation ==
Automan was put in the Monday 8 PM ET timeslot where it competed with the popular Scarecrow and Mrs. King as well as TV's Bloopers & Practical Jokes. Because of poor ratings (13.6) and expensive special effects, Automan was canceled after twelve of its thirteen episodes had aired.

== Cast ==
- Desi Arnaz Jr. – Walter Nebicher
- Chuck Wagner – Automan / Otto J. Mann
- Robert Lansing – Lieutenant Jack Curtis
- Gerald S. O'Loughlin – Police Captain E. G. Boyd
- Heather McNair – Roxanne Caldwell

== US television ratings ==
Season	Episodes	Start date	End date	Nielsen rank	Nielsen rating
1983–84	13	December 15, 1983	April 2, 1984	66	13.6 (Note: Tied with "Mama's Family" and "The Mississippi")

== Episodes ==
No.	Title	Directed by	Written by	Original release date	Prod. code
1	"Automan"	Lee H. Katzin	Glen A. Larson	December 15, 1983	2-M00
Walter Nebicher is a young police officer who wants desperately to get out on the streets and experience some action. Unfortunately, his superior Captain Boyd has assigned Nebicher to a desk job where he can utilize his skills as a computer expert.
2	"Staying Alive While Running a High Flashdance Fever"	Winrich Kolbe	Glen A. Larson	December 22, 1983	2-M01
Walter and Automan investigate a judge that appears to be corrupt and involved with the mob, The Mob are a dangerous undercover regime and capture Roxanne Caldwell. They bind and gag her in the back of a car before Automan eventually rescues her. This episode's title references the films Staying Alive, Flashdance and Saturday Night Fever.
3	"The Great Pretender"	Kim Manners	Sam Egan	December 29, 1983	2-M02
When a truck load of paper the government uses to print money is hijacked, Automan, with the help of Cursor, poses as a rich criminal competing to undermine the existing network of a known criminal dealing in counterfeit money.
4	"Ships in the Night"	Bob Claver	Parke Perine	January 5, 1984	2-M04
Walter and Auto fly to San Cristobal to investigate the disappearances of Americans. They discover a man, aided by the local authorities, that lures investors in order to kill them and take their money.
5	"Unreasonable Facsimile"	Winrich Kolbe	Sam Egan	January 12, 1984	2-M06
Automan and Walter attempt to solve the murder of a businessman and the crash of a police helicopter. Meanwhile, Automan begins acting peculiar after watching soap operas on television.
6	"Flashes and Ashes"	Kim Manners	Douglas Heyes, Jr.	January 19, 1984	2-M05
Walter's friend and fellow cop Frank Cooney is killed during a theft of police weaponry. When Internal Affairs believes Frank was involved, Walter is suspended when he and Automan interfere trying to prove his friend's innocence.
7	"The Biggest Game in Town"	Winrich Kolbe	Story by : Larry Brody & Shel Willens; Teleplay by : Larry Brody	January 26, 1984	2-M03
Automan and Walter attend a computer game convention where they must track down Ronald Tilson, a computer genius who has programmed computers to cause disasters that will kill people unless he gets ten million dollars.
8	"Renegade Run"	Allen Baron	Story by : Larry Brody; Teleplay by : Larry Brody & Douglas Heyes, Jr.	March 5, 1984	2-M08
When Walter investigates a crooked sheriff who is using illegal immigrants for manual labor, he and a friend are put in jail. Automan teams up with a motorcycle gang to free him.
9	"Murder MTV"	Bruce Seth Green	Story by : Guerdon Trueblood; Teleplay by : Douglas Heyes, Jr.	March 12, 1984	2-M11
Walter and Automan investigate an apparent attempt to kill the members of an all-female rock band called Sweet Kicks. Their investigation is hampered when the father of one of the women seeks assistance from a crime syndicate. Laura Branigan guest stars and performs "Hot Night", "Gloria" and "Satisfaction".
10	"Murder, Take One"	Kim Manners	Sam Egan	March 19, 1984	2-M09
Former movie star Veronica Everly is a suspect in the murder of gossip columnist Ray Gillette. However, when Automan discovers that a Hollywood producer had a greater motive for murder, he goes undercover as an actor to catch the real killer.
11	"Zippers"	Alan Crosland	David Garber & Bruce Kalish	March 26, 1984	2-M10
Automan goes undercover as an erotic dancer in a ladies-only strip club.
12	"Death by Design"	Gil Bettman	Sam Egan	April 2, 1984	2-M12
When a ruthless crime syndicate kills one of Jack's best friends, Automan poses as a vigilante cop by the name of Mad Dog who is out for justice.
13	"Club Ten"	Kim Manners	Michael S. Baser & Kim Weiskopf	Unaired (Note: "Club Ten" was broadcast on 23 of August 1984 on the UK channel BBC1 and years later on the Sci-Fi Channel, and on Bravo, also in the UK.)	2-M07
The exclusive Club Ten resort is a center for diamond smuggling. When Laura Ferguson stumbles on this secret she manages to put out an SOS call to her old friend Roxanne before being taken prisoner. Roxanne, Walter and Automan are soon on the trail of the missing Laura, unaware they themselves are being trailed.

== DVD release ==
On October 1, 2012, Fabulous Films released the complete series on DVD in the UK. This was the first DVD release of the series anywhere in the world.

On August 18, 2015, the show was released on DVD in Australia as a four disc set through Madman Entertainment.

On November 10, 2015, Shout! Factory released the complete series on DVD in Region 1 for the very first time. The 4-disc set featured all 13 episodes of the series as well as bonus features.

== Merchandise ==
Automan merchandise was released, mostly in the UK. An action figure, Halloween costume, toy Autocar, Commodore 64 video game and novelization of the pilot episode are among some of the many releases. In the US, the Ja-Ru company released a number of toys based on the show, designed to be sold in supermarkets. Such items included toy print sets, money sets, and binoculars.
