= Zelda Barron =

British director, screenwriter, and producer

- Born: Zelda Ruth Solomons; 31 March 1929; Manchester, England
- Died: 14 August 2006 (aged 77); Ireland
- Occupation: Filmmaker
- Children: 2, including director Steve Barron

Zelda Barron (nee Zelda Ruth Solomons, 31 March 1929 – 14 August 2006) was a British director, screenwriter, and producer known for films like Shag, Secret Places, and The Bulldance.

Barron was born in Manchester, the fifth of six children born to a Russian Jewish father tailor and an English mother from a wealthy family. She wanted to attend university, but her parents pushed her to go to secretarial school. She married British actor Ron Barron in 1953 while working as a secretary in the British film industry. By the 1960s, she was working as a script supervisor at Woodfall Film Productions on films like If... and Isadora, eventually gaining recognition for her talents as a script doctor on films like Reds and Yentl.

Under Skreba Productions, which she co-founded with Simon Relph and Ann Skinner, Barron worked on her own films, including Secret Places, which she wrote and directed. She is also known for her work as a music video director; she directed four videos for Boy George in the 1980s.

Barron retired from filmmaking after being diagnosed with Alzheimer's disease. She died in Ireland at the age of 77. Her son, Steve, is also a filmmaker, and her daughter, Siobhan, is a costume designer.
