= Philip Marlowe, Private Eye =

Television series

- Genre: Mystery; Period drama
- Written by: Raymond Chandler; Jo Eisinger; George Markstein; Jeremy Hole; Jesse L. Lasky Jr.; Pat Silver-Lasky; Murray Smith; Jaron Summers
- Directed by: Bryan Forbes; Sidney Hayers; Peter R. Hunt; Robert Iscove; Allan King; Mark Lavant
- Starring: Powers Boothe
- Opening theme: "Marlowe's Theme" by Moe Koffman
- Composers: John Cameron; Samuel Matlovsky
- Countries of origin: United States; United Kingdom
- Original language: English
- No. of seasons: 2
- No. of episodes: 11

Production
- Executive producer: Gabriel Katzka
- Producers: Jon Slan; David Wickes
- Cinematography: Frank Beascoechea; Rene Ohashi; Michael Reed
- Editors: Bill Lenny; Ronald Sanders
- Running time: 45–48 minutes

Original release
- Network: HBO (US); ITV (UK)
- Release: April 16, 1983 – June 3, 1986

Philip Marlowe, Private Eye is an American mystery series that aired on HBO in the United States from April 16, 1983, through June 3, 1986, and on ITV in the United Kingdom. The series features Powers Boothe as Raymond Chandler's title character, and was the first drama produced for HBO. Unlike other modern incarnations of the Marlowe character, the HBO series kept the show set in the 1930s, true to the original Raymond Chandler stories.

== Synopsis ==
The series chronicles the cases of private detective Philip Marlowe. Set in Los Angeles during the 1930s, storylines were adapted from Chandler's short stories. Philip Marlowe, Private Eye aired in two short runs beginning in April 1983 to June 1983 in the United States and May 1984 in the United Kingdom. The second run began in April 1986 and ended in June 1986.

== Cast ==
- Powers Boothe as Philip Marlowe
- Kathryn Leigh Scott as Annie Riordan (first season)
- William Kearns as Lieutenant Victor "Violets" Magee (first season)

== Episodes ==
=== Season 1 (1983) ===
No. overall	No. in season	Title	Directed by	Written by	Original release date
1	1	"The Pencil"	Peter R. Hunt	Jo Eisinger	16 April 1983
Marlowe is hired to protect a former mob accountant, Sal Vaccaro. The mob is gunning for him after he cooked the books and ran off with their money. Marlowe hides Vaccaro out in a hotel to evade the assassins, with the help of his Girl Friday, Annie Riordan, but it soon becomes clear that Marlowe is being played. Guest star: Kathryn Leigh Scott.
1	2	"The King in Yellow"	Bryan Forbes	Jesse L. Lasky, Jr.	23 April 1983
Brash musician King Leopardi is at the top of the charts, but somebody has made him Number 1 with a bullet. He winds up dead in a singer's bed, and Marlowe needs to figure out who killed the King. The suspects range from jilted lovers to angry managers, and a note that leads Marlowe to a motorcyclist who trades gunshots before the case is all wrapped up. Guest star: Lise Hilboldt.
1	3	"Finger Man"	Sidney Hayers	Jo Eisinger	30 April 1983
Hiring Marlowe is proving to be hazardous to one's health. After two clients end up dead and when he is framed for doing in one of them, Marlowe must battle with the cops, the mob and a grand jury investigation to get out of a frame. And what a frame - they've got his gun as the murder weapon and $25,000 the victim had given to Marlowe for safe keeping. With trouble from all sides and a beautiful woman who may not be what she seems, Marlowe tries to finger the right man before he takes the fall. Guest star: Gayle Hunnicutt.
1	4	"Nevada Gas"	David Wickes	David Wickes	7 May 1983
A hotshot lawyer from Reno is killed, and the cops are quick to blame a beaten-down old rival of Marlowe's. But Marlowe isn't so sure, and sets out to clear him. The trail leads to Annie Riordan's new beau and a pair of killers with a very deadly car that doubles as a gas chamber. Marlowe has to nab the killers before he becomes the next victim of the deadly "Nevada gas." Guest star: John Terry.
1	5	"Smart Aleck Kill"	Peter R. Hunt	Jesse L. Lasky, Jr.	14 May 1983
The job of acting as security for a young Hollywood star grows more complicated when Marlowe discovers the actor is dead, and his doctor and the movie studio are trying to cover it up. Now, Marlowe is up to his neck in scandal, drugs and blackmail. And to make matters worse, there's a guy with a tommy gun and an itchy trigger finger who's out to keep Marlowe quiet, for keeps.

=== Season 2 (1986) ===
No. overall	No. in season	Title	Directed by	Written by	Original release date
2	1	"Blackmailers Don't Shoot"	Allan King	Jeremy Hole	27 April 1986
Marlowe is hired by a mobster to protect his actress girlfriend, who is inadvertently kidnapped. Guest stars: Melody Anderson, Allan Royal.
2	2	"Spanish Blood"	Robert Iscove	Jeremy Hole, George Markstein	4 May 1986
Marlowe investigates the death of his friend Spanish, a lawyer who was running for DA against a corrupt incumbent. Guest stars: Helen Shaver, John Vernon.
2	3	"Pickup on Noon Street"	Robert Iscove	Jeremy Hole	11 May 1986
Marlowe's out to find the killer of a young girl, but he may have the chance to save another one. When he comes to the aid of Token Ware, a cigarette girl in a nightclub, Marlowe gets fingered by the law as the prime suspect in an extortion scheme. Now, he has to tangle with an actor who's got shady tastes in young women, his agent who only wants to keep it quiet, a club owner who's as slimy as they come and a musclebound thug who only wants Marlowe dead. Guest stars: Kate Trotter, Robin Givens.
2	4	"Guns at Cyrano's"	Robert Iscove	Jeremy Hole	18 May 1986
Benny Cyrano owns a nightclub, a gym, and Duke Targo, who could become the next champ. But somebody's pressuring Duke to take a dive in his next fight, so Cyrano hires Marlowe to make sure it doesn't happen. The shakedown seems to be linked to Duke's girl, Jean, and when Marlowe discovers a link to the new boxing commissioner, he has to act fast before somebody goes down for the count... for good. Guest stars: Roxanne Hart, Cec Linder.
2	5	"Trouble Is My Business"	Robert Iscove	Jeremy Hole	25 May 1986
A millionaire hires Marlowe to break up the budding romance between his naive nephew and a gold-digging social climber. Guest stars: Kate Reid, Jennifer Dale.
2	6	"Red Wind"	Martin Lavut	Jaron Summers	3 June 1986
Anything can happen when the Santa Ana wind blows through town, as a murder in a bar sets Marlowe off on a new case. There's a woman with a secret, a missing pearl necklace, an affair that could destroy a career, and another corpse before the dust settles. Guest star: Maury Chaykin, Linda Griffiths.

== Awards and nominations ==
Year	Award	Result	Category	Recipient
1983	CableACE Awards	Nominated	Actor in a Dramatic Presentation	Powers Boothe
1987	CableACE Awards	Nominated	Actress in a Dramatic Series	Kate Reid (For episode "Trouble Is My Business")
1987	Canadian Society of Cinematographers Awards	Nominated	Best Cinematography in TV Drama	Rene Ohashi
1986	Gemini Awards	Nominated	Best Writing in a Dramatic Program/Series (TV Adaptation)	Jeremy Hole
1986	Gemini Awards	Nominated	Best Photography in a Dramatic Program or Series	Rene Ohashi
1986	Gemini Awards	Nominated	Best Pay TV Drama	Jon Slan
1986	Gemini Awards	Nominated	Best Music Composition for a Series (Dramatic Underscore)	Samuel Matlovsky
