= Simon Relph =

British film producer

- Born: 13 April 1940
- Died: 30 October 2016 (aged 76)
- Occupations: Film producer, Assistant film director
- Years active: 1962–2004

Simon George Michael Relph, CBE (13 April 1940 – 30 October 2016) was a British film producer and assistant film director.

== Biography ==
Relph was born in Chelsea, London on 13 April 1940. His father, Michael Relph was a Ealing Studios writer and producer and his mother, Doris, née Ringwood was a costume designer. He attended Bembridge School before being educated at Bryanston School. After graduating from King's College, Cambridge, where he read engineering, he became an actor like his grandfather George Relph.

By 1961, he had become an assistant director for the television show Ghost Squad, leading to other assistant director roles, such as Doctor in Distress, Sunday Bloody Sunday and Macbeth. On 14 December 1963 he married Amanda Jane Grinling, an actress, and they had two children together.

In May 1979, Relph, Anne Skinner and Zelda Barron established Skreba Films, creating The Return of the Soldier. In 1981, he created a second independent production company, Greenpoint Films, creating The Ploughman's Lunch and Wetherby, the latter being Relph's favourite film he produced.

Relph became the first chief executive of British Screen Finance, backing fifty seven films during the five years he was in charge, going back to creating independent films. In 1997, Skreba and Greenpoint joined two other companies to make The Film Consortium, a large project backed by British government.

The chairman of the BAFTA Foundation Trustees, Relph was a member of the jury at the 41st Berlin International Film Festival. He also served on the Board of Governors of the British Film Institute.

He was appointed Commander of the Order of the British Empire (CBE) in the 2004 New Year Honours for services to the British film industry.

He died on 30 October 2016 of pneumonia as a result of complications after minor surgery at Royal United Hospital in Bath.

== Selected filmography ==
- Reds (1981)
- The Return of the Soldier (1982)
- The Ploughman's Lunch (1983)
- Wetherby (1985)
- Comrades (1986)
- Enchanted April (1991)
- The Secret Rapture (1993)
- Blue Juice (1995)
- Slab Boys (1997)
- The Land Girls (1998)
- Hideous Kinky (1998)
