= Jessie Furze =

English composer and pianist

Jessie Lillian Furze (4 February 1903 – 5 November 1984) was an English composer and pianist. She was born in Wallington, Surrey, and studied at the Royal Academy of Music where she won the Cuthbert Nunn prize for composition. After completing her studies she worked as a music teacher. She married Willem L.F. Nijhof and died in Croydon.

== Works ==
Furze composed over 250 works, mostly didactic music. She also published songbooks with collections of songs. Selected compositions include:

- I had a dove (Text: John Keats)
- Robin Redbreast
- The Drummer Boy
- Cheerful Sparrows
- Falling Leaves
- The Broken Doll published by The Associated Board of the Royal Schools of Music in 1926.
- Molly-O
- Grandmother's Story
- The Truants
- All Alone: Two's Company
- Farwell Mari
- Merrymakers published by The Associated Board of the Royal Schools of Music in 1927.
