= The Wizard of Baghdad =

1960 film by George Sherman

- Directed by: George Sherman
- Screenplay by: Jesse Lasky Jr. Pat Silver
- Based on: story by Samuel Newman
- Produced by: Sam Katzman
- Starring: Dick Shawn; Diane Baker; Barry Coe
- Cinematography: Ellis W. Carter
- Edited by: Saul A. Goodkind
- Music by: Irving Gertz
- Distributed by: 20th Century Fox
- Release date: December 1960 (United States)
- Running time: 92 minutes
- Country: United States
- Language: English
- Budget: $575,000.

The Wizard of Baghdad is a 1960 American comedy/fantasy film directed by George Sherman and starring Dick Shawn, Diane Baker, and Barry Coe. It was released by 20th Century Fox.

== Plot ==
A genie turned mortal after his many failures is sent to Baghdad. As his last chance to prove himself, he must help a prince and princess fulfill a prophecy.

== Cast ==
- Dick Shawn as Genii-Ali Mahmud
- Diane Baker as Princess Yasmin
- Barry Coe as Prince Husan
- John Van Dreelen as Sultan Jullnar
- Robert F. Simon as Shamadin
- Vaughn Taylor as Norodeen
- Michael David as Chieftain Meroki
- Stanley Adams as Warden Kvetch
- Kim Hamilton as Teegra
- William Edmonson as Asmodeus
- Fred Scheiwiller as 1st Wrestler
- Stan Molek as 2nd Wrestler

== Production ==
The Wizard of Baghdad was the first film made by Sam Katzman's Clover Productions at 20th Century Fox. He opened offices at Fox in June 1960. (Katzman had spent the past 15 years working almost exclusively for Columbia). The script was written by Jesse Lasy Jr and his wife pat Silver based on an original by Sam Newman Katzman had worked as a set dresser at Fox in the 1920s.

It was the second movie for Dick Shawn, best known as a stage actor. Filming took place in August 1960.

Barry Coe's performance led to Robert Goldstein of Fox signing the actor to a long-term contract with the studio. The movie was part of Goldstein's short tenure while head of Fox, other movies being made including North to Alaska, The Marriage-Go-Round, Sanctuary, The Schnook, Circle of Deception, The Mark, The Millionairess, Esther and the King, The Big Gamble Return to Peyton Place and Flaming Star.

== Reception ==
The Los Angeles Times said the film "should fill the bill as pre Christmas entertainment for the children" through "the funny lines, the slapstick and the trick photography."

The New York Times said the film "is for customers who will laugh at anything, including that singular unfunny man, Dick Shawn... the waste of energy, costumes and backgrounds is truly appalling."

== See also ==
- List of American films of 1961
