= Heather McNair =

American actress

- Education: Arizona State University
- Occupation: Actress
- Years active: 1983 – 1993

Heather McNair is an American actress who acted in Hollywood between 1983 and 1993.

McNair grew up in Phoenix and attended Arizona State University, where she was a cheerleader. She planned to be a teacher, but after she began modeling while in college, she changed to that career, working in New York and Japan. A call from her agent prompted her to venture into acting. The result was a part in the television series Automan.

She starred in the TV series Automan in the role of Roxanne Caldwell, and also appeared in, among others, the series St. Elsewhere, Knight Rider and Airwolf, and in the films Madhouse, Kid and Chaplin.
