= List of The New York Times number-one books of 1945 =

This is a list of books that topped The New York Times best-seller list in 1945.

== Fiction ==
The following list ranks the number-one best-selling fiction books. Eight books topped the list that year, the longest on top being The Green Years, which dominated the winter months (18 weeks including 1 week in 1944). Other particularly popular titles included A Lion is in the Streets (10 weeks on top) and The Black Rose (17 weeks including 4 in 1946).

Date	Book	Author
January 7	The Green Years	A.J. Cronin
January 14	The Green Years	A.J. Cronin
January 21	The Green Years	A.J. Cronin
January 28	The Green Years	A.J. Cronin
February 4	The Green Years	A.J. Cronin
February 11	The Green Years	A.J. Cronin
February 18	The Green Years	A.J. Cronin
February 25	The Green Years	A.J. Cronin
March 4	The Green Years	A.J. Cronin
March 11	The Green Years	A.J. Cronin
March 18	The Green Years	A.J. Cronin
March 25	The Green Years	A.J. Cronin
April 1	The Green Years	A.J. Cronin
April 8	The Green Years	A.J. Cronin
April 15	The Green Years	A.J. Cronin
April 22	Earth and High Heaven	Gwethalyn Graham
April 29	The Ballad and the Source	Rosamond Lehmann
May 6	The Ballad and the Source	Rosamond Lehmann
May 13	The Ballad and the Source	Rosamond Lehmann
May 20	The Green Years	A.J. Cronin
May 27	The Green Years	A.J. Cronin
June 3	Forever Amber	Kathleen Winsor
June 10	Captain from Castile	Samuel Shellabarger
June 17	The Ballad and the Source	Rosamond Lehmann
June 24	Captain from Castile	Samuel Shellabarger
July 1	Captain from Castile	Samuel Shellabarger
July 8	A Lion is in the Streets	Adria Locke Langley
July 15	A Lion is in the Streets	Adria Locke Langley
July 22	Captain from Castile	Samuel Shellabarger
July 29	A Lion is in the Streets	Adria Locke Langley
August 5	A Lion is in the Streets	Adria Locke Langley
August 12	A Lion is in the Streets	Adria Locke Langley
August 19	A Lion is in the Streets	Adria Locke Langley
August 26	A Lion is in the Streets	Adria Locke Langley
September 2	A Lion is in the Streets	Adria Locke Langley
September 9	A Lion is in the Streets	Adria Locke Langley
September 16	A Lion is in the Streets	Adria Locke Langley
September 23	So Well Remembered	James Hilton
September 30	So Well Remembered	James Hilton
October 7	The Black Rose	Thomas B. Costain
October 14	The Black Rose	Thomas B. Costain
October 21	The Black Rose	Thomas B. Costain
October 28	The Black Rose	Thomas B. Costain
November 4	The Black Rose	Thomas B. Costain
November 11	The Black Rose	Thomas B. Costain
November 18	The Black Rose	Thomas B. Costain
November 25	The Black Rose	Thomas B. Costain
December 2	The Black Rose	Thomas B. Costain
December 9	The Black Rose	Thomas B. Costain
December 16	The Black Rose	Thomas B. Costain
December 23	The Black Rose	Thomas B. Costain
December 30	The Black Rose	Thomas B. Costain

== Nonfiction ==
The following list ranks the number-one best-selling nonfiction books.

Date	Book	Author
January 7	Brave Men	Ernie Pyle
January 14	Brave Men	Ernie Pyle
January 21	Brave Men	Ernie Pyle
January 28	The Time for Decision	Sumner Welles
February 4	The Time for Decision	Sumner Welles
February 11	Brave Men	Ernie Pyle
February 18	Brave Men	Ernie Pyle
February 25	Brave Men	Ernie Pyle
March 4	Brave Men	Ernie Pyle
March 11	Anything Can Happen	George and Helen Papashvily
March 18	Anything Can Happen	George and Helen Papashvily
March 25	Anything Can Happen	George and Helen Papashvily
April 1	The Thurber Carnival	James Thurber
April 8	Black Boy	Richard Wright
April 15	Anything Can Happen	George and Helen Papashvily
April 22	Black Boy	Richard Wright
April 29	Black Boy	Richard Wright
May 6	Black Boy	Richard Wright
May 13	Brave Men	Ernie Pyle
May 20	Brave Men	Ernie Pyle
May 27	Brave Men	Ernie Pyle
June 3	Brave Men	Ernie Pyle
June 10	Black Boy	Richard Wright
June 17	Brave Men	Ernie Pyle
June 24	Brave Men	Ernie Pyle
July 1	Black Boy	Richard Wright
July 8	Up Front	Bill Mauldin
July 15	Up Front	Bill Mauldin
July 22	Up Front	Bill Mauldin
July 29	Up Front	Bill Mauldin
August 5	Up Front	Bill Mauldin
August 12	Up Front	Bill Mauldin
August 19	Up Front	Bill Mauldin
August 26	Up Front	Bill Mauldin
September 2	Up Front	Bill Mauldin
September 9	Up Front	Bill Mauldin
September 16	Up Front	Bill Mauldin
September 23	Up Front	Bill Mauldin
September 30	Up Front	Bill Mauldin
October 7	Up Front	Bill Mauldin
October 14	Up Front	Bill Mauldin
October 21	Up Front	Bill Mauldin
October 28	Up Front	Bill Mauldin
November 4	Up Front	Bill Mauldin
November 11	Up Front	Bill Mauldin
November 18	Up Front	Bill Mauldin
November 25	Up Front	Bill Mauldin
December 2	Up Front	Bill Mauldin
December 9	Up Front	Bill Mauldin
December 16	Up Front	Bill Mauldin
December 23	Up Front	Bill Mauldin
December 30	The Egg and I	Betty MacDonald

== See also ==
- Publishers Weekly list of bestselling novels in the United States in the 1940s
