= Prince of Foxes (film) =

1949 film by Henry King

- Directed by: Henry King
- Written by: Milton Krims
- Based on: Prince of Foxes; 1947 novel by Samuel Shellabarger
- Produced by: Sol C. Siegel
- Starring: Tyrone Power; Orson Welles
- Cinematography: Leon Shamroy
- Edited by: Barbara McLean
- Music by: Alfred Newman
- Distributed by: 20th Century Fox
- Release date: December 23, 1949
- Running time: 107 minutes
- Country: United States
- Language: English
- Box office: $2,550,000 (US rentals)

Prince of Foxes is a 1949 American historical adventure film adapted from Samuel Shellabarger's novel Prince of Foxes. The movie starred Tyrone Power as Orsini and Orson Welles as Cesare Borgia. It was nominated for two Oscars during the 22nd Academy Awards: Best Black and White Cinematography (Leon Shamroy) and Best Costume Design, Black and White (Vittorio Nino Novarese).

== Plot ==
In August 1500, Andrea Orsini, an artistic minor nobleman who is equally skilled with the brush, the sword, words, and women, serves the Machiavellian Prince Cesare Borgia as a soldier. Pleased with Andrea's ability to "follow my mind and keep his eyes fixed on the ultimate goal", Borgia selects Andrea to accomplish an intrigue: arrange the marriage of his widowed sister, Lucrezia (whose husband he has just had assassinated for the purpose), to Alfonso d'Este, the son of the Duke Ercole d'Este of Ferrara. By doing so, Borgia will remove Ferrara as an impediment to conquest of central Italy. In being selected, however, Andrea earns the enmity of Don Esteban Ramirez, an ambitious mercenary captain and rival.

Andrea travels to Venice to sell some of his paintings to raise money for expenses. He meets the lovely Camilla di Baglione, young wife of the elderly Count Marc Antonio Varano of Citta del Monte, and smitten with her, gallantly gives her a painting he was haggling to sell for a hundred ducats. Soon after, an assassin attempts to kill Andrea, but he thwarts the attack and spares the assassin to learn who hired him: the Duke Ercole d'Este. He hires the assassin, Mario Belli, as part of his own entourage.

Resuming the mission, Andrea stops to visit the farm of a blacksmith's widow, reputed to be hiding gold stolen by her bandit son. She is actually his mother, and he is in fact Andrea Zoppo, not the noble Orsini he pretends to be. The reunion is a rocky one, because the mother does not approve of her son's evil ways. Belli spies on them through a window. Andrea continues to Ferrara, where he succeeds in arranging the marriage by intimidating the duke and flattering Alfonso.

Andrea's next mission, again chosen over Don Esteban, is as ambassador to Citta del Monte, with orders to help Borgia conquer the mountaintop city by spring, using a romantic conquest of Camilla to facilitate a "correct" elimination of the elderly count. Borgia secretly hires Belli to spy on Andrea and report if his loyalty wavers. Andrea learns that when the old count has a problem to solve, he climbs to a high precipice looking out over the landscape. Belli is delighted because it would make it easy to kill the count, but Andrea is moved by the older man's wisdom and love for his people. Camilla, despite her suspicions of Andrea, grows to admire his artistic soul as he paints her portrait.

When Borgia, through Don Esteban, orders the count to allow passage of his army and to supply troops for it, the count defies him with the support of his people. Andrea changes sides to join his cause but Belli, a self-professed "born traitor", gives notice to Andrea and returns to Borgia. The count reveals to Andrea that he married Camilla only to protect her after her father died, and has treated her as his own daughter. He is mortally wounded in an ambush and rout of the vanguard of Borgia's army and Andrea takes up the defense.

After three months of repelling assaults, the city is at its last extremity. Don Esteban offers Camilla terms that are generous to her and her people, but would require her to surrender Andrea to Borgia. In love with Andrea, she rejects the terms, but Andrea gives himself up to Don Esteban at the price of putting the terms in writing. At a triumphal dinner with Camilla, who has begged him to spare Andrea's life, Borgia hauls in Andrea, tortured by Don Esteban, and exposes "the noble Orsini" as a peasant. He brings Andrea's mother to confirm it. Borgia orders his death by starvation but Belli, now a lieutenant in Borgia's service, protests and demands to gouge out Andrea's eyes in front of everyone and make him a blind beggar.

However, Belli has secretly remained loyal to Andrea and fakes the disfigurement, and Mother Zoppo takes her son home. After Borgia moves on to another campaign, Andrea and Belli plot to free the imprisoned Camilla and help the people retake their city. Belli aids Andrea in entering the castle to rescue Camilla, but the signal for the citizen uprising is given before they can make their escape. Andrea kills Don Esteban in single combat, but is about to be killed by another officer after Andrea stumbles over Esteban's corpse. However, Balgioni, an officer, weary of killing for Borgia and an admirer of Andrea's, recognizes and spares him. The uprising sparks widespread resistance to Borgia, and after his fall, Andrea and Camilla are married.

== Cast ==
- Tyrone Power as Andrea Orsini
- Orson Welles as Cesare Borgia
- Wanda Hendrix as Camilla Varano
- Marina Berti as Angela Borgia
- Everett Sloane as Mario Belli
- Katina Paxinou as Mona Constanza Zoppo
- Felix Aylmer as Count Marc Antonio Varano
- Leslie Bradley as Don Esteban (uncredited)

== Production ==
The novel was published in 1947. It became a best seller.

In February 1948 the film rights were bought by 20th Century Fox for a reported $200,000. They intended it to be a vehicle for Tyrone Power. It was thought the novel would involve censorship challenges because Pope Alexander VI was a major character.

Sol Siegel was assigned the job of producing, Henry King was to direct and Milton Krims to write the script. Censorship issues were resolved by removing the character of Alexander VI so the Borgias had no father. As long as the script didn't mention religion or the church, the Catholic Church indicated that they would not protest. King left for Italy in April 1948 and the others followed in June. Orson Welles signed in July. Zanuck said at the time finance for the film came from "frozen" funds in Italy, but the studio had to provide an extra $1.5 million.

Most of the scenes were shot on the exact locations in Italy and San Marino, with all the studio work done at Cinecittà Studios.

- Chapel of the Palazzo Pubblico, Siena
- Siena
- Tuscany
- Rome
- Lazio
- Florence
- San Gimignano
- San Marino
- Terracina
- Latina
- Venice
- Veneto

"It was worth every dollar it cost and it cost plenty", said Zanuck of location filming.

== Reception ==
Bosley Crowther in his December 24, 1949, review for The New York Times, praised the film's “stately magnificence, so far as settings and costumes are concerned, and of unbounded generosity in bringing the Italian Renaissance to popular view … one vivid sequence representing an assault on a hill town by the armies of Cesare Borgia, done with horrendous graphicness, and a brief but beautiful duel on a real palazzo's stairway at the end.”—all “superbly photographed,” but missing “the believable breath of life and the sense of momentum and excitement that a story of the Renaissance should have”. “Except for the last fifteen minutes … it is a peculiarly prolix and static succession of beautiful scenes, full of inflated conversation, in which dramatic action rarely shows… Henry King has directed … performances that have the grand manner but little vitality. Tyrone Power as the bold adventurer swashes as much as he can, but the tempo and mood of the picture perceptibly hold him down. Everett Sloane, too, does his darndest to get in some broad licks now and then as a renegade and assassin… both …may definitely be counted as assets …Wanda Hendrix.. is much too juvenile and sallow... Orson Welles' eager performance of Cesare Borgia, whom they called "The Bull," is remarkably appropriate to that distinctive soubriquet...and Katina Paxinou does nicely in two scenes as Mr. Powers' old ma. Possibly Technicolor, which is strangely lacking, might have helped to shield the dramatic shortcomings of this picture. But what it really needed was a stronger script.“

The Santa Cruz Sentinel published an Associated Press capsule review by Bob Thomas on December 13, 1949: “ “Prince of Foxes" is above-average swashbuckling stuff. Beautifully filmed in authentic Italian backgrounds, it has enough highlights to offset the dull moments of florid dialogue. Tyrone Power is properly dashing, and Orson Welles and Wanda Hendrix support. Good escapist entertainment."

It was nominated for two Oscars during the 22nd Academy Awards: Best Black and White Cinematography (Leon Shamroy) and Best Costume Design, Black and White (Vittorio Nino Novarese). It lost the Cinematography award to Battleground (Paul C. Bogel) and lost the Costume Design award to The Heiress (Edith Head and Gile Steele).
