= A Note in Music =

Book by Rosamond Lehmann

- First edition (UK)
- Author: Rosamond Lehmann
- Language: English
- Publisher: Chatto & Windus (UK); Henry Holt (US)
- Publication date: 1930
- Publication place: United Kingdom
- Media type: Print

A Note in Music is Rosamond Lehmann's second novel. The novel was published to less acclaim than Lehmann's first novel, Dusty Answer. The novel is semi-autobiographical, as it is based on the marriage between Lehmann and Wogan Phillips, a painter.
