= The Weather in the Streets (film) =

British television film

- DVD cover
- Genre: Romantic drama
- Based on: The Weather in the Streets by Rosamond Lehmann
- Written by: Julian Mitchell
- Directed by: Gavin Millar
- Starring: Michael York; Lisa Eichhorn; Joanna Lumley
- Music by: Carl Davis
- Country of origin: United Kingdom
- Original language: English

Production
- Executive producer: David Nicholas Wilkinson
- Producer: Alan Shallcross
- Cinematography: John Hooper
- Editor: Angus Newton
- Running time: 133 minutes
- Production company: Britannia TV

Original release
- Release: 30 November 1983 (BFI)
- Network: BBC Two
- Release: 12 February 1984

The Weather in the Streets is a 1983 British romantic drama television film directed by Gavin Millar, written by Julian Mitchell, and starring Michael York, Lisa Eichhorn and Joanna Lumley. Adapted from the 1936 novel of the same title by Rosamond Lehmann, it originally premiered at the London Film Festival on 30 November 1983, before being broadcast on BBC Two on 12 February 1984.

== Cast ==
- Michael York as Rollo Spencer
- Lisa Eichhorn as Olivia Curtis
- Joanna Lumley as Kate
- Rosalind Ayres as Etty
- Faith Brook as Lady Spencer
- Isabel Dean as Mrs. Curtis
- Sebastian Shaw as Mr. Curtis
- Marcus Gilbert as Kurt
- Charles Grant as Adrian
- Max Hafler as Colin
- Janet Henfrey as Lady Blanche
- Merelina Kendall as Anna
- John Quarmby as Mr. Treadeven
- Rosie Marcel as Jane
- Jane Myerson as Lady Mary
- Emily Nye as Polly
- Robin Parkinson as Doctor
- Norman Pitt as Sir John
- Holly De Jong as Marigold
- Eileen Helsby as Woman in the inn
- Charles Pemberton as Train steward
- Ian Fairbairn as David Cooke
- Keith Robinson as Footman
- James Walker as Ivor
- Alistair White as Christopher
- Terry Pearson as Partygoer

== Bibliography ==
- Goble, Alan. The Complete Index to Literary Sources in Film. Walter de Gruyter, 1999.
