= Tamar Herzig =

Israeli historian

Tamar Herzig (Hebrew: תמר הרציג; born 1975) is an Israeli historian of Early Modern Europe who specializes in religious, social, minorities, and gender history, with a focus on Renaissance Italy. She is the Konrad Adenauer Professor of Comparative European History at Tel Aviv University and since 2021 also serves as the Vice Dean for Research of the Faculty of Humanities.

== Academic career ==
Herzig was trained at the Hebrew University in Jerusalem. She received her BA in history and philosophy. Her MA in history focused on witchcraft and gender in Renaissance Italy. In 2000-2001 she was one of the first two Israeli George L. Mosse Fellows at the University of Wisconsin-Madison. Her PhD was directed by Moshe Sluhovsky [he] and the late Michael Heyd [he]. The dissertation focused on the role of visionary and prophetic women in the reform movement inspired by Girolamo Savonarola in late fifteenth-century and early sixteenth-century Italy. She pursued her postdoctoral research (funded by Yad Hanadiv Foundation) at the Department of Religious Studies at the University of Pennsylvania.

In 2007 Herzig was appointed Senior Lecturer at the Department of History in Tel Aviv University, and since 2019 she is full Professor. In 2008-2009 she was Andrew W. Mellon Fellow at the Huntington Library in California. In 2012, she was elected as a member of the opening group of the Young Academy of Israel (founded by the Israeli Academy of Sciences and Humanities). In 2013 she was awarded a Jean-François Malle one-year fellowship at Villa I Tatti, the Harvard University Center for Italian Renaissance Studies in Florence. In 2014-2021 she served as director of Tel Aviv University’s Morris E. Curiel Institute for European Studies. She was the Renaissance Society of America's Discipline Representative for the field of Religion for two terms and has been member of the advisory board of Renaissance Quarterly. She is a member of the editorial board of the journals Mediterranean Historical Review, of Magic, Ritual, and Witchcraft, of the book series I Tatti Studies in Italian Renaissance History, and of the academic board of the Medici Archive Project. Herzig is also the Vice Chairperson of the Historical Society of Israel.

== Research fields ==
Herzig's main Interests are the religious and gender aspects of early modern European life. She wrote extensively on the Italian Renaissance, the Roman Inquisition, Catholic reform movements, heresy, monastic life, religious conversion, witchcraft, mysticism, and the history of sexuality. Her current work deals with female Jewish slavery in early modern Italy.

Visionary and prophetic women in the Savonarolan Reform movement were the topic of Herzig’s first book (2008), which is based on her doctoral thesis, and was published in English and Italian. The book focuses on the religious groups that flourished outside of Florence during the Italian Wars and were inspired by Savonarola’s religious ideology. Herzig argues that visionary and prophetic women came to fill key roles as the spiritual leaders of these reformist groups. In spite of Savonarola’s earlier critique of women’s ecstatic visions, his male disciples in northern Italy allied with reform-minded women who were reputed for sanctity and who shared their commitment to Savonarola’s religious legacy. Herzig's book explores the unique conditions that enabled saintly Dominican tertiaries such as Colomba da Rieti, Lucia Brocadelli da Narni, and Caterina da Racconigi to become leading figures in the Savonarolan movement In the decades following Savonarola’s execution in 1498. The research traces how the role that women played in the spread of Savonarola’s ideology and the initial formation of his cult was erased from the histories of the Savonarolan movement after the Council of Trent and the rise of new ideals of female religiosity.

In her second book “Christ Transformed into a Virgin Woman” (2013), Herzig investigates the fascination expressed by Alsatian Dominican witch-hunter Heinrich Kramer (Institoris), a highly misogynistic inquisitor, for the somatic spirituality of Lucia Brocadelli da Narni and several other Italian ‘living saints’. Her reconstruction of Kramer’s life in this book is based on a close reading of some of his lesser-known writings, notably the Sancte Romane ecclesie fidei defensionis clippeum adversus Waldensium seu Pikardorum heresim (A Shield to Defend the Holy Roman Church against the Heresy of the Pikards or Waldensians, from 1501), and on new archival findings regarding his ties with Dominican inquisitors and female mystics in northern Italy. The book reveals the connection between the characterization of diabolic witchcraft as a feminine practice and the spread of the fame of sanctity of pious Italian women mystics to other parts of Europe. A connection which manifested on the eve of the Reformation in the relation between works such as Kramer’s notorious demonological work, the ‘Malleus Maleficarum’ (Hammer of Witches) and the presence of pious women mystics who were renowned for the physical manifestations of their holiness. Herzig argues that the connection was closely related to severe concerns regarding dissenting religious groups led by heterodox male thinkers, such as the Hussite sub-sects that proliferated in Bohemia and Moravia in the fifteenth and sixteenth centuries, as well as to the growing fear of the rival religions, namely Judaism and Islam.

Herzig's most recent book “A Convert's Tale” (2019) analyzes the complex dynamics of Jewish apostasy in northern Italy during the High Renaissance. “A Convert's Tale” is a Microhistoric study of the life of Salomone da Sesso/Ercole de’ Fedeli, one of the most famous Jewish artists of the Italian Renaissance, who in 1491 was compelled to accept baptism. The book offers a social history of conversion based on a vast array of archival documents that reconstruct the events leading to the conversion of an entire Jewish family. Then, the book follows the repercussions that conversion entailed for the various members of the family, tracing the changing circumstances of the family for three more decades after the theatrical staging of their baptism in Ferrara’s cathedral. The book explores questions of religious identity, the policing of sexuality, social mobility, and their interplay with artistic patronage, aesthetic creativity, and the material culture that became a hallmark of Italian courts during the High Renaissance.

Herzig's latest publication unpacked a 1610 case of a multiple perpetrator rape of enslaved female Jews in Livorno. The article argues that the assault was a part of a business strategy of high ranking state officials. The rape of female slaves by other enslaved men was used as a means of increasing the slavers’ profits by pressuring the affluent Jewish community in Livorno to pay increasing rates for the redemption of captive Jewish women. Following the publication the case received attention in multipole countries' media outlets.

== Publications ==
=== Books ===
- Savonarola's Women: Visions and Reform in Renaissance Italy. Chicago: The University of Chicago Press, 2008.
- Le donne di Savonarola: Spiritualità e devozione nell’ Italia del Rinascimento. Rome: Carocci Editore, 2014.
- ‘Christ Transformed into a Virgin Woman’: Lucia Brocadelli, Heinrich Institoris, and the Defense of the Faith. Rome: Edizioni di Storia e Letteratura, 2013.
- A Convert's Tale: Art, Crime and Jewish Apostasy in Renaissance Italy. Cambridge: Harvard University Press, 2019.
- ההומניזם ותרבות הרנסאנס באיטליה כרך ג' בסדרה "על סף העת החדשה: אירופה 1350-1660" (רעננה: האוניברסיטה הפתוחה, 2014).

=== Edited books ===
- Dissimulation and Deceit in Early Modern Europe [co-edited with Miriam Eliav-Feldon]. Houndmills: Palgrave Macmillan, 2015.
- Knowledge and Religion in Early Modern Europe: Studies in Honor of Michael Heyd [co-edited with Asaph Ben-Tov and Yaacov Deutsch]. Leiden: Brill, 2013.
- Ebraismo e cristianesimo in Italia tra ’400 e ’600: Confronti e convergenze [co-edited with Luca Baraldi and Gabriella Zarri]. Special issue of Archivio Italiano per la Storia della Pietà 25 (2012).

== Prizes ==
- In July 2022 her article “Slavery and Interethnic Sexual Violence: A Multiple Perpetrator Rape in Seveneeenth-Century Livorno” was announced article of the month of The Mediterranean Seminar.
- In 2021 Herzig was awarded the Israel Institute for Advanced Studies’ Michael Bruno Memorial Award for Groundbreaking Research for her work on Renaissance Italy and its contribution to the study of premodern history.
- In 2021, she was awarded Honorable Mention by the Renaissance Society of America’s Phyllis Goodhart Gordan Book Prize in Renaissance Studies for “A Convert’s Tale”.
- In 2020, Herzig won the American Historical Association's Dorothy Rosenberg Book Prize for the best book on the history of the Jewish Diaspora for “A Convert’s Tale”.
- In 2019, Herzig won the Kadar Award for Outstanding Research for her work on religious conversion in early modern Italy.
- Elected member of the Opening Group of the Young Academy of Israel, founded by the Israeli Academy of Sciences and Humanities (2012-16).
