= Lucy Brocadelli =

Dominican tertiary and stigmatic

Blessed Lucy of Narni TOSD
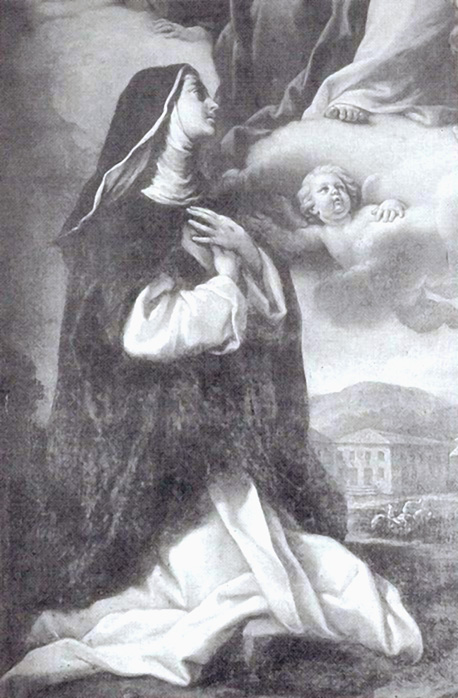
- Blessed Lucy Brocadelli depicted in a fresco in her burial chapel in the Cathedral of San Giovenale in Narni
- Born: 13 December 1476; Narni, Umbria, Papal States
- Died: November 15, 1544 (aged 67); Ferrara, Duchy of Ferrara
- Venerated in: Roman Catholic Church
- Beatified: 1 March 1710 by Pope Clement XI
- Major shrine: Cathedral of Narni, Italy
- Feast: 16 November (since 1962)

Lucy Brocadelli, also known as Lucy of Narni or Lucy of Narnia (13 December 1476 – 15 November 1544), was a Dominican tertiary who was a mystic and a stigmatic. She has been venerated by the Roman Catholic Church since 1710. She is known for being the counselor of the Duke of Ferrara, for founding convents in two different and distant city-states and for her remains being returned to her home city of Narni on 26 May 1935, 391 years after her death.

== Early life ==
Lucy Brocadelly was born on 13 December 1476 on the feast day of Lucy of Syracuse, the eldest of eleven children of Bartolomeo Brocadelli and Gentilina Cassio, in the town of Narni (then called Narnia) and in the region of Umbria. A pious child, she is said to have received visions from an early age. When she was twelve years old, Lucy made a private vow of chastity, and she determined to become a Dominican nun.

Circumstances, however, changed to make doing so impossible as her father died the following year, leaving her in the care of an uncle. This uncle, following the wish of her father while he was still alive, decided that the best course of action he could take would be to get Lucy married as quickly as possible. He made several attempts to do so. One of these included holding a large family party. He had invited the man he had chosen to become Lucy's husband to the party, with the intention of having the couple publicly betrothed. He however had not informed Lucy of his intentions. The suitor made an attempt to put a ring on Lucy's finger, only to be slapped repeatedly by her for his efforts.

A later attempt involved Count Pietro di Alessio of Milan, an acquaintance of the family. Lucy was actually quite fond of him but felt that her earlier vow of perpetual virginity made the marriage impossible. The strain Lucy felt as a result of the conflicting feelings made her seriously ill. During this time, the Virgin Mary and Saint Dominic reportedly appeared to her, this time accompanied by Saint Catherine of Siena. They reportedly advised Lucy to contract a legal marriage to Pietro, but to explain that her vow of virginity would have to be respected and not violated. Pietro agreed to the terms, and the marriage was formalized.

== Marriage ==
In 1491, Lucy became Pietro's legal wife and the mistress of his household, which included a number of servants and a busy social calendar. Despite her busy social schedule as a Countess, Lucy made great efforts to instruct the servants in the Catholic faith and soon became well known locally for her charity to the poor. Pietro observed Lucy's behavior, and occasional quirks, quite indulgently. He never objected when she gave away clothing and food. Nor when she performed austere penances, which included regularly wearing a hair shirt under her garments and spending most of the night in prayer and helping the poor. He also seemed to have taken in stride the story he was told by the servants that Lucy was often visited in the evenings by Ss. Catherine, Agnes of Rome, and Agnes of Montepulciano, who helped her make bread for the poor.

However, when one of the servants came up to him one day and told him that Lucy was privately entertaining a handsome young man she appeared to be quite familiar with, he did react. He took up his sword and went to see who this person was. When he arrived, he found Lucy contemplating a large crucifix. The servant told him that the man he had seen Lucy with looked like the figure on the crucifix.

Later, Lucy left one night for a local Franciscan friary, only to find it closed. She returned home the following morning, stating that she had been led back by two saints. That was enough for Pietro. He had her locked away for the bulk of one Lenten season. She was visited only by servants who brought her food. When Easter arrived, however, she managed to escape from Pietro back to her mother's house and, on 8 May 1494, became a Dominican tertiary. Pietro expressed his disapproval of this in a rather dramatic form—by burning down the monastery of the prior who had given her the habit of the Order.

== Stigmata ==
In 1495, Lucy went to Rome and joined a group of Dominican tertiaries who were living in community. The next year she was sent to Viterbo to establish a new convent and there she found she was frequently the object of unwanted attention. It was there, on 25 February 1496, that she is reported to have received the stigmata. Lucy did her best to hide these marks, and was frequently in spiritual ecstasy. The house had a steady stream of visitors who came to speak to Lucy, and, often, just to stare at her. Even the other sisters were concerned about her, and at one point called in the local bishop who watched Lucy go through the drama of the Passion for twelve hours straight.

The bishop would not make a decision on Lucy and called in the local inquisition. Reports here vary, some indicating that he referred the case directly to the pope, who is said to have spoken with her and, with the assistance of Columba of Rieti (another mystic of the Third Order of Saint Dominic), ultimately decided in her favor, telling her to go home and pray for him. At that time Pietro also came to her, making a final plea to persuade Lucy to return with him as his wife. She declined, and Pietro left alone. He would himself later become a Franciscan friar and a famous preacher.

When Lucy returned to the convent in Viterbo, she found that the Duke of Ferrara, Ercole d'Este I, had determined to build a convent in Ferrara, a city about 230 miles north, and that, having heard of her, he determined that she would be its prioress. In the summer of 1497 he invited her to be the founder of this new community. Lucy, the Dominican Order, and the pope all agreed quickly to the new proposal. The municipal council of Viterbo, however, objected, not wanting to lose their celebrated mystic. She had already been praying for some time for a way to create a new community of stricter observance, however, and agreed to go to the new convent.

== Conflict ==
Lucy's decision precipitated a conflict between Ferrara and Viterbo which would continue for two years. Viterbo wanted to keep the famous mystic for themselves, and the Duke wanted her in Ferrara. After extensive correspondence between the parties, on April 15, 1499, Lucy escaped secretly from Viterbo and was officially received in Ferrara on May 7, 1499. Thirteen young girls immediately applied for admission to the new convent; the construction of the convent began in June and was completed two years later, in August 1501. It contained 140 cells for sisters and the novices, but to fill it with suitable vocations proved to be very difficult.

Lucy expressed the wish to have there some of her former friends from Viterbo and Narni. Duke Ercole, in September 1501, sent his messenger to Rome asking for the help of the pope's daughter, Lucrezia Borgia, who was preparing to marry the Duke's son, Alfonso. She collected all eleven candidates whom Lucy had indicated and sent them as a special wedding present to Lucy and the Duke, a few days ahead of her bridal party. She herself solemnly entered Ferrara on 2 February 1502.

The Duke petitioned the local bishop for some help for Lucy in governing her new community, and the bishop sent ten women from a local monastery to join Lucia's convent. For better or worse, these were nuns of the Dominican Second order, who were thus permitted to wear black veils, something Lucy and the other sisters of the Third Order were not. The differences in canonical standing and requirements between the two groups was to cause friction in the convent.

Tensions were heightened when one of these, Maria da Parma, was made the prioress of the convent on September 2, 1503. When Duke Ercole died on 24 January 1505, the new prioress quickly found Lucy to be guilty of some unrecorded transgression (most probably of her open and public support for the Savonarolan church reform), and placed her on a strict penance. Lucy was not allowed to speak to any person but her confessor, who was chosen by the prioress. The local Dominican prior provincial would also not permit any member of the order to see her. There are records that at least one sister, Catherine of Racconigi, did visit her and that Lucy's earlier visitations by departed saints continued. In response to Lucy's insistent prayer, her stigmata eventually disappeared, which caused some of the other members of the community to question whether they had ever been there at all. This punishment was to last her entire life, or at least until 1541, when a niece of Girolamo Savonarola was elected prioress.

== Death, veneration and beatification ==
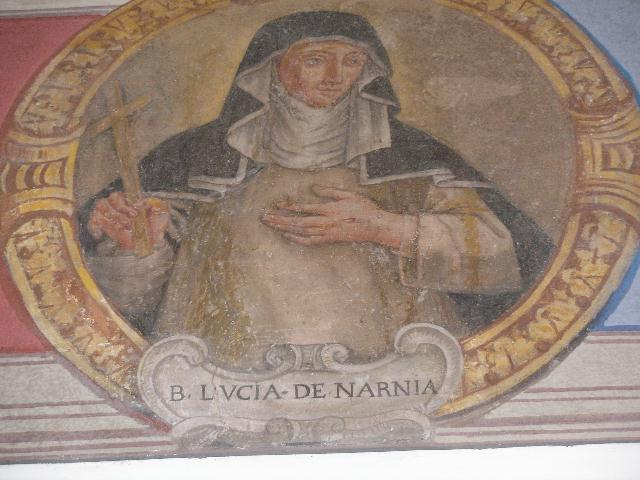
A fresco in Narni depicting Blessed Lucy

When Lucy died on November 15, 1544, many people were surprised to find that she had not died years earlier. When her body was laid out for burial, so many people wanted to pay their last respects that her funeral had to be delayed by three days. Her tomb in the convent church was opened four years later and her perfectly preserved body was transferred to a glass reliquary.

When the French Revolutionary Army suppressed the convent in 1797, her body was transferred to the Cathedral of Ferrara, and again, on 26 May 1935, to the Cathedral of Narni, as the diocese had been merged with another. Lucy was beatified by Pope Clement XI on 1 March 1710.

== In popular culture ==
Lucy has a very important part in Prince of Foxes by Samuel Shellabarger, a historical novel which dramatizes her escape from Viterbo.

She also was possibly a source of inspiration for Lucy Pevensie, one of the protagonists of The Chronicles of Narnia by C.S. Lewis. Lucy is the first character to discover the world of Narnia in an old wardrobe, and sticks to her story though her siblings at first disbelieve her. Walter Hooper, a biographer of Lewis, has referred to the possible connection.

== Bibliography ==
Georgiana Fullerton, Blessed Lucy of Narni. Part Two of The Life of St. Frances of Rome, of blessed Lucy of Narni, etc. New York 1855, 139–158. [20 p.]. 206 p.

Edmund G. Gardner, Dukes and Poets in Ferrara: A Study in the Poetry, Religion, and Politics of the Fifteenth and Early Sixteenth Centuries. New York 1968 (1904), pp. 364–423, 466. 578 p.

E. Ann Matter, Prophetic Patronage as Repression: Lucia Brocadelli da Narnia and Ercole d'Este. In Scott L. Waugh and Peter D. Diehl (ed.), Christendom and Its Discontents: Exclusion, Persecution, and Rebellion, 1000-1500. Cambridge 1996, 168–176. [9 p.] 376 p.

Lucia Brocadelli, Seven Revelations: The Book of Blessed Lucia of Narni written in her own hand in the year of Our Lord 1544. Introduced and Translated by E. Ann Matter. Published by Maiju Lemijoke-Gardner (ed.), in Dominican Penitent Women pp. 216–243. New York 2005, 316 p. ISBN 0-8091-0523-3

Tamar Herzig, Witches, Saints, and Heretics: Heinrich Kramer's Ties with Italian Women Mystics. In Magic, Ritual, and Witchcraft (journal), Summer 2006, 24-55 [32 p.] Herzig writes: "Lucia Brocadelli, also known as Lucia of Narni, [is] the most famous Italian living saint ('santa viva') of the early sixteenth century", p.31.

Antonio Samaritani, Lucia da Narni ed Ercole I d'Este a Ferrara tra Caterina da Siena, Girolamo Savonarola e i Piagnoni. Fonti e letteratura. Ferrara, Edizioni Cartografica 2006. 113 p. (30 cm) ISBN 88-88630-01-5

Tamar Herzig, Savonarola's Women: Visions and Reform in Renaissance Italy. The University of Chicago Press 2008, 320 p. ISBN 0-226-32915-1

Lucia da Narni, Vita della Beata Lucia da Narni domenicana copiata dall' Autografo della detta Beata (Autobiografia 1544). The manuscript recently discovered in Bologna and published by E. Ann Matter and Gabriella Zarri in Una mistica contestata : la Vita di Lucia da Narni (1476-1544) tra agiografia e autobiografia (pp.1-255). Roma, 2011. LVI, 262 p. ISBN 978-88-637-2269-7 ISBN 8863722692
