= Invitation to the Waltz =

Invitation to the Waltz may refer to:

- Invitation to the Waltz (film), a 1935 British film
- Invitation to the Waltz (novel), a 1932 novel by Rosamond Lehmann
- Invitation to the Dance (Weber), sometimes mistranslated Invitation to the Waltz, an 1819 piano piece by Carl Maria von Weber
