= Vern Oakley =

American film director

Vern Oakley is a television and film director based in New Jersey. He is also the founder of Tribe Pictures. Oakley received top honors at the International Film and Television Festival for his direction of the Emmy Award-winning children's television series Reading Rainbow. His work as an editor on the documentary The Chemical People for PBS garnered him an Emmy nomination. His first theatrical release feature, A Modern Affair, starring Stanley Tucci and Lisa Eichhorn, was invited to multiple festivals. It showed on HBO and was distributed by Columbia TriStar, which he produced and directed. His feature Paraty, a USA-Brazil co-production is in the preproduction stage.

He lives in Chatham, NJ with his wife Mary-Jo Salerno and two children. His brother Bill Oakley was executive producer and writer on several series of The Simpsons.
