= Tribe Pictures =

American film company

- Industry: Film production
- Founded: 1986
- Headquarters: Chatham, New Jersey, U.S.
- Website: http://www.tribepictures.com

Tribe Pictures is a film production company headquartered in Chatham Borough, New Jersey. They produced A Modern Affair, a 1996 independent feature film, directed by Vern Oakley, CEO of Tribe.

== Productions ==
- A Modern Affair
- Symphony: Stanley Black & Decker
- Twice As: Actavis
- The Greatness Before Us: Agnes Scott College
