= The Weather in the Streets =

1936 novel by Rosamond Lehmann

- First edition
- Author: Rosamond Lehmann
- Published: 1936
- Publisher: William Collins, Sons
- Pages: 416 pp.
- OCLC: 287951

The Weather in the Streets is a novel by Rosamond Lehmann which was first published in 1936. When it was published it was an instant best-seller, selling particularly well in France.

== Content ==
The story involves the description of Olivia Curtis, a young woman, and her affair with a married man, Rollo Spencer, whom she knows through his sister Marigold and whom she meets again on a railway journey (after having met him, initially, years before at a ball). Eventually Rollo Spencer's wife, Nicola, becomes pregnant which leads to the termination of the affair with Olivia.

The heroine of the novel, Olivia, is an older version of the same character who is the central character in Lehmann's novel Invitation to the Waltz. In the earlier work she moves from childhood to young adulthood, while in The Weather in the Streets she is an adult who has been married at an earlier stage of her life and is now separated (in contrast to her sister Kate who is happily married). The novel was controversial in some ways, for example in its depiction of extramarital affairs on the one hand and of backstreet abortions on the other (at a time, prior to the Abortion Act 1967, when abortion was still illegal). Lehmann observed that the character Olivia was quite autobiographical (more so, for example, than Judith Earle in her debut novel, Dusty Answer).

Stylistically, the novel uses techniques and forms that were pioneered by modernist writers such as Virginia Woolf and James Joyce, with a fragmented narrative style building up a complex interiority that helps us to explore subjects that were relatively taboo during the 1930s such as female sexuality. Lehmann also employs the device of sharp shifts between first and third person narration which helps to manifest the complex emotional life experienced by Olivia and the way in which it interacts with the wider culture of the period.

== Film adaptation ==
A British film of the same name was produced in 1983. It was directed by Don Homfray and Gavin Millar and starred Michael York, Lisa Eichhorn, and Joanna Lumley. It premiered at the London Film Festival in November 1983, before being broadcast on the BBC the following February.

== In other media ==
Marilyn Monroe is reading the book in the "Marilyn Monroe and Billy Wilder" episode of the television show Urban Myths.

Diana Carey-Lewis is reading the novel in the 1936 chapter of the novel Coming Home, by Rosamunde Pilcher.
