= A Modern Affair =

- Directed by: Vern Oakley
- Written by: Paul Zimmerman
- Story by: Vern Oakley; Paul Zimmerman
- Produced by: Vern Oakley; Melanie Webber; Jennifer Wilkinson
- Starring: Lisa Eichhorn; Stanley Tucci; Caroline Aaron
- Cinematography: Rex Nicholson
- Edited by: Suzanne Pillsbury
- Music by: Jan Hammer
- Release date: September 1, 1995 (Boston Film Festival)
- Running time: 90 minutes
- Country: United States
- Language: English

A Modern Affair is a 1996 independent feature film directed by Vern Oakley and produced by Tribe Pictures.

Starring Stanley Tucci and Lisa Eichhorn, the film's plot reverses the conventions of romantic comedies. Instead of a man meeting a woman, falling in love, marrying, and having a baby, the woman gets pregnant, meets the child's father, and falls in love.

Winner of the Long Island Festival Audience Award, A Modern Affair played theatrically, was broadcast by HBO and distributed by Columbia TriStar Home Video.

== Plot ==
Grace Rhodes (Lisa Eichhorn) is a lonely, successful executive whose biological clock is loudly ticking. Giving up on finding the right man, she resorts to using a sperm bank on the advice of her best friend Elaine (Caroline Aaron). Soon she is pregnant, but she becomes so curious as to the identity of the father that she goes on a quest to find him with the help of Elaine. Peter Kessler (Stanley Tucci) is a nature photographer living in Upstate New York. While his lifestyle differs from hers, he is also reluctant to commit to a relationship, indulging in a casual affair with a married woman (Mary Jo Salerno). His photographs only feature landscapes because, as far as he is concerned, "people mess up composition."

His world is rocked when Grace comes into the picture. And announces she's pregnant. "You got yourself into this situation," he tells her. "You're going to have to get yourself out. I'm not going to take responsibility for your baby." While at first, he runs away from any intimacy, he renews contact with Grace later. From then on begins their discovery of mutual commitment and their journey to parenthood.

== Themes ==
A Modern Affair purports to investigate the meaning of bringing a child to the world rather than tackling the artificial insemination and sperm bank, which serve as a ploy to explore intimacy and commitment. Coincidentally, since the film was made, the identity of sperm donors has been offered more readily to children conceived by anonymous donors.
