= The King's Cavalier =

1950 novel by Samuel Shellabarger

- Author: Samuel Shellabarger
- Language: English
- Genre: Historical adventure
- Publisher: Little, Brown and Company
- Publication date: 1950
- Publication place: United States
- Media type: Print

The King's Cavalier is a 1950, historical adventure novel by the American writer Samuel Shellabarger. It takes place in Renaissance France during the reign of Francis I. It peaked at the third place on the bestselling fiction list in America.

== Bibliography ==
- Beetz, Kirk H. Beacham's Encyclopedia of Popular Fiction, Volume 3. Beacham Publishing, 1996.
- Burt, Daniel S. The Chronology of American Literature: America's Literary Achievements from the Colonial Era to Modern Times. Houghton Mifflin Harcourt, 2004.
- McParland, Robert. Bestseller: A Century of America's Favorite Books. Rowman & Littlefield, 2018.
