= Nan Green =

British communist and Spanish Civil War volunteer (1904–1984)

Nan Green (19 November 1904 - 6 April 1984), was a British communist who volunteered in October 1936 to join her husband George on the Republican side in the Spanish Civil War. She worked in several hospitals as a medical administrator and collator of statistics. After the war, she continued to support veterans of the International Brigade.

== Spanish Civil War ==
Born Nancy Farrow in Beeston, Nottingham, she came from what one biographer characterized as "a shabby-genteel background". In November 1929, she married George Green, a musician. That same year she joined the Independent Labour Party (ILP). In the early 1930s, she joined the Communist Party of Great Britain (CPGB). In October 1936, after the start of the Spanish Civil War, she volunteered to help the Republican faction. She chose to do hospital work in Spain, where her husband George was already serving as an ambulance driver. The Green's two children remained behind in Britain; their places at Summerhill School were paid for by fellow volunteer, Wogan Philipps.

Nan Green went to the "English hospital" at Huete, and was also posted to hospitals at Valdeganga, Uclés, and the Santa Llúcia "cave hospital" near the Ebro. As an administrator and secretary to Dr. Len Crome, she did valuable organisational work, notably in medical statistics. Her experiences, including forthright criticism of the conditions and food, and being a blood donor in the early days of transfusion, are described in a memoir published posthumously in 2004. Her commitment to the Republican cause continued after her husband George's death at the Battle of Ebro on 23 September 1938.

== Aftermath ==
Following the victory of Francisco Franco's Nationalist faction in 1939, she accompanied Spanish Republicans escaping by ship from France to Mexico, and became a leading figure in the National Joint Committee for Spanish Relief and the International Brigade Association. During and after the Second World War, she was active in humanitarian and left-wing causes, among them the World Peace Movement. Her short-lived second marriage to communist journalist Ted Brake ended in 1960. She managed to visit and write about the women's prison in Madrid, and survived to see Franco's death in 1975, and the end of his dictatorship.

Nan Green died on 6 April 1984. Her ashes were taken to Spain and scattered on the soil where her first husband George had his unknown grave.
