= Laurence Philipps, 1st Baron Milford =

Laurence Richard Philipps, 1st Baron Milford (24 January 1874 – 7 December 1962), was a British peer. He was a founder and chairman of the shipping company Court Line.

Philipps was the sixth son of Reverend Sir James Erasmus Philipps, 12th Baronet of Picton, and his wife, Mary Margaret (née Best). John Philipps, 1st Viscount St Davids, and Owen Philipps, 1st Baron Kylsant, were his elder brothers.

== Public life ==
In Hampshire in 1910 he became a justice of the peace and for 1915 was high sheriff. In 1918, he became a Justice of the Peace for Radnorshire. Philipps was Governor of the University College of Wales and Founder of the Paraplegic Hospital in Wales.

He was created a Baronet, of Llanstephan in the County of Radnor, in 1919 and in 1939 he was raised to the peerage as Baron Milford, of Llanstephan in the County of Radnor. The barony was a revival of the two extinct baronies of Milford, created in 1776 and in 1847, held by earlier members of the Philipps family.

In 1919 he offered a prize of £1,000 for the British airman to fly the Atlantic, this was awarded to John Alcock following his Transatlatic Flight.

== Horse racing ==
As a racehorse owner and stud owner, Philipps was a member of the Jockey Club, he also founded Tote Investors which was later acquired by the Horse Race Totalisator Board and then nationalised in 1939 as The Tote.

== Family life ==
Lord Milford married Ethel Georgina, daughter of Reverend Benjamin Speke, in 1901. He died in December 1962, aged 88, and was succeeded in his titles by his eldest son Wogan. In his later years, he had political friction with Wogan, who was a member of the Communist Party of Great Britain. Lady Milford died in 1971.

== Arms ==
Coat of arms of Laurence Philipps, 1st Baron Milford
Crest A lion as in the arms. Escutcheon Argent a lion rampant Sable ducally gorged and chained Or. Supporters On either side a horse Argent charged on the shoulder with three bars wavy Azure. Motto Ducit Amor Patriæ (Patriotism My Motive)

== Sources ==
- Kidd, Charles, Williamson, David (editors). Debrett's Peerage and Baronetage (1990 edition). New York: St Martin's Press, 1990,
- Leigh Rayment's Peerage Pages
- "Philipps, Laurence Richard, 1st. Baron Milford and 1st baronet," Welsh Biography Online

Peerage of the United Kingdom
New creation	Baron Milford; 1939–1962	Succeeded by Wogan Philipps
Baronetage of the United Kingdom
New creation	Baronet (of Llanstephen); 1919–1962	Succeeded by Wogan Philipps
