= Invitation to the Waltz (novel) =

1932 novel by Rosamond Lehmann

Invitation to the Waltz is a novel by Rosamond Lehmann, first published in 1932 by Chatto & Windus Ltd. The prequel to Lehmann's The Weather in the Streets (1936), the novel follows the preparations of two sisters, Kate and Olivia Curtis, for Sir John and Lady Spencer's dance. BBC Radio recorded and broadcast in 2001 a dramatization by Tina Pepler as Olivia's stream of consciousness.

== Plot introduction ==
The novel is divided into three parts: the first part deals with Olivia Curtis's birthday. The novel opens on the seventeenth birthday of the central character Olivia Curtis. She receives gifts like a diary, a China ornament, a ten-shilling note and a roll of silk. The second part takes place during the week that divides Olivia's birthday and the waltz she is invited to. Olivia is preparing for her first dance, something complicated by her age and expectations (as the demands of womanhood fight with her girlhood). Unlike her sisters, Olivia feels uncomfortable and believes she is going to bungle her first performance. The final part focuses on the dance and how it leads to the development of different characters.

== Characters ==
Olivia Curtis

Kate Curtis

Mrs Curtis

Etty

Rollo Spencer

Marigold Spencer

Nicola Maude

Lady Spencer

Sir John
