= Captain from Castile (novel) =

1945 historical novel by Samuel Shellabarger

- First edition
- Author: Samuel Shellabarger
- Language: English
- Genre: Historical fiction
- Publisher: Little, Brown
- Publication date: 1945
- Publication place: United States
- Media type: Print
- Pages: 503

Captain from Castile is a historical adventure novel by author Samuel Shellabarger originally published in 1945.

The novel relates the adventures of young Spanish nobleman Pedro de Vargas during the early years of the 16th century, focusing mainly on his mistreatment by the Spanish Inquisition, his adventures in Mexico while serving as a captain during Hernan Cortés' conquest of the Aztecs, and his subsequent return to Spain.

== Plot ==
Captain from Castile begins on the evening of June 28, 1518 when naïve 19-year-old Pedro de Vargas, the son of local war hero Don Francisco de Vargas, confesses a long list of minor sins to the local priest in Jaen, Spain. The next day, while attending church with his family, Pedro becomes infatuated with the local Marquis' daughter, Luisa de Carvajal.

As Pedro and his family leave church they are met by Diego de Silva, who enlists the help of Pedro in the search for his escaped Indian slave, Coatl. Pedro immediately guesses Coatl's location and sets off alone to find and capture him, but instead is convinced to aid the badly mistreated slave—who claims he is a king among his own people—in his escape.

Pedro then comes across and rescues the local tavern dancer, Catana Pérez, from being raped by several rough men and returns her to the Rosario tavern. There he stops for a drink and befriends Juan García, an adventurous merchant and wanted man, whose mother has been wrongfully taken by the Inquisition. Pedro agrees to deliver García's bribe for his mother's freedom to Father Ignacio de Lora, the head of the Jaen Inquisition, though he does not believe men of God can be bought.

However, when Pedro delivers the money he is surprised to find that Father Ignacio accepts the bribe and agrees to free García's mother. The next night Pedro has a romantic rendezvous with Luisa de Carvajal and when returning home is stopped by Catana's brother Manuel, who informs him that the Inquisition has taken his family and is hunting him. Pedro flees to the Marquis de Carvajal for help, but finds no help from the cowardly nobleman and so flees to the Rosario tavern where Catana begins plans to help him escape from Spain. However, Pedro is discovered and arrested there by the Inquisition.

The next morning Pedro is taken back to Jaen, where he witnesses the auto-da-fé at which, despite the bribe, Ignacio de Lora sentences García's mother to death by burning and also sees García (in disguise) manage to kill her before the sentence is carried out. Pedro soon learns that the family has been arrested because of accusations by Coatl's former master, Diego de Silva, who coveted the de Vargas property and whose men Pedro had beaten in defense of Catana's integrity. In an effort to get a confession from Don Francisco, the Inquisition tortures Pedro's sickly sister Mercedes and accidentally kills her.

Afterwards Pedro and his family are rescued from their cells by García and Manuel Pérez. During the escape Pedro is confronted by de Silva, whom he disarms, stabs, and leaves for dead. Afterward the family makes their way through the Sierra de Lucena toward Almería guided by Hernán Soler, a cutthroat to whom Catana sells herself in payment for his help. However, during their passage through the mountains, Pedro and García are separated from the others when they are attacked by the Inquisition's hunters. While Pedro's family escapes to Italy, Pedro and García travel to Cádiz and from there join an expedition to Cuba, where they join the company of Hernán Cortés departing for Mexico.

During their stay along the coast of Mexico, the Aztec king Montezuma sends Cortés a tribute of great gold ornaments and, because of his growing favour with Cortés, Pedro is entrusted with one of the guard shifts. However, during his watch, Pedro is called away to help calm down García, who is in a drunken madness. When Pedro returns to the gold, he finds a small pouch of emeralds has been stolen by way of a secret door. Pedro therefore sets out in search of the stolen stones and tracks them to a group of mutineers preparing a ship for escape back to Cuba. Pedro convinces one of them to repent and help him alert the army, but during their escape Pedro is wounded in the head and leg by a crossbow.

During Pedro's recovery he receives a promotion to captain (making him the eponymous "Captain from Castile"), learns of Cortés burning his ships to prevent mutiny, and is reunited with Catana Pérez, who arrives aboard another ship.

Soon afterwards, the Spanish head inland towards Tenochtitlan, the capital of the Aztec Empire. Along the way Pedro and Catana fall deeply in love with each other. During their stay in Tenochtitlan, Cortés' company is joined by a new group including both Father Ignacio de Lora and Diego de Silva, who had survived his encounter with Pedro. The Spanish are treated like gods but eventually the Aztecs begin to rebel against the Spanish occupation and the Spanish are besieged within the city. During their desperate escape attempt, Pedro, Catana, and García almost escape but are left to die by de Silva.

While awaiting execution by the Aztecs, Pedro witnesses the death of Ignacio de Lora by burning and the miscarriage of his and Catana's first child. However, instead of being executed, Pedro, Catana, and García are taken out into the jungle by the Aztecs and transferred to the custody of another tribe ruled by Coatl, the slave Pedro helped to save.

After spending several months living among Coatl's people, Pedro becomes eager to return to Cortés. Coatl, as a parting gift, shows Pedro a cave filled with gold treasures which Pedro barters with Cortés to split between themselves, their friends, and the King of Spain. Cortés, now serving as governor of Mexico, has had a son with the native woman who accompanied the conquest of Mexico as his translator, Doña Marina. Pedro returns to Spain rich and world-wise with the King's share and acts as ambassador of Cortés. Upon his return he spurns the (as he now realizes) ambition-serving love of Luisa de Carvajal and is again confronted by Diego de Silva but this time turns the authorities against the greedy nobleman and in the end kills de Silva in a fight.

Thereafter the de Vargas family is pardoned and returns to Spain, where Pedro and Catana receive Don Francisco's blessing to be married. The story concludes with the old Don Francisco reflecting on the bright new age his son is entering into, where courage, honor, and love will blossom in the New World just as it had in the Old.

== Film adaptation ==
The first half of the book was made into a successful film, Captain from Castile, in 1947.
