= Lisa Eichhorn =

American actress, writer, producer (born 1952)

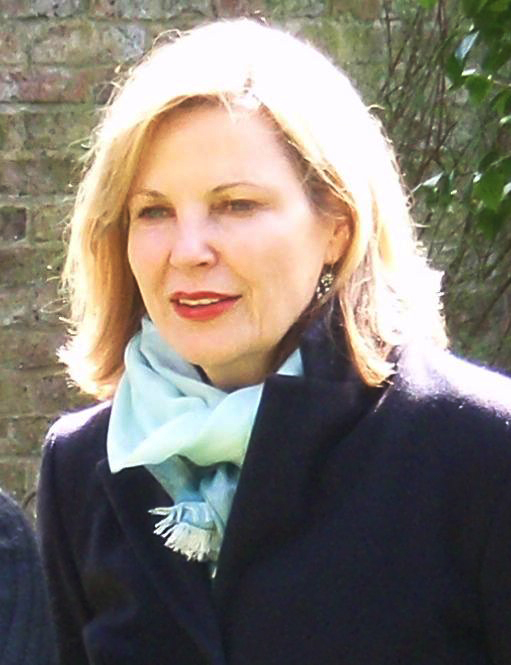
- Lisa Eichhorn in 2010
- Born: February 4, 1952 (age 74); Glens Falls, New York, U.S.
- Occupations: Actress, writer, producer
- Years active: 1977–present
- Spouse: Richard Moxon (2005-present)

Lisa Eichhorn (born February 4, 1952) is an American actress, writer and producer. She made her film debut in 1979 in the John Schlesinger film Yanks, for which she received two Golden Globe nominations. Her international career has included film, theatre and television.

== Early life ==
Lisa Eichhorn was born in Glens Falls, New York on February 4, 1952, to Frank and Dorothy Eichhorn. Her father worked in public relations for Western Electric, and she has two brothers and two sisters. Shortly thereafter she moved to Westbury, Long Island, with her older brother and two half-sisters. In 1958, the family moved to Reading, Pennsylvania, where Eichhorn later attended Mt. Penn High School.

Eichhorn began college at Queen's University at Kingston, Ontario, taking a wide range of subjects. She quickly realized that her passion was drama and English, and these subjects became her focus. She left Ontario after two years to study at St. Peter's College, Oxford, on a year-long Rotary International Ambassadorial Scholarship, though this was not as an admitted member of the university in statu pupillari.

== Career ==
=== Early career ===
Upon graduating from RADA in 1977, Eichhorn immediately began rehearsals for the Queen's Theatre, Hornchurch, playing Ophelia in Hamlet. This was followed by a wide range of regional work, including Stop the World - I Want to Get Off for the Queen's Theatre, Rosalind in As You Like It at the Bolton Octagon, The Wings of the Dove for the BBC, and The Fatal Weakness opposite Elaine Stritch at the Theatre Royal, Windsor.

In December 1977, Eichhorn met with John Schlesinger for the role of Lancashire shop-girl Jean Moreton in his wartime romance, Yanks. She convinced him she was British and he gave her a screen test and, subsequently, the part. Although Eichhorn then felt duty-bound to tell Schlesinger she was actually American, he insisted that she was his choice regardless of her nationality. Eichhorn won two Golden Globe nominations for her performance in Yanks: Best Actress and Best New Star.

The day after filming wrapped on Yanks, Eichhorn flew to Boston to play Gertrude Wentworth in Merchant-Ivory's The Europeans, for which she won a BAFTA nomination for Best Supporting Actress.

Eichhorn made a handful of London television appearances, then moved to Hollywood where she collaborated with actor Treat Williams on her first American film, Why Would I Lie? (originally titled The Fabricator). Around this time, Ivan Passer and Paul Gurian enlisted Eichhorn to play Maureen (Mo) Cutter in Cutter's Way (previously Cutter and Bone) with Jeff Bridges and John Heard. Eichhorn's performance as Alex Cutter's wistful, alcoholic wife was deemed "the most underrated performance of the decade" by the American Film Institute and earned her the Best Actress Award (American division) at the Deauville Film Festival.

In 1980, Eichhorn was cast opposite Gene Hackman in the low-budget Universal feature, All Night Long. Barbra Streisand's then-agent, Sue Mengers, wanted a bigger outing for her husband, director Jean-Claude Tramont, and persuaded him to replace Eichhorn with Streisand on the film: three weeks into principal photography Eichhorn was fired from the project.

In the summer, Eichhorn travelled to Poland to shoot the CBS/TimeLife venture The Wall for Harry Sherman. She moved to Connecticut for the birth of her daughter in 1981, then returned to L.A. to play Margaret in The Hasty Heart opposite Kurt Russell.

Eichhorn's film work at this time included Wildrose and Opposing Force in L.A. and East Lynne, with Martin Shaw, and The Weather in the Streets, with Michael York and Joanna Lumley, for the BBC in London.

In 1984, Eichhorn starred in Golden Boy at the Royal National Theatre, London. She made her New York theatre debut opposite Nathan Lane in The Common Pursuit in 1986, while playing Elizabeth Carlyle on All My Children for a year.

Eichhorn was invited to be a Life Member of the Actors Studio in 1988. She shot the film Moon 44 for Roland Emmerich in Germany, then began a fruitful association with the Royal Exchange Theatre in Manchester, England, in Alex Finlayson's award-winning Winding the Ball, under the direction of Greg Hersov.

=== 1990s ===
In 1990, Eichhorn made her Broadway debut at the Belasco Theatre in The Speed of Darkness, with Len Cariou, Stephen Lang and Robert Sean Leonard. She went on to star opposite Sada Thompson and Justin Kirk in Any Given Day at the Longacre Theatre, and in the film A Modern Affair opposite Stanley Tucci.

In 1996, Eichhorn returned to Los Angeles for her daughter's high school career. She starred in two more Hersov-Finlayson collaborations at the Royal Exchange Manchester: Tobaccoland and Misfits, in which she played Marilyn Monroe. She returned to New York in 2000 to do a variety of theatre, television and teaching.

=== 2000s ===
In 2003, Eichhorn moved back to London to pursue writing and producing. She returned to the Royal Exchange Manchester in 2004 to play Ouisa in Six Degrees of Separation, and played Joy Gresham opposite Julian Glover's C.S. Lewis in Shadowlands at Salisbury Playhouse.

In London, Eichhorn worked in theatre (Women of Lockerbie, Enduring Freedom) and television (Spooks, Midsomer Murders, Inspector Morse, Cracker).

In 2007, Eichhorn produced and co-wrote Defenders of Riga, which was the official Latvian film entry to the 2009 Academy Awards.

== Filmography ==
=== Film ===
Lisa Eichhorn television credits
Year	Title	Role	Notes
1979	The Europeans	Gertrude Wentworth	BAFTA Nomination for Best Supporting Actress
1979	Yanks	Jean Moreton	Golden Globe Nomination for Best Actress; Golden Globe Nomination for Best New Star
1980	Why Would I Lie?	Kay	
1981	Cutter's Way	Maureen 'Mo' Cutter	Best Actress Award (American Division), Deauville Film Festival
1984	Wildrose	June Lorich	
1986	Opposing Force	Lieutenant Catherine Casey	
1990	Moon 44	Terry Morgan	
1990	Grim Prairie Tales	Maureen	
1990	Nocturne	The Woman	
1993	The Vanishing	Helene Cousins	
1993	King of the Hill	Mrs. Kurlander	
1995	Lulu Askew	Lulu	Short
1995	A Modern Affair	Grace Rhodes	
1996	First Kid	Linda Davenport	
1996	Sticks and Stones	Book's Mom	
1998	Goodbye Lover	Mrs. Brodsky	
1998	Judas Kiss	Mary-Ellen Floyd	
1998	Angel Blue	Jill Cromwell	
1999	The Talented Mr. Ripley	Emily Greenleaf	
2000	Boys and Girls	Shuttle Passenger	
2000	Things Left Unsaid	Unknown	Short
2009	Stolen	Maggie	Short
2013	About Time	Mary's Mother, Jean	
2016	The Confessions	Mysterious woman	
2016	Offensive	Helen Martin	
2022	DEUS: The Dark Sphere	Mother	

=== Television ===
Lisa Eichhorn film credits
Year	Title	Role	Notes
1978	BBC Play of the Month	Milly Theale	TV play. Episode: "The Wings of the Dove" (Series 14: 4/8/1979)
1980	Roald Dahl's Tales of the Unexpected	Sally	Episode: "My Lady Love, My Dove"
1982	The Wall	Rachel Apt	TV movie
1982	East Lynne	Lady Isabel Vane	TV movie
1983	Feel the Heat	Honor Campbell	TV movie
1984	The Weather in the Streets	Olivia Curtis	TV movie
1986	Miami Vice	Danielle Hier	Episode: "French Twist"
1986	Blind Justice	Carolyn Shetland	TV movie
1986	Murder in Three Acts	Cynthia Dayton	TV movie
1986	All My Children	Elizabeth Carlyle	1 season
1988	The Equalizer	Mrs. Gephart	Episode: "Something Green"
1989	Saracen	Delphine Grant	Episode: "Into Africa"
1990	Frederick Forsyth Presents: Pride and Extreme Prejudice	Claudia	TV movie
1991	A Woman Named Jackie	Dr. Jordan	TV miniseries
1992	Swamp Thing	Victoria	Episode: "Love Lost"
1992	Devlin	Anita Brennan	TV movie
1992	Law & Order	Mary Kostrinski	Episode: "Point of View"
1993	Tribeca	Janie	Episode: "The Rainmaker"
1994	Law & Order	Arnette Fenady	Episode: "Nurture"
1995	Murder, She Wrote	Annette Rayburn	Episode: "Unwilling Witness"
1997	C-16: FBI	Catherine Hampton	TV pilot. 2 episodes
1997	The Practice	Mary Jane Wiggins	Episodes: "First Degree" & "Sex, Lies and Monkeys"
1997	Touched by an Angel	Beth	Episode: "My Dinner with Andrew"
1998	Law & Order	Arlene Galvin	Episode: "Scrambled"
1998	Diana: A Tribute to the People's Princess	Rachel	TV movie
1998	Chicago Hope	Helen Galloway	Episode: "The Breast and the Brightest"
1998	Inspector Morse	Dr. Millicent 'Millie' Van Buren	Episode: "The Wench is Dead"
1999	L.A. Doctors	Judith Atcheson	Episode: "Been There, Done That"
1999	Judging Amy	Mrs. Snowden	Episode: "The Persistence of Techtonics"
2001	Law & Order: Special Victims Unit	Peyton Kleberg	Episode: "Tangled"
2002	Strong Medicine	Madeline	Episode: "Trauma"
2002	Spooks	Mary Kane	Episode: "Thou Shalt Not Kill"
2002	Law & Order: Criminal Intent	Dr. Leonard	Episode: "Bright Boy"
2003	Law & Order	Retired M.E. Gail Berardi	Episode: "Suicide Box"
2005	Kenneth Tynan: In Praise of Hardcore	Mary McCarthy	TV movie
2005	Jericho	Mrs. Redford	TV miniseries. Episode: "The Killing of Johnny Swan"
2006	Cracker	Jean Molloy	Episode: "A New Terror"
2007	Midsomer Murders	Faith Alexander	Episode: "The Animal Within"

== Production credits ==
Film	Year	Role	Notes
Defenders of Riga	2008	Producer and co-writer	Latvia's official entry to the 2009 Academy Awards

== Awards and nominations ==
Year	Award	Category	Title of work	Result
1979	Golden Globe	Best Actress in a Motion Picture - Drama	Yanks	Nominated
1979	Golden Globe	New Star of the Year in a Motion Picture - Female	Yanks	Nominated
1980	BAFTA Film Award	Best Supporting Actress	The Europeans	Nominated
1982	National Society of Film Critics Award	Best Supporting Actress	Cutter's Way	Nominated
