= Dusty Answer =

1927 novel by Rosamond Lehmann

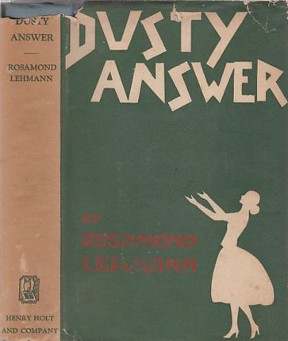
- First US edition
- Author: Rosamond Lehmann
- Language: English
- Genre: Bildungsroman
- Publisher: Chatto & Windus (UK); Henry Holt
- Publication date: 1927
- Publication place: United Kingdom
- Media type: print and audio
- Pages: 355 (UK), 348 (US)
- OCLC: 479619425

Dusty Answer is English author Rosamond Lehmann's first novel, published in 1927. She sent it unsolicited to publishers Chatto & Windus, which agreed to publish it, saying it showed "decided quality". It went unnoticed on initial publication but then received an effusive review by respected critic Alfred Noyes of The Sunday Times who called it "the sort of novel Keats would have written", which brought it to public attention and it became a bestseller, and according to The Guardian a "landmark book of the interwar period". Its success allowed her to leave her then husband and run off with maverick artist Wogan Philipps whom she later married.

== Plot introduction ==
The story contains many elements of the author's childhood, albeit idealised. Like the author, the protagonist, Judith Earle, grew up privately educated in a large riverbank house in Buckinghamshire, but unlike the author, Judith is an only child, with her only playmates being the five cousins next door: Julian, Charlie, Roddy, Martin and Mariella. Childhood friendships develop into romantic entanglements that continue as Judith leaves home for Girton College, Cambridge. Judith's brief romantic involvement with Jennifer, a fellow student, scandalized contemporary readers.

== Reception ==
With the exception of Alfred Noyes, most contemporary reviews concentrated on what was perceived as the author's unhealthy preoccupation with sex. In her memoir The Swan in the Evening, Lehmann states "It was discussed, and even reviewed, in certain quarters as the outpourings of a sex-maniac". The Evening Standard cited Dusty Answer and Alec Waugh's The Loom of Youth as being a "corrupting influence" on the young. The novel triggered a literary scandal and came to be regarded as an epitome of the Zeitgeist.

== Radio dramatisations ==
It has twice been dramatized for BBC Radio 4:

- In 1990 by Elspeth Sandys for The Monday Play
- In 2010 by Lavinia Greenlaw for Woman's Hour Drama, narrated by Julia Hills
