= Prince of Foxes =

1947 novel by Samuel Shellabarger

- First edition
- Author: Samuel Shellabarger
- Language: English
- Genre: Historical novel
- Publisher: Little, Brown
- Publication date: 1947
- Publication place: Boston, MA, USA
- Media type: Print (Hardcover)
- Pages: 433 (hardcover edition)
- ISBN: 0-316-78467-2 (hardcover edition)

Prince of Foxes is a 1947 historical novel by Samuel Shellabarger, following the adventures of the fictional Andrea Orsini, a captain in the service of Cesare Borgia during his conquest of the Romagna.

== Plot introduction ==
Andrea Zoppo, an Italian peasant schooled in the arts and versed in the ways of nobility during his University years, conceals his old identity during the French invasion of Florence, and becomes Andrea Orsini, a bastard member of a dead Neapolitan junior branch of the great house of Orsini. Having made his name with the French forces, he takes service with Cesare Borgia, with dreams of uniting Italy to stop the depredations of foreign adventurers and the manipulations of France and the Holy Roman Empire. However, his love of Lady Camilla of the Bagliones and respect for her husband Lord Varano of Citta del Monte derail those plans when he is sent to their court to take the city by treachery.

== Plot summary ==
The novel begins with Andrea on the verge of embarking from Venice on his first non-military mission for Borgia, to induce Alfonso d'Este, the heir of Ferrara, the "brightest court in Italy," to marry Lucrezia Borgia, lately widowed, despite the numerous objections against the match on the grounds of state and taste. Orsini meets with an instrument maker and humanist to sell a certain painting he claims was taken during the fall of one of the cities of the Romagne. There he meets Camilla Varano, the wife of the lord of the fictional Citta del Monte, both of which have been promised to him by Borgia. There is a definite attraction between the two.

The d'Estes, forced by Borgia to accept Andrea's service, do not wish to kill him in their demesne, and delegate the matter to their ambassador to Venice. He uses Mario Belli (Marius de Montbel, lately of Savoy), erstwhile nobleman, traitor, and assassin of some repute. Mario fails, but, a true "modern," turns his coat and offers information. Finding him intriguing and useful, Orsini spares him and offers him a place in his retinue. By force of his personality, Orsini overawes the d'Este ambassador and makes his way to Ferrara. On the journey, Belli secretly discovers Andrea's true heritage.

In Ferrara, despite the interference of Duke Ercole d'Este and his impetuous son Cardinal Ippolito d'Este, and the resistance of the cannon-happy Alfonso d'Este, he accomplishes his mission, securing Alfonso's promises. Meanwhile, Orsini makes an enemy of the cardinal, befriends Belli's enemy Pierre de Bayard, paints a monastery, and falls deeper in love with Camilla, a guest of the d'Estes.

Without knowledge of Andrea's success, the duke and cardinal send him to bring to Ferrara a living saint, Lucia Brocadelli of Narni, a woman whose stigmata are the talk of the region. Despite the Duke's earnest inducements and her willingness to go, the people of Viterbo will not release her. After a pleasant sojourn at the Citta del Monte, Orsini meets the saint, whose obvious piety deeply affects both him and Belli. In making his attempt to free her, Andrea is captured, but Belli succeeds, and Andrea talks his way out of the fracas.

In Rome, the pope grants his niece, Angela, lady in waiting to Lucrezia, a betrothal to her former lover, Orsini, and reveals his plot against the Varanos, who will come to Rome for the Jubilee. Cesare, thinking his father's actions precipitous, arrives in Rome to stop the arrest and the betrothal. Orsini attempts to detach himself from the favor of his former lover, and has himself knifed for his trouble. Belli, distrusting the sovereigns and potions of the medicos and dottores, tends to the wound himself. With his contacts in the underworld, Belli interrupts Angela's attempt to assassinate her rival for Andrea's affection, and, in an unnerving interview with Cesare, he secures Camilla's safety.

Borgia's conquest of the Marches had proceeded smoothly up to this point: his father, Pope Alexander VI, declared all his vicars in the region deposed and the citizens, largely seeing these rulers as cruel and petty, viewed Cesare Borgia as a great improvement when he eventually took power. In this way, Giovanni Sforza, first husband of Cesare's sister Lucrezia, was soon ousted from Pesaro; Pandolfo Malatesta lost Rimini and Faenza surrendered. But Borgia can only gain Citta del Monte through treachery, as low taxes and the love Varano's people bear him leave no obvious angles to stir up unrest, and Borgia cannot afford protracted warfare in the Marches. With Ferrara in alliance, he recalls his spy in Varano's court so that Orsini may take his place as captain of the guard, to suborn its people and assassinate its prince.

At Citta del Monte, Orsini falls further from Cesare's orbit, taking Varano as his new role model. Varano is a man of noble character and vast military experience, having in his youth made his fortune as a captain in the mercenary army of the prince of Urbino, serving the Papal interest. This wealth has allowed him to adorn his court without oppressing his domain. With a new understanding of leadership and foregoing his dreams of an Italy united under a single personality, Orsini sets about to strengthen Citta del Monte against Cesare. When the ultimatum finally arrives, Varano asks his people whether he should stay and bring his city the miseries of protracted siege, or take himself into exile. They overwhelmingly reject Borgia and acclaim him. The Varanos also reject Borgia's claim that Orsini is the impostor Zoppo, embarrassing him. Belli, according to their contract, informs Orsini that he will leave his service for Borgia's.

Despite a spirited defense of several months, Citta del Monte is left battered and bereft of its lord Varano, who dies of wounds incurred in the first attack. The walls breached beyond repair, the city prepares itself for its last defense, when Borgia, impatient, offers terms through his lieutenants. The terms are generous for a people so stubbornly set against him, but for one point: Zoppo must surrender himself. Despite Camilla's rejection of the terms, Orsini gives himself up in order to save her and the city.

Borgia keeps his terms, stripping the valuables from the court, but leaving the city under Camilla and one of his Catalan adventurers. However, to embarrass the young widow, he parades Orsini before her after having starved him for weeks, proves his Zoppo identity by means of his peasant mother, and plans his execution. Belli, now a favored lieutenant of Borgia, is outraged: after all the losses Orsini has inflicted on Borgia, is mere execution to suffice? He offers to gouge out his former master's eyes before Camilla, Borgia, and the assembled captains, and, given leave, does so.

Borgia, feigning pity, sends the blind peasant and his mother to wander the countryside, but sends Belli after them to "hurry them along." Belli catches up to them, whereupon Orsini reveals the trick to his mother: Belli simulated the gouging using grape innards and blood from his hands. They plot to recover Citta del Monte. Belli returns to Camilla for funding, warning her that Borgia has granted the new city prefect the chance to win her through whatever means he deems necessary, including the torture of her townsfolk. She is to pretend madness to discourage these plans.

Despite their careful plans, Orsini is recognized by Angela Borgia and the Cardinal d'Este while recruiting Swiss mercenaries and Pierre de Bayard. They reveal the plot to Borgia's captain, and spying on Orsini's interview with Camilla in the madhouse, discover how to stop the plot. Having suspected them, Orsini reveals that they have actually set the attack in motion. Bayard and the Swiss gain the walls as the city rises in revolt. Camilla gives the Catalan prefect to the people to avenge themselves upon, and Angela and d'Este are sent away.

Months later, the pope is dead and Cesare, ill and left without patronage, has been captured and exiled by his enemies. Orsini is acclaimed by all as the model man of the Renaissance, married to Camilla, whose (anonymous) paintings excite the envy of Mantegna himself.

== Characters in "Prince of Foxes" ==
- Andrea Orsini, né Andrea Zoppo, who has made himself into a man of parts, skilled in intrigue, politics, and human nature
- Mario Belli, an assassin, born Marius de Bella of Savoy, traitor to France, Andrea's ensign
- Cesare Borgia, duke of Valentinois, lord of the Romagna, captain of the Papal forces
- Lady Camilla Varano di Baglione
- Lord Varano of Citta del Monte
- Blessed Lucia Brocadelli of Narni, late of Viterbo, now of Ferrara

== Allusions/references to actual history and current science ==
- The conquest of the Romagna effected by Cesare Borgia is the backdrop for the events of the novel.
- Pierre Terrail, seigneur de Bayard, the subject of one of Shellabarger's scholarly works (The Chevalier Bayard: A Study in Fading Chivalry), makes several appearances.
- Andrea Mantegna makes a brief appearance.
- The novel dramatizes the mediation between Alfonse d'Este and the Borgias to bring about his marriage to Lucrezia
- The novel dramatizes how Ercole secured the Blessed Lucia of Narni from a jealous Viterbo
- The novel dramatizes the murder of Lucrezia's second husband, Alfonso of Aragon (Duke of Bisceglie)
- Zoppo is "cripple" in Italian. Blacksmiths in proto-Indo-European cultures were often crippled to prevent escape.

== Release details ==
- 1947, Boston, Little, Brown & Company ISBN 0-316-78467-2, Hardcover
- 1947, Toronto, McClelland and Company
- 1947, Armed Services Edition
- 1948, London, Hamish Hamilton
