= Columba of Rieti =

Italian religious sister of the Third Order of St. Dominic

Blessed Columba of Rieti TOSD
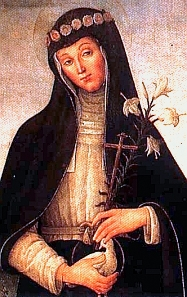

Virgin
- Born: 2 February 1467; Rieti, Umbria, Papal States
- Died: 20 May 1501 (aged 34); Perugia, Umbria, Papal States
- Venerated in: Roman Catholic Church (Dominican Order)
- Beatified: 25 February 1625 by Pope Urban VIII
- Feast: 20 May
- Attributes: Dominican tertiary receiving the Eucharist from a hand reaching down from heaven; Dominican tertiary with a dove, lily, and book, or a wreath of roses, cross, lily, and a rosary

Columba of Rieti (Italian: [ˈrjeːti]; 2 February 1467 – 20 May 1501) was an Italian religious sister of the Third Order of St. Dominic who was noted as a mystic. She was renowned for her spiritual counsel, devotion to the Blessed Sacrament, and fantastic miracles were attributed to her. She was beatified by the Catholic Church in 1625.

== Life ==
=== Early life ===
Columba was born Angelella Guardagnoli, the daughter of a poor family in the Umbrian city of Rieti. Legend states that when she was born, angels gathered around her house, singing, and that during her baptism, a dove flew down to the font. From then on, no one referred to her as Angelella, but as Columba (dove). As a small girl, Columba learned to spin and sew repairing the clothes of the local Dominican friars. She was educated by Dominican nuns. As a teenager, she prayed to discern her vocation in life and received a vision of Christ on a throne surrounded by saints. She took this as a sign to dedicate herself to God, and so she made a private vow of chastity, and spent her time in prayer. When it was revealed that her parents had arranged a marriage for her, she cut off her hair and sent it to her suitor as a way of letting him know where her real interest lay.

=== Religious life ===
Columba became a Dominican tertiary at age 19. She was reputedly given to ecstasies, during one of which her spirit toured the Holy Land. She was much sought after as a spiritual counselor. It is said that citizens from the city of Narni tried to kidnap her so she could be "their" miracle worker, but she escaped. The same townsfolk were later to fight to retain their own townswoman and mystic, Lucy of Narni.

Columba fasted regularly. Anorexia mirabilis was well known in Columba's time, when it was not seen as a medical emergency or mental illness, instead revered as a symbol of one's piety. Ultimately, the fasting caused her death in 1501, at the age of 34. Additionally, Columba was known to engage in acts designed to cause her physical pain, such as at the wearing of a hairshirt and sleeping on thorns. It's possible that she may have been influenced by Catherine of Siena, an earlier Italian Dominican saint, who practiced extreme fasting. Also, like Catherine, Columba cut her hair short to avoid marriage.

Upon an interior prompting that she should leave Rieti, Columba wandered away, having no concept of where she was going. Along the way she was arrested in Foligno as a vagrant. The bishop there ordered her to go to Perugia and to found a Third Order convent, which she did, but only against the strong objections of the citizens of Foligno and Rieti who wanted her for their own towns. She worked with the poor extensively in Perugia, so much so that her sanctity reportedly incensed Lucrezia Borgia for years. At one point Borgia had even issued a complaint accusing Columba of practicing magic. On the other hand, Pope Alexander VI, Lucrezia's father, held Columba in high regard. He consulted her and received a severe admonition to repent from her.

Columba spent eleven years as prioress in Perugia, dying on 20 May 1501, at the age of 34. Legend says that at the moment of her death, her friend and fellow Dominican tertiary, Osanna of Mantua, saw Columba's soul as a "radiance rising to heaven". The whole city turned out for her funeral, which was paid for by the city fathers. Columba was beatified on 25 February 1625 by Pope Urban VIII, and her feast day is celebrated within the Dominican Order on the anniversary of her death.

== Notes and references ==
Works cited

- Ashley, Benedict M, "Columba of Rieti", Blessed Osanna d'Andreasi and Other Renaissance Italian Dominican Women Mystics, archived from the original on March 20, 2008
- Jones, Terry, "Columba of Rieti", Patron Saints Index
- McNamara, Robert F (20 February 2007), "Bl. Columba of Rieti", Saints Alive, St. Thomas the Apostle Church, archived from the original on 10 December 2007

== See also ==
- Blessed Stephana de Quinzanis
- Blessed Osanna of Mantua
