= The Ballad and the Source =

1944 novel by Rosamond Lehmann

- 1945 US edition (publ. Reynal & Hitchcock)
- Author: Rosamond Lehmann
- Publisher: William Collins, Sons
- Publication date: 1944

The Ballad and the Source is a novel by Rosamond Lehmann, first published in 1944 by Collins in the UK. Set in Edwardian England, the book deals with the relationship between Rebecca, a young girl, and Sibyl Jardine, a complicated and domineering elderly woman.

Contemporary reviewers compared the novel to the work of Henry James, though the book's feminism was then considered unfashionable.

Lehmann returned to the character of Rebecca in her last novel, A Sea-Grape Tree (1976), which follows her as an adult dealing with betrayal by a married lover.
