= Rosamond Lehmann =

English writer (1901–1990)

Rosamond Lehmann CBE
- Born: Rosamond Nina Lehmann; 3 February 1901; Bourne End, Buckinghamshire, England
- Died: 12 March 1990 (aged 89); London, England
- Education: Girton College, Cambridge
- Occupation: Writer
- Spouses: Leslie Runciman (m. 1923; div. 1928) Wogan Philipps (m. 1928; div. 1944)
- Partner: Cecil Day-Lewis (1941–1950)
- Children: 2
- Parent: Rudolph Chambers Lehmann (father)
- Relatives: Beatrix Lehmann (sister); John Lehmann (brother); Owen Davis (cousin); Robert Chambers (great-grandfather); Rudolf Lehmann (great-uncle)
- Writing career
- Genre: Romance
- Notable work: Dusty Answer (1927)

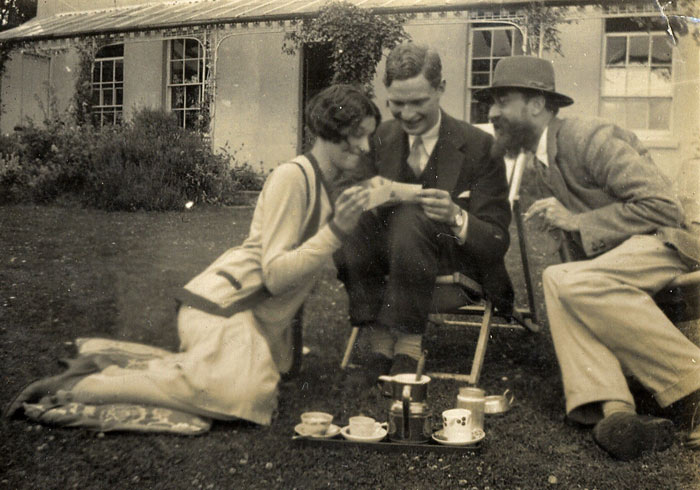
Lehmann in the 1920s with (L–R) her brother John and Lytton Strachey

Rosamond Nina Lehmann CBE (3 February 1901 – 12 March 1990) was an English novelist and translator. Her first novel, Dusty Answer (1927), was a succès de scandale; she subsequently became established in the literary world, and intimate with members of the Bloomsbury set. Her novel The Ballad and the Source received particular critical acclaim.

== Early life ==
Rosamond Lehmann was born in Bourne End, Buckinghamshire, the second of four children of Rudolph Chambers Lehmann (1856–1929) and his American wife, Alice Mary Davis (1873–1956), from New England. Rosamond's father was a Liberal MP from 1906 to 1910, and founder of Granta magazine and editor of the Daily News. Because of this, Rosamond grew up in an affluent, well-educated, and well-known family; the American playwright Owen Davis was Rosamond's cousin, and her great-grandfather Robert Chambers founded Chambers Dictionary. Her great-uncle was the artist Rudolf Lehmann.

Lehmann's older sister Helen was born in 1899, and her two younger siblings were born in 1903 and 1907 respectively. Her younger sister Beatrix (1903–1979) became an actress; her younger brother, John (1907–1987), a writer and publisher. Purportedly, Rosamond's father favoured Beatrix and her mother favoured John, leaving Rosamond feeling neglected. Because of this, supposedly, she turned to writing.

By 1911, Lehmann was being educated at home by the family's governess, Maria Jacquemin. Also in the home lived the family's eight servants. Rosamond's mother also instilled feminist ideals into her children.

In 1919, Lehmann won a scholarship to Girton College, Cambridge. She graduated with second-class degrees in both English Literature (1921) and Modern and Medieval Languages (1922). There, she also met her first husband, Leslie Runciman (later 2nd Viscount Runciman of Doxford). They married in December 1923, and the couple went to live in Newcastle upon Tyne. It was an unhappy marriage: "He [Runciman] panicked when [Lehmann] became pregnant and insisted on an abortion, after which he praised her for being once again "all clean and clear inside". The two separated in 1927 and were officially divorced later that year.

== Career ==
In 1927, Lehmann published her first novel, Dusty Answer, to great critical and popular acclaim. The novel's heroine, Judith, is attracted to both men and women, and interacts with fairly openly gay and lesbian characters during her years at Cambridge. The novel was considered a succès de scandale and is thought to be based on her Cambridge years.

Lehmann went on to publish six more novels, as well as a play (No More Music, 1939), a collection of short stories (The Gypsy's Baby & Other Stories, 1946), a spiritual autobiography (The Swan in the Evening, 1967), and a photographic memoir of her friends (Rosamond Lehmann's Album, 1985), many of whom were famous (Bloomsbury Group).

She also translated two French novels into English: Jacques Lemarchand's Genevieve (1948) and Jean Cocteau's 1929 novel Les Enfants Terribles as The Holy Terrors (1955).

Lehmann's novel The Weather in the Streets (1936) was made into a film of the same title The Weather in the Streets in 1983, which starred Michael York and Joanna Lumley.

Her 1953 novel The Echoing Grove was made into the 2002 film Heart of Me, starring Helena Bonham Carter as the main character, Dinah.

== Personal life and death ==
After Lehmann's divorce from Leslie Runciman, she married Wogan Philipps in 1928. Phillips was an artist who later succeeded his father as 2nd Baron Milford. Together they had two children: a son, Hugo (1929–1999), and a daughter, Sarah, also known as Sally (1934–1958). The family lived at Ipsden House in Oxfordshire between 1930 and 1939. While living in Oxfordshire, Lehmann began to mingle with prominent figures of the Bloomsbury Group, including Leonard and Virginia Woolf, though "Lehmann was unsure how to respond to the older woman's combination of teasing and flattery".

Lehmann's marriage with Phillips fell apart during the late 1930s, after Phillips left for Spain during the Spanish Civil War to support the anti-fascist cause. The separation, and Lehmann's affair with the journalist Goronwy Rees, led the two to divorce in 1944.

During the Second World War, Lehmann lived in the English countryside with her two children, and contributed to and helped to edit New Writing, a periodical edited by her brother John Lehmann. She was also an active opponent of fascism, and spoke at anti-fascist meetings in Paris and London, as well as being active in PEN International.

Lehmann's affair with Goronwy Rees began in 1936 and ended when she found out that Rees was engaged to another woman, by reading about the engagement in the newspaper. Afterward, Lehmann entered a "very public affair" for nine years (1941–1950) with the married poet Cecil Day-Lewis. The two went on holidays and lived together, and Lehmann tried to convince him to leave his wife for her. In the end, however, Day-Lewis left both his wife and Lehmann for actress Jill Balcon. This heartbreak inspired Lehmann's novel The Echoing Grove (1953), to great success.

Lehmann's beloved daughter, Sarah, died of poliomyelitis in 1958. Her death led Lehmann to retreat from the public world and turn to spiritualism. Lehmann believed that Sarah lived on after death. Her 1967 book The Swan in the Evening is an autobiography that Lehmann described as her "Last Testament". In it she intimately describes the emotions she felt at Sarah's birth, and also those she felt at her daughter's abrupt death. The memoir also recounts the psychic experiences Lehmann claims to have had in relation to Sarah's death, a theme she revisits in her 1986 anthology Moments of Truth, which is a collection of letters from "beyond the grave" purportedly dictated by Sarah. Some of these letters also appeared in an anthology of similar writings, The Awakening Letters, co-edited by Lehmann.

Lehmann was appointed a Commander of the Order of the British Empire (CBE) in the 1982 Birthday Honours.

Nearly blind from cataracts, Lehmann died at home in Clareville Grove, London, on 12 March 1990, aged 89.

== Works ==
- Dusty Answer (1927)
- A Note in Music (1930)
- Invitation to the Waltz (1932)
- The Weather in the Streets (1936)
- No More Music (1939)
- The Ballad and the Source (1944)
- Orion (as editor) (1945)
- The Gypsy's Baby & Other Stories (1946)
- The Echoing Grove (1953)
- The Swan in the Evening: Fragments of an Inner Life (1967; non-fiction)
- A Sea-Grape Tree (1976)
- The Awakening Letters (1978; ed. with Cynthia, Lady Sandys)
- Moments of Truth (1986; anthology, non-fiction)

== Biographies ==
- Selina Hastings, Rosamond Lehmann: A Life, 2002
- Diana E Lestourgeon, Rosamond Lehmann, 1965
- Marie-Jose Codaccioni, L'Oeuvre de Rosamond Lehmann: Sa contribution au roman féminin (1927–1952), 1983
- Judy Simons, Rosamond Lehmann, 1992
- Gillian Tindall, Rosamond Lehmann, 1985
- Wiktoria Dorosz, Subjective Vision and Human Relationships in the Novels of Rosamond Lehmann, 1975
- Wendy Pollard, Rosamond Lehmann and Her Critics: the Vagaries of Literary Reception, 2004
- Françoise Bort, Marie-Françoise Cachin, Rosamond Lehmann et le métier d'écrivain, 2003
- Ruth Siegel, Rosamond Lehmann: a Thirties Writer, 1990

== Letters ==
- My Dear Alexias: Letters from Wellesley Tudor Pole to Rosamond Lehmann, by Rosamond Lehmann (1979)
