= Wogan Philipps, 2nd Baron Milford =

British communist and member of House of Lords (1902–1993)

The Right Honourable The Lord Milford
- Wogan Philipps, 1926

Member of the House of Lords Lord Temporal
- In office 7 December 1962 – 30 November 1993; Hereditary peerage
- Preceded by: The 1st Baron Milford
- Succeeded by: The 3rd Baron Milford

Personal details
- Born: 25 February 1902 Brentwood, Essex, England
- Died: 30 November 1993 (aged 91) London, England
- Party: Communist Party of Great Britain (CPGB)
- Spouses: Rosamond Lehmann (m. 1928; div. 1944); Cristina, Countess of Huntingdon (m. 1944; died 1953); Tamara Rust (m. 1954)
- Children: Hugo Philipps married Margaret Heathcote 7/9/1951 Sarah Philipps married Patrick Kavanagh
- Parent: Laurence Philipps, 1st Baron Milford (father)
- Education: Eton College, Oxford University, Magdalen College
- Occupation: Ambulance driver, lord, artist

Wogan Philipps, 2nd Baron Milford (25 February 1902 – 30 November 1993) was a British communist who volunteered to aid the Republicans in the Spanish Civil War. He was the only member of the Communist Party of Great Britain to ever sit in the House of Lords.

== Early life ==
Wogan Philipps was the eldest son of Laurence Philipps, 1st Baron Milford. Wogan aimed to become an artist and after studying at Oxford, he set up a studio in Paris, but found little success.

== Spanish Civil War ==
In the summer of 1936, he abandoned his artistic endeavours to work with Spanish Medical Aid in the Spanish Civil War. He and George Green served together as ambulance drivers for the Republican faction. During the conflict, Philipps was wounded and had to return to Britain. While there, he asked George's wife Nan if she would go to Spain and work in a hospital. She agreed and in the absence of the Green parents, Philipps paid for the education and maintenance of their children at Summerhill School.

In 1937, Philipps joined the Communist Party of Great Britain (CPGB), which led his father to disinherit him. At the end of the Spanish Civil War, Philipps chartered a ship, paid for by donations, to transport 5,000 Spanish Republicans from France to Mexico.

== Post-war life and career ==
Having worked as an agricultural labourer in Gloucestershire during World War II, Philipps became involved in the National Union of Agricultural Workers. In 1946, he was elected as a Communist councillor on the Cirencester Urban District Council; however, he soon lost the seat. In the 1950 general election, he stood for the House of Commons in the Cirencester and Tewkesbury constituency, but took only 432 votes. During the campaign, he was harassed by what one observer described as "a large colony of Mosley fascists". In 1959, Philipps narrowly lost a rural council by-election. Following this, he and his third wife went to study in the Soviet Union.

In 1963, Philipps inherited his father's title and agreed to sit in the House of Lords as the second Baron Milford. Ironically, this meant that the CPGB's last parliamentary representative was in the House of Lords. He intended to renounce the peerage, but CPGB leader Harry Pollitt persuaded him to stay on. In his maiden speech, Philipps called for the abolition of the institution of un-elected Lords.

== Personal life and death ==
In 1928, Philipps married the novelist Rosamond Lehmann. The couple had two children: Hugo, who became 3rd Baron Milford on his father's death, and Sarah. By the end of the 1930s, Lehmann had left Philipps for poet Cecil Day-Lewis, but she and Philipps did not divorce until 1944.

Philipps' second marriage was to Cristina Casati, Viscountess Hastings, in 1944. She was previously married to Francis Hastings, 16th Earl of Huntingdon and was the only child of the eccentric Italian arts patron Luisa Casati. The couple ran a progressive farm in Gloucestershire. Cristina died in 1953. A year later, Philipps married Tamara Kravetz, the widow of William Rust, editor of the Daily Worker. The couple moved to Hampstead, where they lived until Philipps' death.

Philipps died in London on 30 November 1993, aged 91.

== Arms ==
Coat of arms of Wogan Philipps, 2nd Baron Milford
| Crest A lion as in the arms. Escutcheon Argent a lion rampant Sable ducally gorged and chained Or. Supporters On either side a horse Argent charged on the shoulder with three bars wavy Azure. Motto Ducit Amor Patriæ (Patriotism My Motive) |

Peerage of the United Kingdom
| Preceded by Laurence Richard Philipps | Baron Milford; 1962–1993 | Succeeded by Hugo John Laurence Philipps |
