= Samuel Shellabarger =

American novelist

Samuel Shellabarger (18 May 1888 – 21 March 1954) was an American educator and author of both scholarly works and best-selling historical novels.

Born 18 May 1888 in Washington, D.C., Shellabarger was orphaned in infancy, upon the death of both his father Robert and his mother Elizabeth, in January 1889. Samuel resultantly was raised in the household of his paternal grandfather also named Samuel Shellabarger, a noted lawyer who had served in Congress during the American Civil War and as Minister to Portugal. The younger Samuel Shellabarger's travels with his grandfather would prove invaluable in the provision of background material for the former's historical novels.

Shellabarger attended private schools and in 1909 graduated from Princeton University, where he would later teach. After studying for a year at the Ludwig-Maximilians-Universität München in Germany, he resumed his studies at Harvard University and Yale University. Despite taking a year off to serve in World War I, he received his doctorate in 1917. In 1915, he married Vivan Georgia Lovegrove Borg whom he had met the year before during a vacation in Sweden. They had four children, but the two boys died: one as an infant and the other serving in World War II. From 1938 to 1946, Samuel Shellabarger served as the head of Columbus School for Girls in Columbus, Ohio. Shellabarger himself died of a heart attack at his Princeton, New Jersey home on 21 March 1954.

Having already published some scholarly works and not wanting to undermine their credibility by publishing fiction, Shellabarger used pen names for his first mysteries and romances: "John Esteven" and then "Peter Loring." He continued to write scholarly works and to teach, but his historical novels proved so popular that he soon started using his own name on them. Some of them were bestsellers and were made into movies.

== Works of fiction ==
- The Door of Death (1928 as John Esteven)
- The Chevalier Bayard (1928)
- The Black Gale (1929)
- Voodoo. A Murder Mystery (1930 as John Esteven)
- By Night at Dinsmore (1935 as John Esteven)
- Lord Chesterfield and His World (1935)
- While Murder Waits (1936–37 as John Esteven)
- Graveyard Watch (1938 as John Esteven)
- Blind Man's Night (1938 as John Esteven)
- Assurance Double Sure (1939 as John Esteven)
- Grief Before Night (1938 as Peter Loring)
- Miss Rolling Stone Who Travels Alone (1939 as Peter Loring)
- Captain from Castile (1946) (1947 film starring Tyrone Power, Cesar Romero, Lee J. Cobb)
- Prince of Foxes (1947) (1949 film starring Tyrone Power and Orson Welles)
- The King's Cavalier (1950)
- Lord Vanity (1953)
- The Token (1955)
- Tolbecken (1956)
