= Victoria A. Harden =

American medical historian

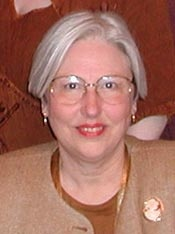
- Born: Victoria Angela Harden
- Occupation: Medical historian

Academic background
- Education: Emory University (BA); University of Florida (MA); Emory University (PhD)
- Thesis: Toward a National Institute of Health: The Development of Federal Biomedical Research Policy, 1900-1930 (1983)
- Doctoral advisor: James Harvey Young

Academic work
- Discipline: History of U.S. biomedical research
- Institutions: National Institutes of Health
- Website: victoriaharden.com

Victoria Angela Harden is an American medical historian who was the founding director of the Office of NIH History and the Stetten Museum at the National Institutes of Health. Most known for organizing conferences and publishing works on the history of HIV/AIDS, Harden also authored books on the history of the NIH and Rocky Mountain spotted fever. She is a past president of the Society for History in the Federal Government.

== Education ==
Harden completed a B.A. in American history at Emory University in 1966. She finished a M.A. at University of Florida in 1968. Harden earned a Ph.D. in American history at Emory University in 1983. Her doctoral advisor was James Harvey Young. She conducted much of her dissertation research as a fellow at the National Museum of American History. During a post-doctoral year at the Institute for the History of Medicine of Johns Hopkins School of Medicine, she was supported by a grant from the United States National Library of Medicine and completed work on Inventing the NIH: Federal Biomedical Research Policy, 1887-1937 (1986).

== Career ==
From 1984-1986 Harden was on the staff of the National Institute of Allergy and Infectious Diseases (NIAID), researching and writing Rocky Mountain Spotted Fever: History of a Twentieth-Century Disease (1990). It won the 1991 Henry Adams prize of the Society for History in the Federal Government for the best book published in 1990 about the history of the federal government. In 1989 and 1993 Harden organized conferences on the history of AIDS. The proceedings were published as AIDS and the Historian (1991) and AIDS and the Public Debate: Historical and Contemporary Perspectives (1995). In June 2001, she launched a website commemorating the twentieth anniversary of the first publication about AIDS: In Their Own Words: NIH Researchers Recall the Early Years of AIDS. During the 1986-87 observance of the National Institutes of Health (NIH) centennial, Harden oversaw the creation and development of the Stetten Museum at the National Institutes of Health (NIH) and the Office of NIH History. She served as its director until her retirement in 2006. Harden continues to serve the office as a special volunteer.

Harden has served on the executive councils of the American Historical Association and the American Association for the History of Medicine. In 1993-94, she served as president of the Washington Society for the History of Medicine and in 1998-99 as president of the Society for History in the Federal Government. In 2006, she was awarded the Herbert Feis prize for outstanding contributions to public history by the American Historical Association, and in 2007 the Lifetime Achievement Award of the American Association for the History of Medicine.

In 2012, Harden published AIDS at 30: A History, an overview of the epidemic emphasizing the response of the medical community—physicians and nurses, public health officials, and biomedical researchers—to AIDS.

== Selected works ==
=== Books ===
- Harden, Victoria Angela (1986). Inventing the NIH: Federal Biomedical Research Policy, 1887-1937. Johns Hopkins University Press. ISBN 978-0-8018-3071-6.
- Harden, Victoria A. (1990). Rocky Mountain Spotted Fever: History of a Twentieth-century Disease. Johns Hopkins University Press. ISBN 978-0-8018-3905-4.
- Harden, Victoria A. (2012). AIDS at 30: A History. Potomac Books. ISBN 978-1-61234-516-1.

=== Edited volumes ===
- Harden, Victoria Angela; Risse, Guenter B., eds. (1991). AIDS and the Historian: Proceedings of a Conference at the National Institutes of Health, 20-21 March 1989. U.S. Department of Health and Human Services, Public Health Service, National Institutes of Health.
- Hannaway, Caroline; Harden, Victoria A.; Parascandola, John, eds. (1995). AIDS and the Public Debate: Historical and Contemporary Perspectives. Amsterdam; Washington, DC; Tokyo: IOS Press; Ohmsha. ISBN 978-90-5199-190-1. OCLC 32964619.
- Farreras, Ingrid G.; Hannaway, Caroline; Harden, Victoria Angela, eds. (2004). Mind, Brain, Body, and Behavior: Foundations of Neuroscience and Behavioral Research at the National Institutes of Health. IOS Press. ISBN 978-1-58603-471-9.

=== Journal articles ===
- D'Souza, M. Patricia; Harden, Victoria (December 1996). "Chemokines and HIV–1 Second Receptors". Nature Medicine. 2 (12): 1293–1300. doi:10.1038/nm1296-1293. ISSN 1546-170X. PMID 8946819. S2CID 34538821.
- Harden, Victoria A. (1992). "Koch's Postulates and the Etiology of AIDS: An Historical Perspective". History and Philosophy of the Life Sciences. 14 (2): 245–65. PMID 1342726.
- Harden, Victoria A. (Winter 1985). "Rocky Mountain Spotted Fever Research and the Development of the Insect Vector Theory, 1900-1930". Bulletin of the History of Medicine. 59 (4): 449–466. PMID 3912018.
