= Genevieve Miller Lifetime Achievement Award =

- Sponsored by: American Association for the History of Medicine
- Country: United States
- Formerly called: American Association for the History of Medicine Lifetime Achievement Award
- Established: 1988

The Genevieve Miller Lifetime Achievement Award, formerly known as the American Association for the History of Medicines's Lifetime Award, established in 1988, is presented annually to a retired member of the American Association for the History of Medicine who has demonstrated significant contributions to history of medicine. It was renamed in honour of Genevieve Miller in 2014.

== Recipients ==
List of past awardees
Year	Image	Recipient	Notes
1988		Saul Jarcho, Lester S. King	
1991		John Duffy	
1992		James Harvey Young	
1993		Whitfield Bell Jr.	
2002		Rosemary A. Stevens	
2003		William H. Helfand	
2004		Thomas N. Bonner, Frederic L. Holmes	
2005		Guenter B. Risse	
2006		Gerald N. Grob	
2007		Victoria A. Harden	
2010		Charles E. Rosenberg	
2011		Judith Walzer Leavitt	
2012		Robert J. T. Joy	
2013		John Parascandola	
2014		John Chynoweth Burnham	
2016		John Eyler	
2019		Jacalyn Duffin	
2020		Theodore M. Brown	
2021		Susan Mokotoff Reverby	
2022		W. Bruce Fye	
2024		Emily Abel	
