= William H. Welch Medal =

Annual award by the American Association for the History of Medicine (AAHM)

The William H. Welch Medal is an annual award given by the American Association for the History of Medicine (AAHM) to the author or co-authors of an outstanding book in medical history. According to the current rules, the award is not for editorial work. The book must be published during the five years preceding the award, which is presented at the AAHM's annual meeting. Any author who is awarded the William H. Welch is ineligible for subsequent awards of the medal — this rule of ineligibility was instituted in 1973, after Erwin Ackerknecht received the medal in 1953 and in 1972. The medal is named in honor of William H. Welch, M.D., a pathologist, bacteriologist, and first dean of the Johns Hopkins School of Medicine. The inaugural medal was awarded in 1950 to Henry E. Sigerist. He grew up in Paris and Zurich and in 1932 moved to the United States as the successor to William H. Welch as director of the Johns Hopkins University Institute of the History of Medicine.

== Past recipients ==
The medal has been awarded every year since 1971. Before 1971, there were some years in which the medal was not awarded.

- 2023 — Yan Liu, Healing with Poisons: Potent Medicines in Medieval China (University of Washington Press, 2021) ISBN 0295748990
- 2022 — Jaipreet Virdi, Hearing Happiness: Deafness Cures in History (University of Chicago Press, 2020) ISBN 0226824063
- 2021 — Benjamin Breen, The Age of Intoxication: Origins of the Global Drug Trade (University of Pennsylvania Press, 2019); Breen, Benjamin (20 December 2019). 2019 pbk edition. University of Pennsylvania Press. ISBN 978-0-8122-9662-4. 10-digit ISBN 0812224981
- 2020 — Nicole Barnes, Intimate Communities: Wartime Healthcare and the Birth of Modern China, 1937–1945 (University of California Press, 2018) ASIN B07JMTSRNW ISBN 0520300467
- 2019 — Pablo Gómez, The Experiential Caribbean: Creating Knowledge and Healing in the Early Modern Atlantic (University of North Carolina Press, 2017); Gómez, Pablo F. (23 February 2017). 2017 pbk edition. UNC Press Books. ISBN 9781469630878.
- 2018 — Cristian Berco, From Body to Community: Venereal Disease and Society in Baroque Spain (University of Toronto Press, 2016) ISBN 9781442649620
- 2017 — Johanna Schoen, Abortion After Roe: Abortion After Legalization (University of North Carolina Press, 2015) ISBN 1469621185
- 2016 — Sean Hsiang-Lin Lei, Neither Donkey Nor Horse: Medicine in the Struggle Over China’s Modernity (University of Chicago Press, 2014) ISBN 022616988X
- 2015 — Leslie J. Reagan, Dangerous Pregnancies: Mothers, Disabilities, and Abortion in Modern America (University of California Press, 2010) ISBN 9780520259034
- 2014 — Julie Livingston, Improvising Medicine: An African Oncology Ward in an Emerging Cancer Epidemic (Duke, University Press, 2012) ISBN 9780822395768
- 2013 — Michael Willrich, Pox: An American History (Penguin Press, 2011) ISBN 9781594202865
- 2012 — Gregg Mitman, Breathing Space: How Allergies Shape Our Lives and Landscapes (Yale University Press, 2007) ISBN 9780300110357
- 2011 — Allan M. Brandt, The Cigarette Century: The Rise, Fall, and Deadly Persistence of the Product That Defined America (Basic Books, 2007) ISBN 0465070477
- 2010 — Warwick Anderson, The Collectors of Lost Souls: Turning Kuru Scientists into Whitemen (The Johns Hopkins University Press: 2008) ISBN 0801890403
- 2009 — Katharine Park, Secrets of Women: Gender, Generation, and the Origins of Human Dissection (Zone Books, 2006) ISBN 1890951684
- 2008 — Frank M. Snowden III, The Conquest of Malaria: Italy, 1900-1962 (New Haven: Yale University Press 2006) ISBN 0300108990
- 2007 — Ruth Rogaski, Hygienic Modernity: Meaning of Health and Disease in Treaty-Port China (Berkeley: University of California Press, 2004) ISBN 0520283821
- 2006 — Barron H. Lerner, Breast Cancer Wars: Hope, Fear, and the Pursuit of a Cure in Twentieth Century America (New York: Oxford University Press, 2001) ISBN 0195142616
- 2005 — Keith Wailoo, Dying in the City of the Blues: Sickle Cell Anemia and the Politics of Race and Health (Chapel Hill: University of North Carolina Press, 2001) ISBN 0807825840
- 2004 — Kenneth Ludmerer, Time to Heal: American Medical Education from the Turn of the Century to the Era of Managed Care (New York: Oxford University Press, 1999) LCCN 98-55496
- 2003 — Roy Porter, The Greatest Benefit to Mankind: A Medical History of Humanity from Antiquity to the Present (London: HarperCollins, 1997); Porter, Roy (17 October 1999). 1999 pbk edition. W. W. Norton & Company. ISBN 0-393-31980-6.
- 2002 — Nancy Tomes, The Gospel of Germs: Men, Women and the Microbe in American Life (Cambridge, MA: Harvard University Press, 1998). ISBN 0674357086
- 2001 — Shigehisa Kuriyama, The Expressiveness of the Body and the Divergence of Greek and Chinese Medicine (NY: Zone Books, 1999)
- 2000 — W. Bruce Fye, American Cardiology: The History of a Specialty and its College (Johns Hopkins University Press, 1996)
- 1999 — Jack D. Pressman, Last Resort: Psychosurgery and the Limits of Medicine (Cambridge University Press, 1998); Pressman, Jack D. (8 August 2002). 2002 pbk edition. Cambridge University Press. ISBN 0521524598.
- 1998 — Mary Lindemann, Health and Healing in Eighteenth-Century Germany (Johns Hopkins University Press, 1995)
- 1997 — Harold J. Cook, Trials of an Ordinary Doctor: Joannes Groenevelt in Seventeenth-Century London (Johns Hopkins University Press, 1994)
- 1996 — Gerald L. Geison, The Private Science of Louis Pasteur (Princeton University Press, 1995) Geison, Gerald L. (14 July 2014). 2014 pbk reprint. Princeton University Press. ISBN 978-0-691-03442-3.
- 1995 — Laurel Thatcher Ulrich, A Midwife’s Tale (NY: Knopf, distributed by Random House, 1990)
- 1994 — Michael R. McVaugh, Medicine Before the Plague: Practitioners and Their Patients in the Crown of Aragon, 1285–1345 (Cambridge University Press, 1993)
- 1993 — Heinrich von Staden, Herophilus: The Art of Medicine in Ancient Alexandria (Cambridge University Press, 1989)
- 1992 — Philip Curtin, Death by Migration (Cambridge University Press, 1989)
- 1991 — John Harley Warner, The Therapeutic Perspective: Medical Knowledge and Identity in America, 1820–1855 (Harvard University Press, 1986) LCCN 85-30235 OCLC 13063089
- 1990 — Rosemary Stevens, In Sickness and in Wealth: American Hospitals in the Twentieth Century (NY: Basic Books, 1989)
- 1989 — Richard J. Evans, Death in Hamburg: Society and Politics in the Cholera Years, 1830–1910 (Oxford University Press, 1987)
- 1988 — Guenter B. Risse, Hospital Life in Enlightenment Scotland: Care and Teaching at the Royal Infirmary of Edinburgh (Oxford University Press, 1987)
- 1987 — James H. Cassedy (1919–2007), American Medicine and Statistical Thinking, 1800–1860 (Harvard University Press, 1984) ISBN 0674732200; and Medicine and American Growth, 1800–1860 (University of Wisconsin Press, 1986) ISBN 0299109003
- 1986 — Gerald N. Grob, The State and the Mentally Ill: A History of the Worcester State Hospital (University of North Carolina Press, 1966); and Mental Institutions in America (NY: Free Press, 1972); and Mental Illness and American Society, 1897–1940 (Princeton University Press, 1983)
- 1985 — Nancy G. Siraisi, Taddeo Alderotti and His Pupils: Two Generations of Italian Medical Learning (Princeton University Press, 1981)
- 1984 — Michael Bliss, The Discovery of Insulin (University of Chicago Press, 1982)
- 1983 — Robert Gregg Frank, Harvey and the Oxford Physiologists: Scientific Ideas and Social Interaction (University of California Press, 1980) LCCN 79-63553 ISBN 0520039068
- 1982 — James Harvey Young, "for scholarly contributions to the history of medicine"
- 1981 — Erna Lesky, "for significant contributions to the history of medicine"
- 1980 — John Ballard Blake (1922–2006), "for his valuable scholarly contributions to the history of medicine"
- 1979 — Charles Webster, The Great Instauration: Medicine and Reform, 1626–1660 (NY: Holmes and Meier Publishers, 1976, c1975)
- 1978 — Frederic L. Holmes, Claude Bernard and Animal Chemistry: The Emergence of a Scientist (Harvard University Press, 1974) ISBN 0674134850
- 1977 — Lester S. King, ”for his scholarly contributions to the history of medicine”
- 1976 — Lelland J. Rather, Addison and the White Corpuscles (University of California Press, 1972) ISBN 0854840117; and Mind and Body in Eighteenth-Century Medicine (University of California Press, 1965), Rather, L. J. (13 May 2022). 2023 Kindle Edition. Univ of California Press. ISBN 978-0520358980.; and for “his important continuing studies in the history of medicine”
- 1975 — George W. Corner, "for invaluable contributions"
- 1974 — Walter Pagel, "for extensive and most valuable publications"
- 1973 — Margaret Tallmadge May, Galen on the Usefulness of the Parts of the Body (Cornell University Press, 1968)
- 1972 — Erwin H. Ackerknecht, Medicine at the Paris Hospital, 1794–1848 (Johns Hopkins University Press, 1962)
- 1971 — Charles Donald O’Malley (1907–1970), (posthumously) "for scholarly contributions"
- 1970 — No award
- 1969 — Charles E. Rosenberg, The Cholera Years (University of Chicago Press, 1962); Rosenberg, Charles E. (6 February 2009). 2009 pbk edition. University of Chicago Press. ISBN 978-0-226-72677-9.
- 1968 — Saul Benison, Tom Rivers: Reflections on a Life in Medicine and Science (M.I.T. Press, 1967) OCLC 01085060
- 1967 — Howard B. Adelman, Marcello Malpighi and the Evolution of Embryology (Cornell University Press, 1966) ISBN 080140004X
- 1966 — Whitfield J. Bell Jr., John Morgan: Continental Doctor (University of Pennsylvania Press, 1965); Whitfield j. Bell, Jr (11 November 2016). 2016 pbk edition. University of Pennsylvania Press. ISBN 978-1-5128-0031-9.
- 1965 — No award
- 1964 — No award
- 1963 — Saul Jarcho, "for scholarly contributions"
- 1962 — Genevieve Miller, The Adoption of Inoculation for Smallpox in England and France (University of Kentucky Press, 1960)
- 1961 — George Rosen, "for contributions to the social history of medicine"
- 1960 — Richard H. Shryock, "for scholarly contributions"
- 1959 — No award
- 1958 — Charles F. Mullett (1901–1994), The Bubonic Plague and England: An Essay in the History of Preventive Medicine (University of Kentucky Press, 1956) LCCN 56-6994
- 1957 — No award
- 1956 — Lyman Henry Butterfield (editor), Letters of Benjamin Rush (Princeton University Press, 1951) LCCN 51-11569; Butterfield, Lyman Henry (6 August 2019). 2019 pbk edition. Princeton University Press. ISBN 978-0-691-62735-9.
- 1955 — No award
- 1954 — Jerome Pierce Webster and Martha Teach Gnudi, The Life and Times of Gaspare Tagliacozzi (New York: Reichner, 1950) LCCN 51-2026
- 1953 — Erwin H. Ackerknecht, "for scholarly contributions"
- 1952 — Owsei Temkin, "for scholarly contributions"
- 1951 — No award
- 1950 — Henry E. Sigerist, "for scholarly contribution"
