= Genevieve Miller =

- Born: 15 October 1914
- Died: 23 June 2013 (aged 98)

Academic background
- Academic advisor: Henry E. Sigerist

Academic work
- Discipline: History of medicine

Genevieve Miller (October 15, 1914 – June 23, 2013) was an American medical historian, medical museum curator and director.

== Biography ==
Genevieve Miller was born on 15 October 1914 in Butler, Pennsylvania. She graduated from public schools in Butler. In 1935, she graduated from Baltimore's Goucher College with a bachelor's degree in chemistry. In 1939, she completed her M.A. in the history of medicine from the Institute of the History of Medicine of Johns Hopkins University. Her mentor and the supervisor of her M.A. thesis was Henry E. Sigerist. At the Institute of the History of Medicine of Johns Hopkins University, Miller was an instructor from 1943 to 1948. During those years, she began to work on her doctoral dissertation. She graduated in 1955 with a Ph.D. in the history of science from Cornell University. Her 355-page dissertation The Adoption of Inoculation for Smallpox in England and France was published in 1957 in Philadelphia by University of Pennsylvania Press and in London by Oxford University Press. The book gained esteem for her "immense industry and care" and is "still considered a classic work in the history of medicine."

At Case Western Reserve University (CWRU) School of Medicine in Cleveland, Miller held appointments in the history of medicine as assistant professor from 1953 to 1967 and as associate professor from 1967 to 1979. She retired as associate professor emerita in 1979. A CWRU's Dittrick Museum of Medical History, she was a curator from 1962 to 1967 and the director from 1967 to 1979. As director, Miller created the Robert M. Stecher Rare Book Room to store and display of a notable collection of Darwin and Freud literature, and hired a rare book librarian.

For the Bulletin of the History of Medicine, Miller served as an associate editor from 1944 to 1948, as acting editor in 1948, and as a member of the advisory editorial board from 1960 to 1992. From 1948 to 1965 she was a member of the editorial board of the Journal of the History of Medicine and Allied Sciences.

In 1979 she moved to Baltimore, but after about two years, she returned to Cleveland to be near her friends and familiar surroundings. She lived at Judson Manor, a retirement community about .4 miles (.64 km) from the CWRU campus. She enjoyed travel and was greatly interested in ancient architecture. Her grave is in Cleveland's Lake View Cemetery.

== Awards and honors ==
For her book The Adoption of the Inoculation for Smallpox in England and France, Miller received the 1962 William H. Welch Medal of the American Association for the History of Medicine (AAHM). She delivered the 1973 Fielding H. Garrison Lecture of the AAHM and from 1978 to 1980 served as the AAHM's president. In 1999 she received the AAHM's Lifetime Achievement Award. In 2014 the AAHM renamed their Lifetime Achievement Award the "Genevieve Miller Lifetime Achievement Award" in her honor. In 2007 she received the Recognition of Merit Award of the Archivists and Librarians in the History of the Health Sciences, which is now merged into the Librarians, Archivists, and Museum Professionals in the History of the Health Sciences (LAMPHHS).

== Selected publications ==
- Miller, Genevieve (1943). "An Autograph Letter of Orfila". Bulletin of the History of Medicine. 13 (3): 320–327. JSTOR 44440783. (See Mathieu Orfila.)
- —— (1945). "Editorial: The Study of American Medical History". Bulletin of the History of Medicine. 17 (1): 1–8. JSTOR 44440992.
- —— (January 1945). "Social Services in a Civil War Hospital in Baltimore". Bulletin of the History of Medicine. 17 (5). Baltimore, Md.: 439–459.
- William Beaumont's formative years; two early notebooks, 1811-1812. New York: Schuman. 1946. LCCN med47000035; xv+87 pages, illustrated; with annotations and an introductory essay by Genevieve Miller; Beaumont, William (September 2010). 2010 pbk reprint. Kessinger's Legacy Reprints. ISBN 978-1163147535. (See William Beaumont.)
- —— (1946). "Dr. John Morgan's Report to General Washington, March 3, 1776". Bulletin of the History of Medicine. 19 (4): 450–454. JSTOR 44442895. (See John Morgan (physician).)
- —— (1948). "Letters of Edward Jenner". Medical Arts and Sciences: A Scientific Journal of the College of Medical Evangelists. 2 (1): 5–17. (See Edward Jenner.)
- —— (1956). "Smallpox Inoculation in England and America: A Reappraisal". The William and Mary Quarterly. 13 (4): 476–492. doi:10.2307/1917019. JSTOR 1917019. PMID 19928343.
- —— (1962). ""Airs, Waters, and Places" in History". Journal of the History of Medicine and Allied Sciences. 17 (1): 129–140. doi:10.1093/jhmas/XVII.1.129. JSTOR 24620862. PMID 14473997.
- ——, ed. (1964). Bibliography of the history of medicine of the United States and Canada, 1939-1960. Baltimore: Johns Hopkins Press. LCCN 64024347; xvi+428 pages; with a historical introduction by W. B. McDaniel, 2d.
- ——, ed. (1966). A bibliography of the writings of Henry E. Sigerist. Montreal: McGill University Press. LCCN 66019764; vi+112 pages
- —— (1976). "A Physician in 1776". Clio Medica. Acta Academiae Internationalis Historiae Medicinae. Vol. 11. pp. 135–145. doi:10.1163/9789004418233_036. ISBN 978-90-04-41823-3.
- "Chapter. A Physician in 1776 by Genevieve Miller". Clio Medica. Acta Academiae Internationalis Historiae Medicinae. Vol. 11. Brill. 1976. pp. 135–145. doi:10.1163/9789004418233_036.
- —— (1981). "Putting Lady Mary in Her Place: A Discussion of Historical Causation". Bulletin of the History of Medicine. 55 (1): 2–16. JSTOR 44442967. PMID 7011451. 1981
- Silverstein, Arthur M.; —— (July 1981). "The royal experiment on immunity: 1721–1722". Cellular Immunology. 61 (2): 437–447. doi:10.1016/0008-8749(81)90391-9. PMID 7018701.
