= Barron H. Lerner =

American doctor and historian

- Born: September 27, 1960 (age 66); Boston, Massachusetts, U.S.
- Education: University of Pennsylvania; Columbia University (MD); University of Washington (PhD)
- Occupations: Doctor; historian; bioethicist
- Spouse: Cathy Seibel (m. 1990)

Barron H. Lerner (born 27 September 1960) is an American doctor and historian, who is a member of the faculty at the New York University Langone School of Medicine. He received his M.D. from Columbia in 1986 and his Ph.D. in history from the University of Washington in 1996. In addition to his research, Lerner practices internal medicine and teaches medical ethics and the history of medicine.

== Early life and education ==
Lerner was born on September 27, 1960, in Boston, Massachusetts, to infectious disease doctor Phillip I. Lerner and teacher Ronnie Lerner (née Hober). He was raised in Cleveland, Ohio. He graduated from Hawken School in 1978, from the University of Pennsylvania in 1982, and from Columbia University's medical school in 1986.

== Career ==
His book The Breast Cancer Wars: Hope, Fear and the Pursuit of a Cure in Twentieth-Century America, published in 2001, was cited as an American Library Association Notable Book the following year. Lerner also received the 2006 William H. Welch Medal of the American Association for the History of Medicine for the book; one such Medal is awarded each year to the author or authors of a book of "outstanding scholarly merit in the field of medical history" published during the five calendar years preceding the award.

His book One for the Road: Drunk Driving Since 1900, is the first history of drunk driving in America. It was published by Johns Hopkins University Press in October 2011.

Two of Lerner's other books are Contagion and Confinement: Controlling Tuberculosis on the Skid Road (1998) and When Illness Goes Public: Celebrity Patients and How We Look at Medicine (2006).

Lerner's fifth book, The Good Doctor: A Father, a Son, and the Evolution of Medical Ethics, was published in May 2014. It tells the true story of two doctors, a father and son, who practiced in very different times and the evolution of the ethics, paternalism, and patient autonomy that profoundly influenced health care. The son and father here are Lerner and his father, Phillip I. Lerner. The New York Times reviewed the book in July 2014, saying, "The Good Doctor is more than a son’s search to understand his father’s actions. It raises pointed questions about his own. Was his father just part of an older generation whose ideas had lost their relevance? Or did the son need to revisit ethical norms he had embraced and taught to thousands of trainees? As he asks, 'Did physicians of my father’s era actually know their patients in a different — and better — way than physicians do today?'"

Lerner writes regularly on topics in clinical medicine, bioethics and medical history for The New York Times, The Washington Post, Slate, The Huffington Post and other publications. He currently teaches courses for the Global Public Health Program at New York University. In addition, he is a physician at Bellevue Hospital.

Among Lerner's many contributions to The New York Times is an August 2011 op-ed piece entitled, "The Annals of Extreme Surgery". It expressed concern over the increasing use of the HIPEC procedure, a controversial treatment for certain cancers.

After his 9-year-old nephew Cooper Stock was struck and killed by a taxi in New York City while crossing the street with the right of way, Lerner wrote a piece for The New York Times blog entitled "Treat Reckless Driving Like Drunk Driving." In it, he notes that reckless driving "is poorly defined in the law, sometimes poorly investigated by police and almost never results in a criminal charge," much like drunk driving was treated in the 1980s. He calls to "make destruction caused by irresponsible driving a true crime."

He has misophonia.

He is the author of several articles in the New England Journal of Medicine and The Lancet:

- Lerner BH. Sins of omission: cancer research without informed consent. N Engl J Med. 2004;351:628-630.
- Lerner BH. Last-ditch medical therapy—revisiting lobotomy. N Engl J Med. 2005;353:119-121.
- Lerner BH. Remembering Berton Roueche—master of medical mysteries. N Engl J Med. 2005;353:2428-2431.
- Lerner BH. Subjects or objects? Prisoners and human experimentation. N Engl J Med. 2007;356:1806-1807.
- Lerner BH. When diseases disappear—the case of familial dysautonomia. N Engl J Med. 2009;361:1622-1625.
- Lerner BH. "I was the first": revisiting a paediatric heart transplantation. Lancet. 2008;371:1158-1159.
- Lerner BH. Curing formerly fatal childhood cancers. Lancet. 2008;371:1655-1656.
- Lerner BH. Drunk driving, distracted driving, moralism and public health. N Engl J Med. 2011;365:879-881.
- Lerner BH. Days of the giants: remembering Robert F. Loeb. Lancet. 2012;380:798-799.
- Lerner BH. Medical Expertise — Balancing Science, Values, and Trust. N Engl J Med. 2024;391:577-579.

== Media ==
- The Breast Cancer Wars, Interview with Barron Lerner on NPR's Fresh Air in 2001.
- Learning to Relate to Patients Interview with Barron Lerner on NPR's All Things Considered, 2006.
- Celebrities and Medical Treatment Interview with Barron Lerner on NPR's Talk of the Nation - Science Friday, 9 February 2007.
- The Celebrity of Disease Interview with Barron Lerner in U.S. News & World Report, 5 November 2006
- 'The Good Doctor' Puts Past Medical Practices Under an Ethical Microscope NPR's Fresh Air with Terry Gross. 13 May 2014.
- The Most Unusual Day. Yahoo News. 11 March 2020
- Doctor who recovered from coronavirus returns to treat more patients. Interview with Barron Lerner on CNN with Jake Tapper. 2020
- A Bioethicist on the Vaccine Rollout. WNYC/NPR All Of It with Alison Stewart, 2 March 2021

== Contributions & Essays ==
- Lerner BH. Tough Love' Lessons From a Deadly Epidemic. The New York Times, 27 June 2006.
- Lerner BH. Hope and reality Lou Gehrig’s way. The New York Times, 19 April 2005.
- Lerner BH. Enduring and endearing, a patient moves in. The New York Times, 13 December 2005.
- Lerner BH. Young doctors learn quickly in the hot seat. The New York Times, 14 March 2006.
- Lerner BH. When the disease eludes a diagnosis. The New York Times, 25 March 2008.
- Lerner BH. At bedside, stay stoic or display emotions? The New York Times, 22 April 2008.
- Please Stop Making That Noise, The New York Times, 24 February 2015
- Michael J. Fox: The Impact of a Very Famous Patient Fox. medium.com 9 December 2020
- Resisting Public Measures, Then and Now, thehastingscenter.org, 2 December 2020
- Good history means grappling with people’s complicated legacies, WashingtonPost.com, 21 December 2020
