= Owsei Temkin =

Russian-born American medical historian (1902–2002)

- Аўсей Цемкін
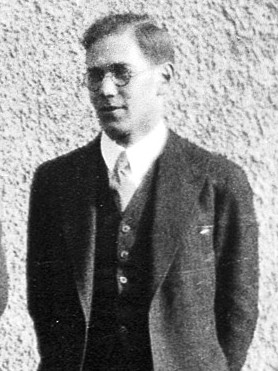
- Owsei Temkin in 1929
- Born: October 6, 1902; Russia
- Died: July 18, 2002 (aged 99)
- Education: University of Leipzig
- Awards: Welch Medal (1952); Sarton Medal (1960)
- Scientific career
- Fields: History of Medicine
- Workplaces: Johns Hopkins University

Owsei Temkin (Belarusian: Аўсей Цемкін; October 6, 1902 – July 18, 2002) was William H. Welch Professor Emeritus of the History of Medicine at Johns Hopkins University. He was a Russian-born, German-educated, American medical historian.

== Early life and education ==
Owsei Temkin was born in Minsk, Belarus (then part of Russia), on October 6, 1902, the son of Samuel and Anna (Raskin) Temkin. In 1905 his Jewish family moved to Leipzig, Germany, to avoid pogroms. In Leipzig he attended the Real-Gymnasium. After the Russian revolution of 1917, his family lost its Russian citizenship.

== Career ==
After receiving his M.D. from the University of Leipzig in 1927, Temkin worked in the university's institute for the history of medicine as an Assistent and Privatdozent before moving to the United States in 1932. He then moved with Henry E. Sigerist to the Johns Hopkins University's new Rockefeller-funded Institute for the History of Medicine, and he worked at Johns Hopkins through and after his retirement, emeritus, in 1968. He became director of the Institute of the History of Medicine at Johns Hopkins in 1958.

He became known as one of the world's foremost experts on the interaction of medicine and culture throughout history. He was a longtime editor of the Bulletin of the History of Medicine. During his academic career and retirement, he published hundreds of articles and a dozen books on the history of medicine. His last book was published in the year of his death on July 18, 2002, at age 99.

Temkin received the Welch Medal and the Sarton Medal and was elected to the American Philosophical Society, the National Academy of Sciences, and the American Academy of Arts and Sciences.

== Selected publications ==
- The Falling Sickness: A History of Epilepsy from the Greeks to the Beginnings of Modern Neurology. Baltimore, MD: Johns Hopkins University Press; 1945, Revised 1971; ISBN 0-8018-1211-9)
- Galenism: Rise and Decline of a Medical Philosophy Ithaca, NY: Cornell University Press, 1973, ISBN 0-8014-0774-5)
- The Double Face of Janus and Other Essays in the History of Medicine Baltimore, MD: Johns Hopkins University Press, 1977, ISBN 0-8018-1859-1)
- "On Second Thought" and Other Essays in the History of Medicine and Science. Baltimore, MD: Johns Hopkins University Press, 2002.
- Respect for Life in Medicine, Philosophy, and the Law. Baltimore, MD: Johns Hopkins University Press, 1977 (co-author).
- Hippocrates in a World of Pagans and Christians. Baltimore, MD: Johns Hopkins University Press, 1991.
- Antimalarial Drugs. Washington, DC: National Research Council, Office of Medical Information, 1944 (co-author).
- Soranus' Gynecology. Baltimore, MD: Johns Hopkins University Press, 1991.
- Ancient Medicine: Selected Papers of Ludwig Edelstein. Baltimore, MD: Johns Hopkins University Press, 1967 (co-editor).
- In Memory of Henry E. Sigerist. Baltimore, MD: Johns Hopkins University Press, 1957.
- "Metaphors of Human Biology". In: Science and Civilization, 1949, pp. 169–194.
- "Science and Society in the Age of Copernicus". In: The Nature of Scientific Discovery, 1975, pp. 106–133.
- A Report on the Medical Treatment of Filariasis Bancroft. Washington, DC: National Research Council, Division of Medical Sciences, 1945.
- Galen's Dissection of the Liver and the Muscles Moving the Forearm. Baltimore, MD: Johns Hopkins University Press, 1946 (co-author).
- "The Philosophical Background of Magendie's Physiology". Bulletin of the History of Medicine, 1946, v. 20.
- Was Servetus Influenced by Ibn an-Nafis? Baltimore, MD: Johns Hopkins University Press, 1940.
- The Classical Roots of Glisson's Doctrine of Irritation. Baltimore, MD: Johns Hopkins University Press, 1964.
- "Materialism in French and German Physiology of the Early Nineteenth Century". Bulletin of the History of Medicine, 1946, v. 20.
- "Byzantine Medicine: Tradition and Empiricism". Dumbarton Oaks Papers, no. 16, pp. 95–115.

== See also ==
- Fielding H. Garrison
