= Lester King =

Lester King may refer to:

- Lester King (cricketer) (1939–1998), Jamaican cricketer
- Lester Charles King (1907–1989), English geologist
- Lester S. King (1908–2002), American pathologist and medical historian

== See also ==
- Jack Lester King
