= George Rosen (physician) =

George Rosen (1910–1977) was an American physician, public health administrator, journal editor, and medical historian. His major interests were of the relationship of social, economic and cultural factors upon health.

== Early life and education ==
Rosen was born in New York City to immigrant parents from Eastern Europe. He was educated in local public schools and graduated from the City College of New York in 1930. Unable to obtain admission to a medical school because of quotas for Jewish students, he entered the University of Berlin Medical School in Germany, and received his medical degree in 1935 after completing a medical thesis. In Berlin, Rosen met the medical historian Henry E. Sigerist from The Johns Hopkins University Medical School, who suggested to Rosen that he write his thesis on William Beaumont who had studied and published on gastric physiology. His friendship with Sigerist became lifelong. While working as a physician and public health administrator, he attended the School of Public Health at Columbia University and earned a Masters of Public Health (MPH) in 1947. In 1950, he became a Diplomate of the American Board of Public Health. Rosen took courses in sociology at Columbia University in 1939 and completed his Ph.D. in sociology in 1944.

== Medical and public health careers ==
Upon his return to New York City, Rosen interned at the Beth-El Hospital in Brooklyn for two years and soon began submitting articles to Sigerist’s Bulletin of the History of Medicine. Rosen began his private practice in 1937 but it was not financially secure and he took a part-time job in the Tuberculosis Service of the New York State Department of Health. In time, the Department of Health job became full-time and Rosen later became administrator of Public Health Clinics in New York. Later, he became a District Health Officer. In 1949, he served as Director of Health Education in the New York City Department of Health.

Rosen entered the U.S. Army during World War II and was assigned to the Surgeon General’s Office as an epidemiologist. He was transferred to London where his knowledge of German was used in intelligence work. He returned to the New York City Department of Health after the war but left in 1950 to become medical director of Health Insurance Program (HIP), a prepaid group medical practice. He stayed for seven years. In 1951, he was appointed to a part-time professorship in health education at Columbia University and taught courses in health education, community health, the sociology of mental illness, and the history of medicine. In 1957, he became a full-time professor. In 1969, Rosen left Columbia to become professor of medical history and public health at Yale University. He remained until his death in 1977.

== Writing career ==
From 1938 to 1944, with the help from Sigerist, Rosen began to submit articles and later editor of The Ciba Foundation Symposium, a historical brochure financed by the drug company and distributed to physicians. In 1944, he took over the editorship until the publication was discontinued in 1950.

Rosen published articles and books on public health and the history of medicine, and the sociological, economic, and cultural aspects on health. By the time he died in 1977, he had a bibliography of nine books and approximately 200 articles. While Rosen was still in the Army, he and two associates founded the Journal of the History of Medicine and Allied Sciences. Rosen was the editor between 1946 and 1952, and he remained on the Editorial Board. He was also the editor of the American Journal of Public Health from 1957 to 1973, served on the Editorial Board, and was known for his erudite editorials on a wide variety of topics.

The George Rosen papers are in the Yale University archives.

In 2014 the American Association for the History of Medicine established in his honor the George Rosen Prize with funding from his daughter, Susan Rosen Koslow. The prize is awarded to the author or coauthors of a historical monograph on public health or social medicine.

== Works ==
- Rosen, George. The Reception of William Beaumont’s Discovery in Europe, by Dr. George Rosen. New York, Schuman’s, 1942.
- Rosen, George. The History of Miners’ Diseases: A Medical and Social Interpretation. New York, Schuman’s, 1943.
- Rosen, George, ed. Herbs and Herbals. Summit, NJ: Ciba Pharmaceutical Products, 1943.
- Rosen, George. The Specialization of Medicine with Particular Reference to Ophthalmology. New York, Froben Press, 1944.
- Rosen, George. Fees and Fee Bills: Some Economic Aspects of Medical Practice in Nineteenth Century America. Baltimore: Johns Hopkins Press, 1946.
- Rosen, George, and Beate Caspari-Rosen. 400 Years of a Doctor’s Life. New York, Schuman, 1947.
- Rosen, George. A History of Public Health. New York, MD Publ., 1958.
- Rosen, George. Victor Robinson: A Romantic Medical Historian. [Philadelphia, Temple Univ. School of Medicine, 1959].
- Anderson, Odin W., and George Rosen. An Examination of the Concept of Preventive Medicine. New York, 1960.
- Rosen, George. Madness in Society: Chapters in the Historical Sociology of Mental Illness. London, Routledge & Paul, 1968.
- Rosen, George. From Medical Police to Social Medicine: Essays on the History of Health Care. New York: Science History Publ., 1974.
- Rosen, George. Preventive Medicine in the United States, 1900-1975: Trends and Interpretations. New York: Science History, 1975.
- Rosenberg, Charles E., ed. Healing and History: Essays for George Rosen. Folkestone, Eng.: Dawson; New York: Science History Publ., 1979.
- Rosen, George. The Structure of American Medical Practice 1825-1944. University of Pennsylvania Press, Philadelphia, 1983.

== Personal life ==
While in medical school Rosen met Beate Caspari and married her in 1933. She was an ophthalmologist. She also assisted Rosen in his historical writings. The couple had two children, Peter and Susan.

Rosen died July 27, 1977, in Oxford, England, where he and Beate were traveling prior to his planned delivery of the keynote address at a major international conference on the history of medicine.
