= John Duffy (medical historian) =

American medical historian (1915–1996)

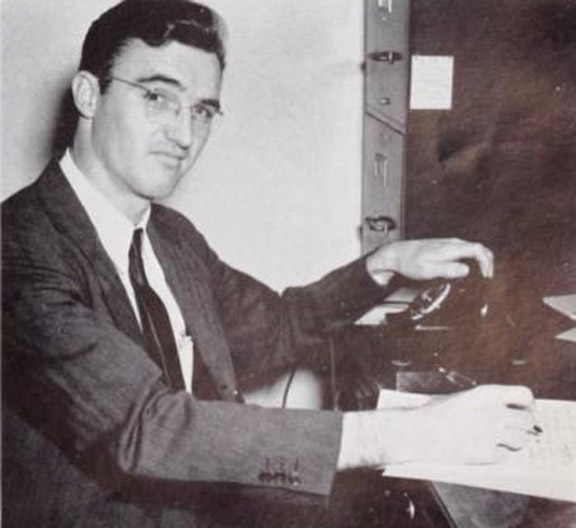
- Duffy in 1941
- Born: March 27, 1915; Barrow-in-Furness, England
- Died: June 20, 1996 (aged 81); Baton Rouge, Louisiana, US
- Occupation: Medical historian
- Title: Emeritus Professor
- Spouse: Corinne Duffy
- Awards: American Association for the History of Medicine's Lifetime Achievement Award

Academic background
- Education: University of California, Los Angeles (Ph.D.)
- Thesis: (1946)

Academic work
- Discipline: History of Medicine
- Institutions: Tulane University; University of Maryland
- Notable works: From Humors to Medical Science (book)

John Duffy (1915–1996) was an American medical historian who wrote books and scholarly journal articles on the history of medical education, public health and epidemics.

== Early life and education ==
Duffy was born on March 27, 1915, in Barrow-in-Furness, England. He immigrated to the United States in 1928, settling at first in Detroit, Michigan, and working for a time in the automobile industry. Duffy became a naturalized citizen of the United States in 1939. He earned a bachelor's degree at the Louisiana State Normal College (now known as the Northwestern State University) in 1941. Duffy completed his master's degree from Louisiana State University (LSU) in 1943 and his PhD from the University of California at Los Angeles (UCLA) in 1946.

== Career ==
=== Academia ===
Following completion of his doctorate, Duffy joined the faculty at Northwestern State College of Louisiana initially teaching English and European history. His interests soon shifted to US History with a specialty in the history of medicine.

Subsequently, Duffy's academic career included teaching at Louisiana State University (1953–1960), the University of Pittsburgh (1960–1965), and Tulane University (1965–1972). He finished his career as the Priscilla Alden Burke Professor of History at the University of Maryland, College Park, having an endowed professorship. Duffy served for a year as the interim editor of the American Historical Review. He retired from academia in 1983 and returned to Baton Rouge, Louisiana, where he resided for the remainder of his retirement, continuing to write and publish works related to public health history.

=== Publications ===
Duffy's first book, Epidemics in Colonial America, was published in 1953 with a subsequent edition released in 1972. The book describes the impact of disease as a significant determinant of the colonization of North America, in addition to famine and war. The book provides prospective on the various diseases that afflicted colonists.

Subsequently, Duffy wrote and published: The Rudolph Matas History of Medicine in Louisiana (2 volumes, 1958 and 1962), Sword of Pestilence and The New Orleans Yellow Fever Epidemic of 1853 (1966), A History of Public Health in New York City (2 volumes, 1968, 1974), The Tulane University Medical Center: 150 years of medical education (1984) and The Sanitarians, A History of American Public Health (1990).

Duffy's book The Tulane University Medical Center: 150 years of medical education was commissioned by Tulane University on the occasion of the sesquicentennial of the Tulane University Medical Center.

His best known book was The Healers (1976). The book describes the rise of modern medicine in the United States and the ways in which the rise was influenced by the impact of disease and pestilence, by demographic changes, and by scientific advances. It also describes the accompanying changes in medical education in the United States. This book was substantially revised and the revised version was released in 1993 under the title of From Humors to Medical Science. Reviews of the book shortly after publication stated that Duffy's book was the most comprehensive historical account of medicine in the United States published up to that time.

Duffy authored a significant number of scholarly journal articles. These included such subjects as: the history of medicine among Native Americans, public health for school children including the history of vaccination programs, the public health impact of cholera and smallpox epidemics, the personal and societal impacts of masturbation and clitoridectomy, and medical ethics.

=== Awards and honors ===
In 1991 the American Association for the History of Medicine gave Duffy its Lifetime Achievement Award for the History of Medicine.

Duffy received the Literary Award of the Louisiana Library Association for the first volume of his two volume series, the Rudolph Matas History of Medicine in Louisiana.

Duffy was a University Fellow at UCLA in 1945–1946 and a Ford Fellow at Harvard University in 1951–1952. He was the Distinguished Alumnus of Northwestern State University in 1986. He also served for a time as president of the American Association for the History of Medicine and also the Washington Society for the History of Medicine.

== Death ==
Duffy died at his home in Baton Rouge, Louisiana, on June 20, 1996, where he had been living for the last nine years of his life. At the time of his death, Duffy had retained his status as emeritus professor at the University of Maryland and at Tulane University. At the time of his death, he was working on a review of the careers of female physicians in Louisiana.

== Representative publications ==
=== Books ===
- Duffy, J. (1958). The Rudolph Matas history of medicine in Louisiana. vol 1. Louisiana: Louisiana State University Press for the Rudolph Matas Trust Fund.
- Duffy, J. (1962). The Rudolph Matas history of medicine in Louisiana. vol 2. 2. Louisiana: Louisiana State University Press for the Rudolph Matas Trust Fund.
- Duffy, J. (1966). Sword of Pestilence: The New Orleans Yellow Fever Epidemic of 1853: Louisiana State University Press.
- Duffy, J. (1968). A history of public health in New York City. New York: Russell Sage Foundation.
- Duffy, J. (1972). Epidemics in Colonial America: Kennikat Press.
- Duffy, J. (1974). A history of public health in New York City, 1866–1966. New York: Russell Sage Foundation.
- Duffy, J. (1976). The healers : the rise of the medical establishment. New York: McGraw-Hill.
- Duffy, J. (1984). The Tulane University Medical Center : 150 years of medical education. Baton Rouge: Louisiana State University Press.
- Duffy, J. (1990). The sanitarians : a history of American public health. Urbana: University of Illinois Press.
- Duffy, J. (1993). From humors to medical science : a history of American medicine. Urbana: University of Illinois Press.

=== Journal articles ===
- Duffy, John. “The Passage to the Colonies.” The Mississippi Valley Historical Review, vol. 38, no. 1, [Organization of American Historians, Oxford University Press], 1951, pp. 21–38, doi:10.2307/1898250.
- Duffy, John. “Smallpox and the Indians in the American Colonies.” Bulletin of the History of Medicine, vol. 25, no. 4, The Johns Hopkins University Press, 1951, pp. 324–41, http://www.jstor.org/stable/44443622.
- Duffy J. "Masturbation and Clitoridectomy: A Nineteenth-Century View." JAMA. 1963;186(3):246–248. doi:10.1001/jama.1963.63710030028012
- Duffy, John, "School Vaccination: The Precursor to School Medical Inspection", Journal of the History of Medicine and Allied Sciences, Volume XXXIII, Issue 3, July 1978, Pages 344–355, doi:10.1093/jhmas/XXXIII.3.344
- Duffy, J. (1983) "American Medical Ethics and the Physician-Patient Relationship." In: Shelp E.E. (eds.) The Clinical Encounter. Philosophy and Medicine, vol 14. Springer, Dordrecht. doi:10.1007/978-94-009-7148-6_3
- Duffy, John. “Health, Sanitation, and Foodways in Historical Archaeology: Commentary.” Historical Archaeology, vol. 27, no. 2, Society for Historical Archaeology, 1993, pp. 2–5, http://www.jstor.org/stable/25616235.
- Duffy, John. “Yellow Fever and Public Health in the New South.” ISIS: Journal of the History of Science in Society, vol. 86, no. 1, Mar. 1995, pp. 117–118. EBSCOhost, doi:10.1086/357121

== See also ==
- History of public health in the United States
