= John Chynoweth Burnham =

American historian

John C. Burnham
- Born: John Chynoweth Burnham; July 14, 1929; Boulder, Colorado
- Died: May 12, 2017 (aged 87); Columbus, Ohio
- Education: Stanford University; University of Wisconsin–Madison
- Known for: History of medicine History of science
- Spouse: Marjorie Spencer Burnham
- Children: 4
- Scientific career
- Fields: History
- Thesis: Psychoanalysis in American Civilization Before 1918 (1958)

John Chynoweth Burnham (July 14, 1929 – May 12, 2017) was an American historian who was a professor of history at Ohio State University from 1963 to 2002. He was an expert on the history of science, medicine, psychology, and psychiatry. He served as president of the American Association for the History of Medicine from 1990 to 1992, and as editor-in-chief of the Journal of the History of the Behavioral Sciences from 1997 to 2000. He was a fellow of the American Psychological Association and the American Association for the Advancement of Science. He also received the Lifetime Achievement Award from Division 26 of the American Psychological Association.
