= Guenter B. Risse =

Argentine-born American medical historian (1932–2026)

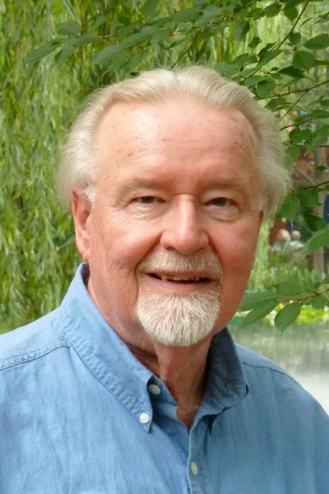
- Risse in 2010
- Born: April 28, 1932; Buenos Aires, Argentina
- Died: February 15, 2026 (aged 93)
- Education: Colegio Nacional; University of Buenos Aires; University of Chicago
- Scientific career
- Fields: History of medicine
- Workplaces: University of Minnesota; University of Wisconsin–Madison; University of California, San Francisco; University of California, Berkeley

Guenter Bernhard Risse (April 28, 1932 – February 15, 2026) was an American medical historian. He wrote numerous books, including "Driven by Fear: Epidemics and Isolation in San Francisco's House of Pestilence." The American Association for the History of Medicine awarded him the 1988 William H. Welch Medal for his book Hospital Life in Enlightenment Scotland and its Lifetime Achievement Award in 2005. He was Professor Emeritus, Department of Anthropology, History and Social Medicine, at the University of California, San Francisco, and later Affiliate Professor of Bioethics and Humanities at the University of Washington in Seattle.

== Education ==
Risse was a native of Buenos Aires, Argentina, where he obtained his baccalaureate degree from the Colegio Nacional in 1951 prior to gaining admission to the University of Buenos Aires School of Medicine. Following graduation with a magna cum laude M.D. in 1958, he came to the US to complete an internship and training in internal medicine.

In 1962, Risse returned to the classroom, following admission to the University of Chicago. Originally enrolled at the Oriental Institute, he studied ancient Egyptian culture and language under the direction of the distinguished Egyptologist John Wilson. A 1965 plan to participate in an excavation project in Saqqara near the suspected tomb of Imhotep, the ancient god of healing, was not approved by the Egypt Exploration Fund because the dig was restricted to trained archeologists. Such an outcome and shifts in excavation plans following UNESCO's call to save Nubian monuments from the impending flooding caused by the new Aswan Dam, induced him to transfer to the History Department. Here he worked under Professors Allen G. Debus and Lester S. King, obtaining his Ph.D. in 1971. His dissertation dealt with eighteenth-century medical systems, notably the theories of the Scottish physician John Brown and their impact in Germany during the early 1800s.

== Career ==
Risse held academic appointments at the University of Chicago (1963–1967), University of Minnesota (1969–1971), University of Wisconsin–Madison (1972–1985), and University of California San Francisco, and Berkeley, (1985–2001). As chair he developed the Department of the History of Medicine in University of Wisconsin–Madison during the early 1970s. In 1985 he reorganized the Department of the History of Health Sciences in San Francisco. He was a member of the American Association for the History of Medicine, History of Science Society, European Association for the History of Health and Medicine, also holding corresponding memberships in several European and Latin American societies; he was also elected to the now defunct International Academy of Medicine in 1977. A fellowship from the World Health Organization in 1979 allowed him to study the history of Latin America's health care systems. As part of this project, he established close relationships with the Sociedad Mexicana de Historia y Filosofia in the early 1980s. In addition, Risse was a fellow at the Institute for Advanced Studies at the University of Edinburgh in 1986 and the Sir Logan Campbell Distinguished Visitor at the University of Auckland School of Medicine in 1994. He was active in the creation of the European Association for the History of Health and Medicine and co-sponsored the establishment of the International Network for the History of Hospitals. He was also a past president of the American Association for the History of Medicine (1988–1990).

== Death ==
Risse died on February 15, 2026, at the age of 93.

== Bibliography ==
- Editor and contributor, Modern China and Traditional Chinese Medicine, Springfield: C. Thomas, 1973.
- Editor and translator, History of Physiology, by K. E. Rothschuh, Huntington: R. E. Krieger, 1973 and 1981.
- Edited with R. L. Numbers, and J. W. Leavitt, Medicine Without Doctors: Home Health Care in American History, New York: Science History Publications, 1977.
- Hospital Life in Enlightenment Scotland: Care and Teaching at the Royal Infirmary of Edinburgh. New York: Cambridge University Press, 1986.
- Edited with Victoria A. Harden, AIDS and the Historian: Proceedings of a Conference at the National Institutes of Health 20–21 March 1989, Bethesda: N.I.H. Publications, 1991.
- Edited with Robert Jütte and John Woodward, Culture, Knowledge and Healing: Historical Perspectives of Homeopathic Medicine in Europe and North America, Sheffield: European Ass. for the History of Medicine and Health Publ., 1998.
- Mending Bodies—Saving Souls: A History of Hospitals, New York: Oxford University Press, 1999.
- New Medical Challenges During the Scottish Enlightenment, Amsterdam: Rodopi, 2005. (Clio Medica 78)
- Plague, Fear and Politics in San Francisco's Chinatown, Baltimore: Johns Hopkins University Press, 2012.
- Driven by Fear: Epidemics and Isolation in San Francisco's House of Pestilence, University of Illinois Press; 1 edition (December 30, 2015).
