= Julie Livingston =

American medical historian

- Born: 1966 (age 59–60)
- Education: Tufts University; Boston University; Emory University
- Awards: MacArthur Fellowship; William H. Welch Medal (2014)
- Scientific career
- Fields: medical historian
- Workplaces: New York University; Rutgers University

Julie Livingston (born 1966) is an American medical historian and the Julius Silver Professor at New York University. She won a 2013 MacArthur Fellowship.

== Life ==
Livingston received her B.A. in Comparative Religion from Tufts University. She graduated from Boston University with an M.A. in African History, M.P.H. in Health Services and a Certificate of Public Health in Developing Countries, and from Emory University with a Ph.D. in African History. She taught at Rutgers University from 2003 to 2015.

== Publications ==
Select books:

- Debility and moral imagination in Botswana : disability, chronic illness, and aging, 2005
- Improvising medicine : an African oncology ward in an emerging cancer epidemic, 2012
- Self-devouring growth : a planetary parable as told from Southern Africa, 2019
- Cars and Jails: Freedom Dreams, Debt, and Carcerality (co-authored with Andrew Ross), 2022
