= Erwin Ackerknecht =

American historian

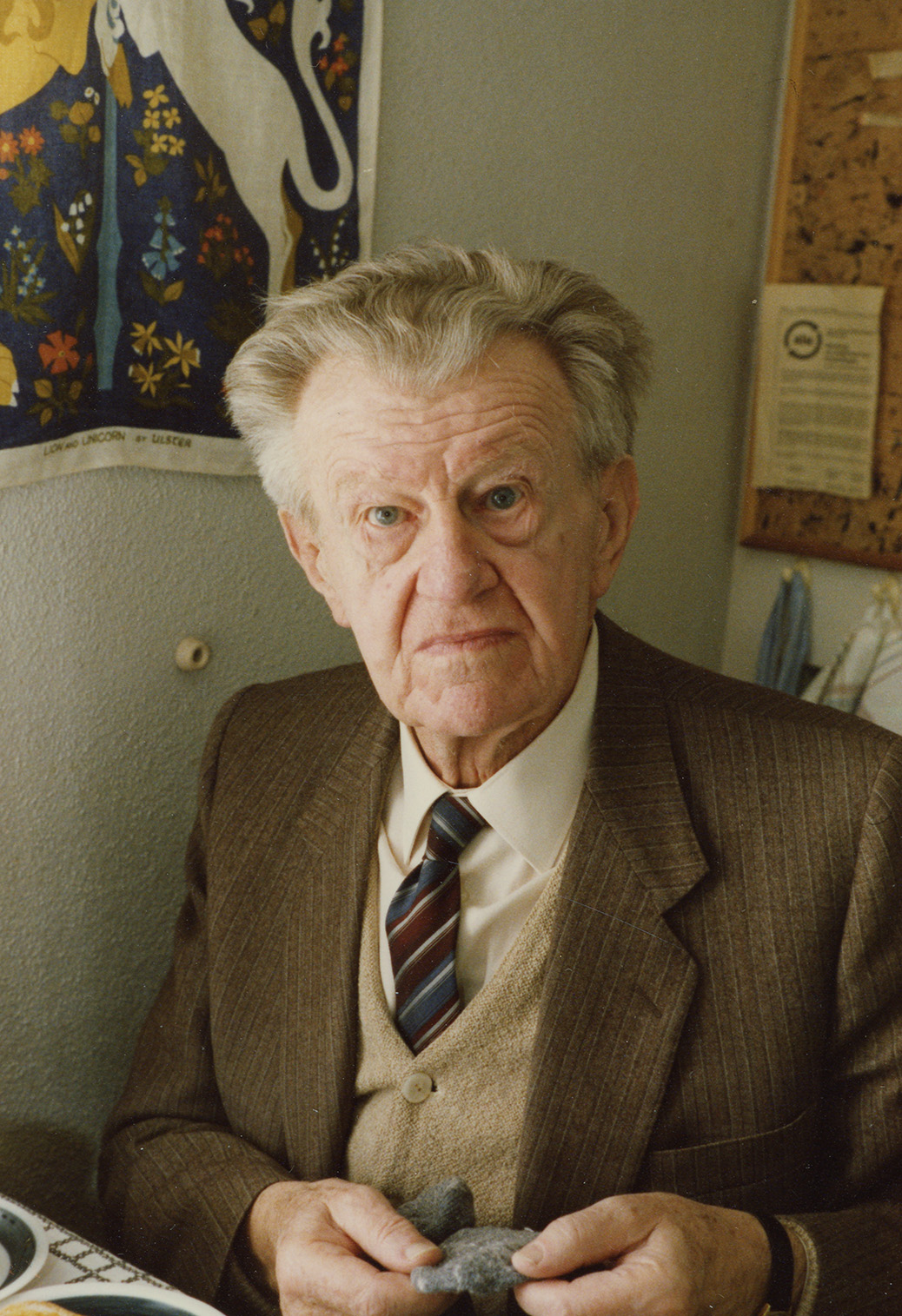
Erwin H. Ackerknecht, 1987

Erwin Heinz Ackerknecht (1 June 1906 – 18 November 1988) was an active and influential Trotskyist in the 1930s who had to flee Germany in 1933 after Hitler’s rise to power. It was in the United States, the country that granted him citizenship, that Ackerknecht became an influential historian of medicine. He wrote groundbreaking works on the social and ecological dimensions of disease and was a forerunner of contemporary trends in social and cultural history. He became the first chair in the history of medicine at the University of Wisconsin; the second such position in the United States.

== Biography ==
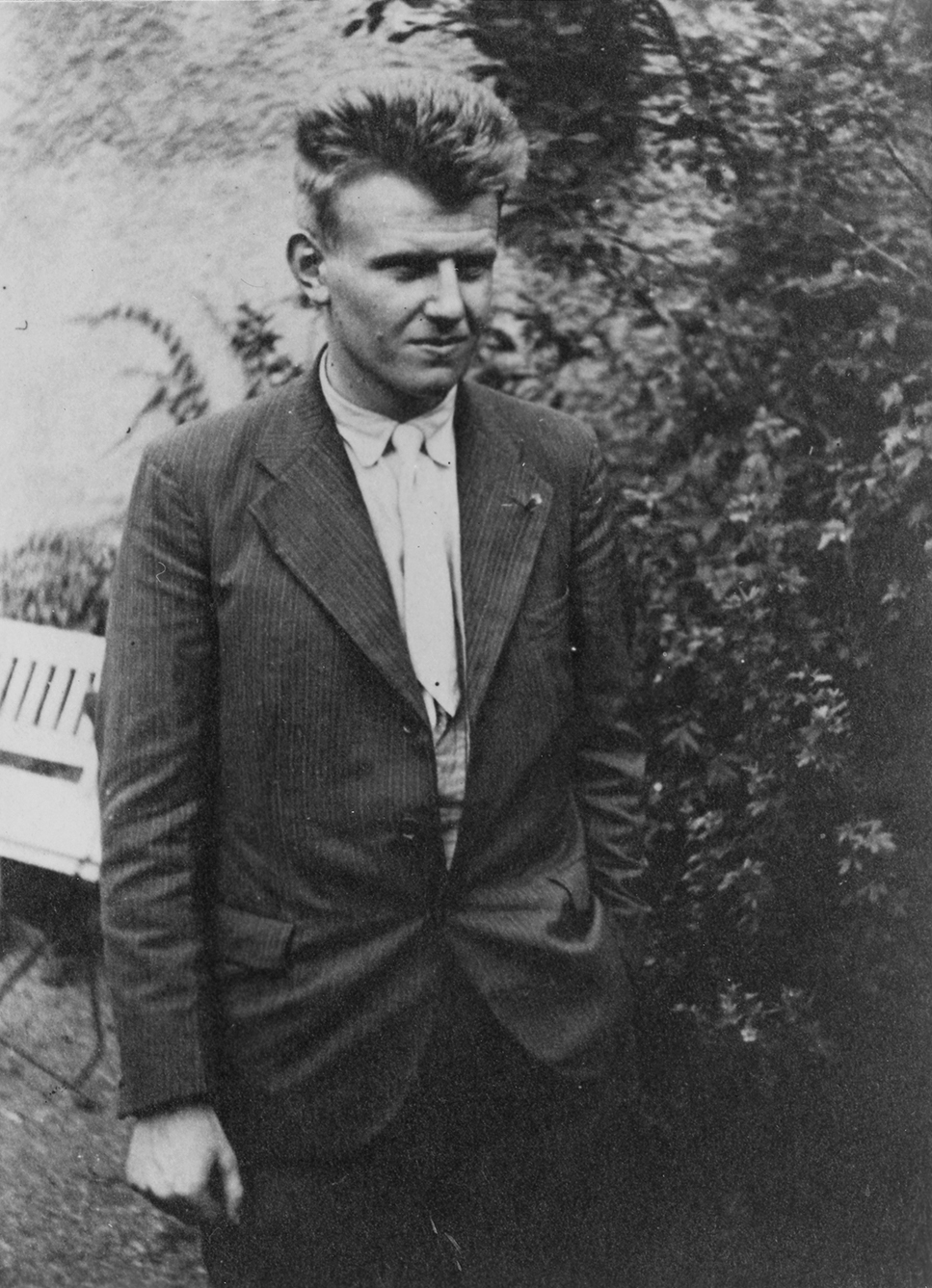
Erwin H. Ackerknecht, 1931

Erwin Heinz Ackerknecht was born in Stettin, now called Szczecin. His father, Dr. Erwin Julius Ackerknecht, was a renowned librarian, author, literary critic and professor of literary history. He studied medicine (and sporadically economics, history of literature and arts) eventually graduating from the University of Leipzig in 1931 with a dissertation on a study of German medical reform in 1848. Throughout his studies Ackerknecht was affiliated with communist student groups in Freiburg, Berlin and Vienna; in 1926 he joined the KJVT (Kommunistischer Jugendverband Deutschlands; Communist Youth Federation of Germany) and then the KPD (Kommunistische Partei Deutschlands; Communist Party of Germany). As a student he was known as the leader of the KoStyFra (Kommunistische Studentenfraktion; Communist Student's Fraction). Together with Robert Soblen and Otto Schüssler he founded in 1928 a small oppositional group at Leipzig called the Bolschewistische Einheit (Bolshevik Unity). He was also affiliated with the Lenin League. In March 1934, Ackerknecht became one of the founding members of the United Left Opposition. Meanwhile, he was expelled from the KPD. After having moved from Leipzig to Berlin, he became a member of the 'political committee' of the Left Opposition of the KPD, the "Bolshevists-Leninists, the official German branch of the International Left Opposition led by Leon Trotsky and his son Lev Sedov. Ackerknecht closely co-operated with Sedov, Grylewicz and other prominent activists of the Trotskyist movement and became a co-editor and staff writer of the LO using the pseudonym Bauer.

When the Nazis seized power in Germany, Ackerknecht, now one of the central figures of German Trotskyism, went underground. He fled Germany in June 1933, spent a short time in Czechoslovakia and paid a visit to Leon Trotsky in exile in Turkey. He eventually broke with Trotskyism and Marxism and turned his back to political activism. However, his opposition against Nazism and right wing politics of all kinds remained unrelenting. While in exile in Paris he earned his living as a translator and began to study ethnography at the Musée de l'Homme with Marcel Mauss, Lucien Lévy-Bruhl, and Paul Rivet. He graduated from the Sorbonne shortly before the outbreak of World War II. He joined the French army and eventually fled to southern France where he waited for several months for his American visa. He arrived in New York City in July 1941 together with his second wife.

He was first employed as a fellow in the history of medicine at Johns Hopkins University while working as assistant curator at the American Museum of Natural History. He was then offered a position as the University of Wisconsin's first chair in the history of medicine. His A short history of medicine, was published in 1955 but the most active years of his academic life was when he moved to the University of Zurich (Switzerland), a position he kept until his retirement in 1971.

He died in Zurich in 1988.

== Work ==
His most influential work was published in the 1940s and 1960s. His major contributions, namely on ethnomedicine, on the reconstruction of the Paris Clinical School, on the ecologically oriented study of nineteenth-century malaria, on a 'behavioral' approach to medical history, on the generally neglected history of therapeutics, and situating medical knowledge in a broad context, have become so intellectually assimilated that they have become 'invisible'.

== Bibliography ==
- Malaria in the upper Mississippi Valley, 1760–1900, Supplements to the Bulletin of the History of Medicine; No. 4. Baltimore: The Johns Hopkins Press, 1945.
- History and Geography of the Most Important Diseases, New York: Hafner Pub. Co., 1965.
- Medicine at the Paris Hospital, 1794–1848, Baltimore: Johns Hopkins Press, 1967.
- A Short History of Psychiatry, 2nd ed. New York: Hafner Pub. Co., 1968.
- Medicine and Ethnology: Selected Essays. Baltimore: Johns Hopkins Press, 1971.
- Therapeutics from the primitives to the 20th century (with an appendix: History of dietetics). New York: Hafner Press, 1973.
- Rudolf Virchow. The Development of Science. New York: Arno Press, 1981.
- A Short History of Medicine. Baltimore: Johns Hopkins University Press, 1982.
