= Society for History in the Federal Government =

The Society for History in the Federal Government (SHFG) is a private non-profit organization established in 1979 to promote an understanding of the history of the federal government in the United States and to represent historians serving in the agencies of the U.S. Federal Government.

The SHFG was founded in 1979. Its members are historians, archivists, curators, librarians, editors, and preservationists. Most members are U.S. federal employees. Jack M. Holl served as president of the SHFG from 1979 to 1980.

The Society has annual meetings, awards prizes, and has publications.
