= Lester S. King =

American pathologist (1908 – 2002)

Lester Snow King, M.D. (April 18, 1908 – October 6, 2002) was an American pathologist, medical editor, medical journalist, and medical historian.

== Biography ==
Lester S. King was born in a Jewish family in Cambridge, Massachusetts, where his father, Myron L. King, M.D., was a general practitioner. Lester S. King studied philosophy at Harvard College, where he graduated at age 19 with a bachelor's degree. At Harvard Medical School, he graduated in 1932 with a medical degree and after graduation was a Workman Fellow in anatomy. In December 1931 he married Marjorie Meehan, who was a medical student at the Johns Hopkins School of Medicine. In the summer of 1935 he completed two papers written in collaboration with Raymond Alexander Kelser. Lester and Marjorie King had two children Alfred (b. 1933) and Frances (b. 1935). King with his family spent 15 months from the autumn of 1935 to the end of 1936 in Madrid and London. They were from 1935 to 1936 in Madrid, where he studied silver-staining techniques and neuroanatomy under the supervision of Pío del Río-Hortega. King and his family left Spain in March 1936, a few months before the outbreak of the Spanish Civil War. After leaving Madrid, he did research on demyelinating diseases at the National Hospital for Neurology and Neurosurgery in Queen Square, London.

King completed his medical residency at the Rockefeller Institute for Medical Research, where he worked until 1939. From 1940 to the beginning of 1942 he worked as a pathologist at a Yale-affiliated Connecticut hospital and also taught pathology at Yale Medical School. At the entry of the USA into WW II, King volunteered for the U.S. Army and was sent to El Paso, Texas, where he worked as a pathologist at the William Beaumont General Hospital. He attained the rank of major. At the end of WW II in 1945, he moved with his family to Chicago. There he was a staff pathologist at Advocate Illinois Masonic Medical Center, an affiliate of the Chicago branch of the University of Illinois College of Medicine, where he was a professor until 1964. He resigned as a staff pathologist in 1963. His first book The Medical World of the Eighteenth Century was published in 1958.

At the Journal of the American Medical Association, King was a senior editor from 1963 to 1973 and a contributing editor from 1973 to 1978. He was a lecturer in the history department of the University of Chicago from 1967 until near the end of the 1980s. He was a book collector and donated more than 200 historical medical books to the University of Chicago Library.

Toward the end of his life he lived in the Hallmark Retirement Community, located at 2960 N. Lake Shore Drive, immediately to the north of Lincoln Park in Chicago. At his retirement home, he lectured regularly on many subjects, including art and literature. He was predeceased by his wife. Upon his death he was survived by his son and daughter, three grandchildren, and five great-grandchildren.

== Awards and honors ==
Lester King received in 1964 the Boerhaave Medal from Leiden University and in 1977 the William H. Welch Medal from the American Association for the History of Medicine (AAHM). In 1975 he delivered the AAHM's Garrison Lecture (named in honor of Fielding Hudson Garrison). In 1988 King became the first recipient of the AAHM's Lifetime Achievement Award.

== Selected publications ==
=== Articles ===
- King, Lester S. (1936). "Hereditary defects of the corpus callosum in the mouse, Mus muscles". Journal of Comparative Neurology. 64 (2): 337–363. doi:10.1002/cne.900640210.
- King, Lester S. (1939). "The Hematoencephalic Barrier". Archives of Neurology and Psychiatry. 41: 51. doi:10.1001/archneurpsyc.1939.02270130061003.
- King, Lester S. (1939). "Encephalopathy Following Injections of Bone Marrow Extract". Journal of Experimental Medicine. 70 (3): 303–314. doi:10.1084/jem.70.3.303. PMC 2133817. PMID 19870911.
- King, L. S. (1939). "Moose encephalitis". The American Journal of Pathology. 15 (4): 445–454.3. PMC 1965045. PMID 19970460.
- King, L. S. (1940). "Primary encephalomyelitis in goats associated with Listerella infection". The American Journal of Pathology. 16 (4): 467–478.5. PMC 1965106. PMID 19970517.
- Sullivan, Maurice; King, Lester S. (1947). "Effects of Resin of Podophyllum on Normal Skin, Condylomata Acuminata and Verrucae Vulgares". Archives of Dermatology. 56 (1): 30–47. doi:10.1001/archderm.1947.01520070033004. PMID 20251557.
- King, L. S. (1947). "Mummified Epidermal Cysts: (So-Called "Calcified Epitheliomas")". The American Journal of Pathology. 23 (1): 29–41. PMC 1934216. PMID 19970918.
- King, L. S. (1948). "Atypical Amyloid Disease, with Observations on a New Silver Stain for Amyloid". The American Journal of Pathology. 24 (5): 1095–1115. PMC 1942755. PMID 18883956. 1948
- King LS; Cox TR (1951). "Lymphosarcoma of the prostate". The American Journal of Pathology. 27 (5): 801–823. PMC 1937277. PMID 14868762.
- King, Lester S. (1952). "Dr. Koch's Postulates". Journal of the History of Medicine and Allied Sciences. 7 (4): 350–361. doi:10.1093/jhmas/VII.4.350. JSTOR 24620063. PMID 12990783. (See Koch's postulates.)
- King, Lester S. (1954). "What is disease?". Philosophy of Science. 21 (3): 193–203. doi:10.1086/287343.
- King, Lester S. (1961). "The Blood-Letting Controversy: A Study in the Scientific Method". Bulletin of the History of Medicine. 35 (1): 1–13. JSTOR 44446760. PMID 13756092. (See bloodletting.)
- King, Lester S. (1964). "Empiricism, Rationalism, and Diabetes". JAMA. 187 (7): 521–526. doi:10.1001/jama.1964.03060200053010. PMID 14149977. (See diabetes.)
- King, Lester S. (1966). "Boissier de Sauvages and 18th Century Nosology". Bulletin of the History of Medicine. 40 (1): 43–51. JSTOR 44447125. PMID 5325019. (See François Boissier de Sauvages de Lacroix and nosology.)
- King, Lester S. (1967). "What is a Diagnosis?". JAMA: The Journal of the American Medical Association. 202 (8): 714–717. doi:10.1001/jama.1967.03130210088015. PMID 6072514.
- King, Lester S. (1968). "Signs and Symptoms". JAMA: The Journal of the American Medical Association. 206 (5): 1063–1065. doi:10.1001/jama.1968.03150050051011. PMID 4877912. (See signs and symptoms.)
- King, Lester S. (1970). "Empiricism and Rationalism in the Works of Thomas Sydenham". Bulletin of the History of Medicine. 44 (1): 1–11. JSTOR 44447422. PMID 4909172. (See Thomas Sydenham.)
- King, L. S.; Meehan, M. C. (1973). "A history of the autopsy. A review". The American Journal of Pathology. 73 (2): 514–544. PMC 1904067. PMID 4586127.
- King, Lester S. (1974). "George Cheyne, mirror of eighteenth century medicine". Bulletin of the History of Medicine. 48 (4): 517–539. JSTOR 44450166. (See George Cheyne (physician).)
- King, Lester S. (1975). "The Humanization of Medicine". JAMA: The Journal of the American Medical Association. 231 (7): 738–739. doi:10.1001/jama.1975.03240190042018. PMID 1172868.
- King, Lester S. (1978). The Philosophy of Medicine. doi:10.4159/harvard.9780674182165. ISBN 978-0-674-18215-8.
- King, Lester S. (1984). "XX. The Flexner Report of 1910". JAMA: The Journal of the American Medical Association. 251 (8): 1079. doi:10.1001/jama.1984.03340320057029. (See Flexner Report.)
- King, Lester S. (1984). "XXI. Medical Practice: Specialization". JAMA: The Journal of the American Medical Association. 251 (10): 1333. doi:10.1001/jama.1984.03340340061030.

=== Books and monographs ===
- King, Lester S. (1958). The medical world of the eighteenth century. Chicago: University of Chicago Press. LCCN 58007332.
- King, Lester S. (1963). The growth of medical thought. Chicago: University of Chicago Press. LCCN 63009729.
- King, Lester S.; Roland, Charles G. (1968). Scientific writing. based on a series of articles published in the Journal of the American Medical Association, with corrections and supplemental illustrative material. Chicago: American Medical Association. LCCN 73005812.
- Bodemer, Charles W.; King, Lester S. (1968). Medical investigation in seventeenth century England. Los Angeles: William Andrews Clark Memorial Library, University of California at Los Angeles. ASIN B000LRCMQW. LCCN 76626038.
- King, Lester S. (1970). Road to medical enlightenment, 1650-1695. London, Macdonald & Co.; New York, American Elsevier. ISBN 0444196854. LCCN 79111293.
- King, Lester S. (1978). Why not say it clearly: a guide to expository writing (1st ed.). Boston: Little, Brown. ISBN 0316493465. LCCN 78069907.
  - King, Lester S. (1991). Why not say it clearly: a guide to expository writing (2nd ed.). Boston: Little, Brown. ISBN 0316493538. LCCN 91060017.
- King, Lester S. King, ed. (1971). Mainstreams of medicine; essays on the social and intellectual context of medical practice. introduction by David A. Kronick. Austin, Texas: The University of Texas Press. ISBN 0292701128. LCCN 78149564.
- Hoffmann, Friedrich (1971). Fundamenta medicinae. translated from the Latin and introduced by Lester S. King. London, MacDonald & Co.; New York, American Elsevier. LCCN 74132639.
- King, Lester S., ed. (1971). History of medicine; selected readings. Harmondsworth, England: Penguin Books. ISBN 0140802207. LCCN 74030461.
- King, Lester S. (1978). Philosophy of medicine: the early eighteenth century. Cambridge, Massachusetts: Harvard University Press. ISBN 0674665856. LCCN 77024645.
- King, Lester S. (1982). Medical thinking: a historical preface. Princeton, N.J.: Princeton University Press. LCCN 81011965.
  - King, Lester Snow (2014). Medical Thinking: A Historical Preface. Princeton University Press. ISBN 978-1-4008-5568-1.
- King, Lester S. (1984). American medicine comes of age, 1840-1920: essays to commemorate the founding of the Journal of the American Medical Association on July 14, 1883. Series of essays ran for 24 consecutive months from July 1982 to June 1984. Chicago, Illinois: AMA. ISBN 0899701779. LCCN 84210446.
- King, Lester S. (1991). Transformations in American medicine: from Benjamin Rush to William Osler. Baltimore: Johns Hopkins University Press. ISBN 0801840570. LCCN 90004662.
