= Emily Abel =

Public health and medical historian

Emily K. Abel is a public health and medical historian, author and professor emerita at the UCLA Fielding School of Public Health where she was a Professor of Health Services and Women’s Studies.

Abel earned a B.A. from Swarthmore College, M.A. in history from Columbia University, her Ph.D. in history from the University of London, and her M.P.H. from the UCLA School of Public Health.

== Publications ==
- Hearts of Wisdom: American Women Caring for Kin, 1850-1940 (Harvard University Press, 2000)ISBN 978-0-674-00314-9
  - Named a Choice Outstanding Academic Book for 2000
- Suffering in the Land of Sunshine: A Los Angeles Illness Narrative (Rutgers University Press, 2006) ISBN 978-0-8135-3901-0
- Tuberculosis and the Politics of Exclusion: A History of Public Health and Migration to Los Angeles (Rutgers University Press, 2007) ISBN 978-0-8135-4175-4
  - Won the Viseltear Prize of the Medical Section of the American Public Health Association for an outstanding book in the history of public health.
- After the Cure: Untold Stories of Breast Cancer Survivors (NYU Press, 2008), co-written with Saskia Subramanian. ISBN 978-0-8147-0725-8
- The Inevitable Hour: A History of Caring for Dying Patients in America (Johns Hopskins University Press, 2013)
- Prelude to Hospice: Florence Wald, Dying People, and Their Families (Rutgers University Press, 2018)
- Sick and Tired: An Intimate History of Fatigue (University of North Carolina Press, 2021)
