= Medical service corps =

A medical service corps is a kind of military corps found in branches of the United States Armed Forces that is formally designated to engage in supporting and administrating the provision of medical assistance to soldiers and their families, and to civilians in emergency situations. These include the United States Air Force Medical Service Corps, which is a branch of the Air Force Medical Service; the United States Navy Medical Service Corps, which is a staff corps of the Navy Bureau of Medicine and Surgery (BUMED), and the United States Army Medical Service Corps, which is a branch of the Army Medical Department. In each branch, the Medical Service Corps is distinct from a medical corps. The focus of the Medical Service Corps is on matters such as logistics and supply, support, and administration, and the provision of services like lab testing, pharmacy, and environmental science, and of medical specialties such as psychology and optometry.
