= Gerald N. Grob =

American mental health historian (1931–2015)

- Gerald N. Grob
- Born: April 25, 1931; New York
- Died: December 16, 2015 (aged 84); Evergreen, Colorado
- Occupation: Historian

Gerald N. Grob (1931-2015) was a prominent historian of American mental health care policy and medicine.

== Biography ==
Born on April 25, 1931, in New York to Jewish immigrants who fled Poland, Grob's upbringing during the Great Depression influenced his commitment to FDR's New Deal ideals. A distinguished academic, he authored seminal works on the treatment of the mentally ill and later shifted his focus to the history of disease patterns in America. Grob's legacy extends beyond his scholarship, as he was also recognized for his mentoring, teaching, and contributions to charitable organizations. Grob died on December 16, 2015, at the age of 84 due to liver failure.

== Publications ==
- Workers in Utopia: A Study of Ideological Conflict in the American Labor Movement: 1856-1900, Northwestern University Press (Chicago, IL), 1961.
- American Ideas: Source Readings in the Intellectual History of the United States, two volumes, Free Press (New York, NY), 1963.
- The State and the Mentally Ill: A History of Worcester State Hospital in Massachusetts, 1830-1920, University of North Carolina Press (Chapel Hill, NC), 1966.
- Interpretations of American History, two volumes, Free Press (New York, NY), 1967, 6th edition, 1992.
- Statesmen and Statescraft of the Modern West: Essays in Honor of Dwight E. Lee and H. Donaldson Jordon, Barre-Westover (Barre, MA), 1967.
- American Social History before 1860, Appleton (New York, NY), 1970.
- Insanity and Idiocy in Massachusetts: Report of the Commission on Lunacy, 1855, by Edward Jarvis, Harvard University Press (Cambridge, MA), 1971.
- Mental Institutions in America: Social Policy to 1875, Free Press (New York, NY), 1973.
- Edward Jarvis and the Medical World of Nineteenth-Century America, University of Tennessee Press (Knoxville, TN), 1978.
- Mental Illness and American Society, 1875-1940, Princeton University Press (Princeton, NJ), 1983.
- The Inner World of American Psychiatry, 1890-1940, Rutgers University Press (New Brunswick, NJ), 1985.
- From Asylum to Community: Mental Health Policy in Modern America, Princeton University Press (Princeton, NJ), 1991.
- The Mad among Us: A History of the Care of America's Mentally Ill, Free Press (New York, NY), 1994.
- The Deadly Truth: A History of Disease in America, Harvard University Press (Cambridge, MA), 2002.
