= John Parascandola =

American medical historian (born 1941)

- Born: July 14, 1941; New York, New York
- Died: November 30, 2024 (age 83); Bethesda, Maryland
- Citizenship: American
- Education: Brooklyn College; University of Wisconsin - Madison
- Awards: Sidney M. Edelstein Award for Outstanding Achievement in the History of Chemistry
- Scientific career
- Fields: History of medicine

John Parascandola (born John Louis Parascandola, July 14, 1941 – November 30, 2024) was an American medical historian. He wrote numerous books, including The Development of American Pharmacology: John J. Abel and the Shaping of a Discipline, and held the position of Public Health Service Historian.

== Education ==
Parascandola received his Bachelor's Degree in Chemistry from Brooklyn College before receiving his Master's Degree in Biochemistry and his PhD in the History of Science in 1968 at the University of Wisconsin - Madison. Parascandola did post-doctoral work at Harvard University.

== Career ==
Parascandola's career began in 1974 as Director of the American Institute of the History of Pharmacy, where he remained until 1981. In 1983, Parascandola became Chief of the History of Medicine Division of the United States National Library of Medicine. In 1992, he became Public Health Service Historian, which he held until his retirement in 2004. He taught at the University of Wisconsin–Madison and taught at the University of Maryland. He taught classes on topics such as Mummies and Mad Doctors in Film and Literature until his death in 2024.

== Writings ==
Parascandola's two most recognized books were The Development of American Pharmacology: John J. Abel and the Shaping of a Discipline, which was written in 1992 and received the 1994 George Urdang Medal, and Sex, Sin, and Science: A History of Syphilis in America, which was released in 2008 and won the George Pendleton Prize for 2009.

== Awards ==
Parascandola was the recipient of several awards, including the Surgeon General’s Exemplary Service Award, the Assistant Secretary for Health’s Superior Service Award, the National Institute of Health Merit Award, and the Surgeon General's Medallion. In 2002, he received the Sidney M. Edelstein Award for Outstanding Achievement in the History of Chemistry from the American Chemical Society.

== Death ==
Parascandola suffered from recurring lymphoma. He succumbed to the cause in his home in Bethesda, Maryland, on November 30, 2024, aged 83.
