= Bulletin of the History of Medicine =

- Discipline: History of medicine
- Language: English
- Edited by: Randall M. Packard, Mary E. Fissell

Publication details
- Former name(s): Bulletin of the Institute of the History of Medicine
- History: 1939–present
- Publisher: Johns Hopkins University Press (United States)
- Frequency: Quarterly

Standard abbreviations
- ISO 4: Bull. Hist. Med.

Indexing
- ISSN: 0007-5140 (print); 1086-3176 (web)
- OCLC no.: 33891126

Links
- Journal homepage; Online access at Project MUSE

The Bulletin of the History of Medicine is a quarterly peer-reviewed academic journal established in 1933. It is an official publication of the American Association for the History of Medicine and of the Johns Hopkins Institute of the History of Medicine. The journal covers social, emotional, cultural, and scientific aspects of the history of medicine and includes critical reviews of recent literature in the field.
