= American Association for the History of Medicine =

American professional association

- Abbreviation: AAHM
- Formation: 1925
- Type: Medical association
- Members: greater than 1000
- Website: histmed.org

The American Association for the History of Medicine is an American professional association dedicated to the study of medical history. The AAHM is the largest society dedicated to medical history in the United States, and the oldest such organization in North America.

== History ==
The American Association for the History of Medicine was established in 1925 as the American Section of the International Society for the History of Medicine. The current name was obtained in 1958. The first president of the association was Fielding Hudson Garrison.Its current membership surpasses 1,000 people.

The AAHM publishes a quarterly journal titled the Bulletin of the History of Medicine. Its current membership surpasses 1,000 people.

The AAHM awards the Genevieve Miller Lifetime Achievement Award annually since 1988, when it was then known as the AAHM Lifetime Achievement Award.

== See also ==
- William H. Welch Medal
