= History of nursing in the United Kingdom =

Growth and professionalisation of nursing in the United Kingdom

The history of nursing in the United Kingdom describes the development of nursing from an unregulated and low-paid occupation into a regulated, graduate profession. Developing from a tradition of monastic infirmaries, nursing as a profession was popularised most in the 19th century by Florence Nightingale, who alongside others sought to introduce a formally trained caring profession to complement medicine. The establishment of the Nightingale Training School at St Thomas’ Hospital in 1860 marked the beginning of organised nursing education in the UK and preceded similar developments across the country. The profession matured throughout the 20th century, with state registration introduced by the Nurses Registration Act 1919 and a royal college established in 1928. The establishment of the National Health Service in 1948 resulted most of hospital nursing moving into the public sector and more standardised approaches to care. Since then there has been a shift towards nursing being a graduate profession; all UK pre-registration nursing programmes being at undergraduate degree level from 2013 with an emphasis on evidence-based practice.

== 19th century ==
Before the advent of training, nursing was often casual and low paid. Pay in London voluntary hospitals was between 6 shillings and 9s 6d a week, with some board and lodging. Outside London, pay was much lower. Few nurses were described as educated. Facilities in hospitals were poor, though some began to provide meals for nurses. The designation sister arose from the ministry of religious sisters, who were recruited separately from nurses and were more respectable, honest and conscientiously devoted to the welfare of patients (which often brought them into conflict with the hospital authorities). Matrons, whose work was largely administrative, were even more so. The Nursing Sisters of St John the Divine (est. 1848) and the All Saints Sisters of the Poor (1851) provided the nursing staff for several of London's largest teaching hospitals, including King's College, Charing Cross and University College Hospitals until close to the end of the century.

Nursing in the Poor Law infirmaries was largely carried out by able-bodied paupers, who were not paid. In 1866 there were a total of 53 nurses employed in the 11 metropolitan workhouses, at an average annual salary of £20 18s (equivalent to 8 shillings per week).

=== Florence Nightingale ===
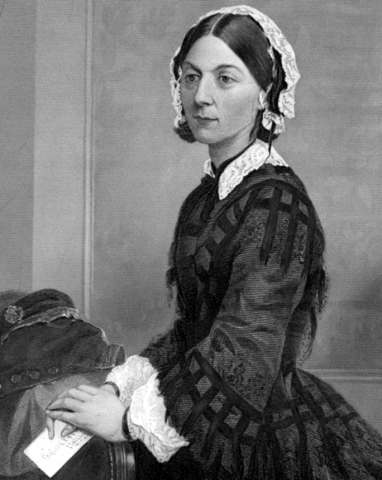
Florence Nightingale

Florence Nightingale (1820-1910) was an English social reformer, statistician and is seen by many as the founder of modern nursing. Nightingale came to prominence while serving as a manager and trainer of nurses during the Crimean War, in which she organised care for wounded soldiers at Constantinople. She significantly reduced death rates by improving hygiene and living standards. In 1860, she laid the foundation of professional nursing with the establishment of her nursing school at St Thomas' Hospital in London. It was the first secular nursing school in the world and led to the development of formalised nurse-training in the UK.

Other women involved in nursing in the Crimea were Betsi Cadwaladr and Mary Seacole.

== 1858–1900 ==
=== Developments in nurse education ===
In 1881 Eva Luckes, Matron of The London Hospital established the first two-year training scheme in London. She instituted a series of lectures by herself, a surgeon and a physician. In 1884 she introduced the precursor to Sister -Tutors, and selected two of her most trusted and skilled hospital sisters to give probationers extra tuition. Before this the nurses home Sisters at St Thomas's Hospital used to lecture probationers from the Nightingale School. In 1895 Luckes introduced the first Preliminary Training School for Nurses in England similar to that established by Rebecca Strong at Glasgow Infirmary in 1893. This became the blueprint for nurses education following the Nurses Registration Act 1919.

=== 1850–1870 ===
- 1858 State registration of the medical professions began, prompting calls for a similar system for nursing
- 1859 Notes on Nursing by Florence Nightingale was published
- 1860 Nightingale School of Nursing was established at St Thomas' Hospital in London.

=== 1870–1900 ===
- 1879 Workhouse Infirmary Nursing Association was created
- 1881 Queen Alexandra's Royal Army Nursing Corps (QARANC) was formed
- 1886 The Hospital (journal; 1886–1924) was launched
- 1887 British Hospitals Association established the first UK register of trained nurses for those who could show that they had worked for at least a year in a hospital or an infirmary and had been trained in the duties of a nurse
- 1887 Queen's Nursing Institute (QNI) was created
- 1887 Royal British Nurses' Association (RBNA) was created by Ethel Gordon Fenwick. It campaigned for the establishment of a register of nurses. It wanted the training to last three years with national standards. They set up a voluntary register in opposition to that of the British Hospitals Association. Princess Helena, one of Queen Victoria's daughters, played a central role in sponsoring and legitimizing the profession. Helena had a firm interest in nursing, and was the first president of the British Nurses' Association
- 1888 Nursing Record, a nursing journal, was launched
- 1889 Queen's Nursing Institute Scotland (QNIS) was formed
- 1894 Matrons' Council for Great Britain and Ireland was established
- 1897 National Association of Workhouse Masters and Matrons was created.

=== Military nursing ===
Nightingale laid the foundations of professional nursing with the principles summarised in the book Notes on Nursing. Her highly publicised exposure of the abysmal care afforded sick and wounded soldiers energized reformers. In 1860 Queen Victoria ordered a hospital to be built to train Army nurses and surgeons. The Royal Victoria Hospital opened in 1863 at Netley and admitted and cared for military patients. Nurses were formally appointed to Military General Hospitals from 1866.

The Army Nursing Service (ANS) oversaw the work of the nurses starting in 1881. These military nurses were sent overseas beginning with the First Boer War (often called Zulu War) from 1879 to 1881. They were also dispatched to serve during the Egyptian Campaign in 1882 and the Sudan War of 1883 to 1884. During the Sudan War members of the Army Nursing Service nursed in hospital ships on the Nile as well as the Citadel in Cairo. Almost 2000 nurses served during the second Boer War, the Anglo-Boer War of 1899 to 1902, alongside nurses who were part of the colonial armies of Australia, Canada and New Zealand. They served in tented field hospitals. 23 Army Nursing sisters from Britain lost their lives from disease outbreaks.

Princess Helena was also President of the Army Nursing Service. Following Queen Victoria's death, Queen Alexandra took over the presidency, but Helena retained presidency of the Army Nursing Reserve.

== 20th century ==
=== 1900–1914 ===
The pressure for state registration grew throughout the 1890s and continued in the pre-War period, but was undermined by disagreements within the profession over the desired form and purpose of the regulatory system. There were six failed attempts between 1904 and 1918, the British parliament passed the bill allowing formal nurse registration. A government committee reported in 1904 setting out a detailed and persuasive case for registration. However, the government sat on the report and took no action. Over the next decade, a number of Private Member's Bills to establish regulation were introduced but all failed to achieve significant support in Parliament.

In 1901 there were 3,170 paid nurses employed in workhouses, with about 2,000 probationers - about one nurse for 20 patients. In total there were about 63,500 female nurses and 5,700 male nurses in England and Wales, working both in institutions and, the majority, in patients homes. The men were almost entirely mental nurses and were not admitted to nurse training schools. Nurses in workhouses were paid about £17 a year. Hospital nurses in 1902 were paid around £19 a year, but the cost of maintenance, laundry, uniforms and accommodation which were provided was around £30 a year. In domiciliary work two guineas a week with meals provided was normal pay, and the work was easier. In hospitals 12-hour days were normal.

- In March 1902, Queen Alexandra’s Imperial Military Nursing Service (QAIMNS) was established, named after Queen Alexandra, who became its President
- 1902 Midwives Act was passed, introducing state regulation of Midwives, prompting calls for a similar system for nurses
- 1904 a House of Commons Select committee was established to consider the registration of nurses, but no action was forthcoming.
- 1905 Nursing Times (journal) was launched
- 1907 First Aid Nursing Yeomanry (FANY) was created. Confusingly, their main roles were not as nurses but as ambulance drivers and as the organisers and administrators of hospital and casualty clearing stations for the Belgian and French armies
- 1908 Fever Nurses Association was created
- 1908 National Council of Nurses was formed
- 1909 Voluntary Aid Detachment Nurses (VADs) was formed.

=== 1914–1920 ===
==== First World War ====
By the beginning of the First World War in 1914, military nursing still had only a small role for women in Britain; 10,500 nurses enrolled in Queen Alexandra's Imperial Military Nursing Service (QAIMNS) and the Princess Mary's Royal Air Force Nursing Service. These services dated to 1902 and 1918, and enjoyed royal sponsorship. There also were 74,000 Voluntary Aid Detachment (VAD) nurses who had been enrolled by the Red Cross. The ranks that were created for the new nursing services were Matron-in-Chief, Principal Matron, Sister and Staff Nurses. Women joined steadily throughout the War. At the end of 1914, there were 2,223 regular and reserve members of the QAIMNS and when the war ended there were 10,404 trained nurses in the QAIMNS.

The First World War provided the final impetus to the establishment of nursing regulation, partly because of the specific contribution made by nurses to the war effort and also as a reflection of the increased contribution of women more generally in society. The College of Nursing (later the Royal College of Nursing) was established in 1916 and three years later persuaded a backbench Member of Parliament (MP), Major Richard Barnett, to introduce a private members bill to establish a regulatory system.

The bill was finally passed in December 1919 and separate Nurses Registration Acts were passed for England/Wales, Scotland and Ireland, which was still part of the United Kingdom at the time. These acts established the General Nursing Council for England and Wales and the other bodies which survived intact until the legislative changes in 1979 which were to create the United Kingdom Central Council for Nursing, Midwifery and Health Visiting and the National Boards of Nursing. Ethel Gordon Fenwick was the first nurse on the English register. The RBNA gradually lost membership following the Nurses Registration Act 1919; meanwhile the Royal College of Nursing (RCN) substantially increased its membership and influence.

- 1914-1918 First World War had a significant impact on the professionalisation of nursing (28 July 1914 – 11 November 1918),
- 1916 College of Nursing, later the Royal College of Nursing (RCN) was founded in London by Arthur Stanley (politician) Sarah Ann Swift Rachael Cox-Davies and Sidney Browne. A UK wide body, it established a Scottish Board in Edinburgh and an Irish Board established in Dublin.
- 1916 College of Nursing created a third voluntary register of nurses, which sat alongside the registers of the British Hospitals Association and the Royal British Nurses' Association. All three organisations lobbied for the Nurses Registration Act
- 1915 National Association of Masters and Matrons of Poor Law Institutions was created
- 1917 Cavell Nurses' Trust was created
- 1918 National Asylum Workers' Union organised strikes at Prestwich Hospital, Whittingham Hospital and Bodmin Hospital. It threatened to organise strikes in all the London asylums in support of a 48-hour week in 1919
- 1919 Association of Hospital Matrons was created
- 1919 Professional Union of Trained Nurses (PUTN) was created
- December 1919 the Nurses Registration Act 1919 was passed, the General Nursing Council (GNC) was created, and the Ministry of Health established.

=== 1920s ===
In the 1921 Census, 111,501 women and 11,000 men declared that they were nurses. The registration regimen stopped the very small hospitals from offering training. The first national examination was in 1925. About 40% of the candidates failed.

The Labour Party produced its first draft policy statement on the profession in 1926, advocating a 48-hour week, the separation of training schools from hospitals and advocating that the profession should be organised on Trade Union lines.

- 1921 Princess Mary's Royal Air Force Nursing Service (PMRAFNS) was created
- 1920-1922 the RCN campaigned against the Unemployment Insurance Act 1922. The National Insurance Act 1911 had exempted nurses from paying, as they were too low paid, but nurses were included in the 1920 Bill, despite wages remaining too low. The RCN successfully led nurses to lobby their MPs and the Minister of Labour, including a petition of 35,000 nurses. When passed in 1922 the Act exempted nurses
- 1922 the State Register of Nurses was first published by the General Nursing Council.
- 1926 British College of Nurses (BCN) was created.
- 1926 RCN closed its Irish Board in Dublin; retaining their Belfast centre
- 1928 Florence Nightingale Fellowship (FNF) was created
- 1928 the RCN was granted its Royal Charter
- 1928 the 'Federated Superannuation Scheme for Nurses and Hospital Officers' was incorporated in response to a campaign by the RCN that advocated for decent pensions for nurses

=== 1930s ===
In the 1931 Census, 138,670 women and 15,000 men declared that they were nurses. 88% of the women were single, 5% married and 7% widowed or divorced.

In 1930 nurses in the voluntary hospitals worked 117 hours a fortnight in London and 119 in the provinces. In 1936 the London County Council introduced a standard 54 hour week for nurses and in 1938 moved to a 96-hour fortnight.

In 1937 the Trades Union Congress adopted a "Nurses' Charter", demanding a 96-hour fortnight, improvement of the amenities of nurses' homes and arguing that nurses should be able to live out. At that time the average nurse was working 104 hours per fortnight.

- 1931 Lancet Commission on Nursing explored how to make nursing more attractive to young women in order to deal with shortage of trainees
- 1934 Florence Nightingale Foundation was formed.
- 1935 county councils began training courses for assistant nurses to care for the chronic sick.
- 1937 Society of Registered Male Nurses was created.
- 1937 National Nurses Association was created.
- 1938 Association of British Paediatric Nurses was created.
- 1939 George VI granted the title 'Royal' to the College of Nursing, enabling them to become the Royal College of Nursing
- 1939 Ministry of Health and Board of Education published the Athlone Report, an Interim Report of the Interdepartmental Committee on Nursing Services – which focused on nursing recruitment, retention and skills.
- 1939 Second World War starts.

=== 1940s ===
==== Second World War 1939–1945 ====
The armed forces estimated at the beginning of the war that they needed 5,000 trained nurses. Up to 67,000 were thought to be needed to care for the expected air-raid casualties. This was more than the number of trained nurses in employment. A Civil Nursing Reserve was set up - 7000 trained nurses, 3000 assistant nurses and also nursing auxiliaries. The auxiliaries were given fifty hours training in hospital before they started work. After protests it was agreed that they should not do domestic work. 6,200 from the Civil Nursing Reserve were working in hospitals in June 1940.

The Ministry of Health guaranteed a salary of £40 to nursing students in training, about double what voluntary hospitals were paying before the war.

During the war nurses belonged to Queen Alexandra's Imperial Military Nursing Service (QAIMNS), as they had during World War I. (Nurses belonging to the QAIMNS are informally called "QA"s.) Members of the Army Nursing Service served in every overseas British military campaign during World War II, as well as at military hospitals in Britain. At the beginning of World War II, nurses held officer status with equivalent rank, but were not commissioned officers. In 1941, emergency commissions and a rank structure were created, conforming with the structure used in the rest of the British Army. Nurses were given rank badges and were now able to be promoted to ranks from Lieutenant through to Brigadier. Nurses were exposed to all dangers during the War, and some were captured and became prisoners of war.Two hundred and thirty-six nurses died as a consequence of the war. Five nurses who trained at the Royal Victoria Hospital Belfast, N. Ireland died in service. Ruth Hannah Dickson had served in WW1. She re-joined the QA/Rs in Singapore having been a missionary in China. The evacuation ship she was aboard was hit by a Japanese U-boat as it left Singapore. She survived the attack to be taken Prisoner of War and died in a concentration camp in 1944. Ellen Lowry and Ida Nelson were nursing with the Colonial Service in Singapore. Their ship was also attacked leaving Singapore and they drowned. Doreen Pedlow QA was aboard a ship leaving Singapore when it too was hit. Doreen drifted for three days on a raft before she died. Beatrice Dowling was serving with the Naval Nursing Service in Singapore when she too died at sea. Their 5 names are on the Roll of Honour in Westminster Abbey. At the outbreak of WW2 there were 640 nurses attached to QAIMNS. By the end of the war this number had risen through the recruitment of reservists to 12,000.

==== Whitley Council or 'clinical grading' ====
The Whitley Council negotiated NHS terms and conditions of employment (pay). These placed nurses alongside other hospital staff on "grades" between A and I (with A being the most junior, and I the most senior). Unregistered staff were employed on grades A and B (occasionally grade C). Second level nurses were employed on various grades (usually between C and E), with first level nurses taking up grades D-I.

- 1941–1949 the RCN's Horder Committee (1941–1949) was created in response to the 1939 Athlone Report; it published four reports
- October 1941 Government established the Nurses Salaries Committee with Lord Rushcliffe as chair.
- November 1942 Government's Beveridge Report was influential in the founding of the welfare state in the United Kingdom
- 1943 Nurses Act 1943 was passed. It directed the General Nursing Council to regulate state enrolled nurses (until 1961 called 'assistant nurses') with two years' training instead of the three years' required for registered nurses. The act set out the formation, maintenance and publication of the roll and to establish conditions of admission to and removal from the roll. Unlike the Register of Nurses, the Roll included male and female assistant nurses on one list
- 1943 Nurses Salaries Committee or Rushcliffe Report published two reports. It was the first official body to fix salary scales and conditions for nursing in England
- 1944 Princess Elizabeth accepts position of President of the Student Nurses Association
- 1944 Education Act 1944 expanded secondary education and improved access to higher education
- 1946 RCN and the University of Edinburgh collaborated to create a nurse tutor course.
- 1946 Royal Commission on Equal Pay published its findings
- 1947 Ministry of Health, Department of Health for Scotland, and Ministry of Labour and National Service (Wood Committee) published its Report of the Working Party on the Recruitment and Training of Nurses.
- 1947 RCN joined the Equal Pay Campaign Committee
- 1948 National Health Service Act 1946 was passed
- 1948 the arrival of HMT Empire Windrush marked the post war migration of British Commonwealth subjects to the UK. Many Caribbean, African and Irish migrants went into nurse training helping to fill 54,000 nursing vacancies.
- By 1949 there were about 1300 registered male nurses; numbers of male nurses increased as demobilised service men with medical experience join the profession
- 1948 National Health Service Act 1946 (NHS) came into effect on 5 July 1948 with the NHS Act (Scotland) passed in 1949
- 1948 a Whitley Council (a partnership forum for discussion between employers and employees) was specifically established for nursing and midwifery in the NHS, at a time of significant nursing shortages
- 1948 Marie Curie Nurses was formed
- 1949 Nurses Act 1949, this reconstituted the General Nursing Council for England and Wales and amended the previous Nursing Acts, to improve nurse training. The reconstitution included abolishing the supplementary register so that male general nurses joined the general register alongside their female colleagues.
- 1949 The Queen Alexandra’s Imperial Military Nursing Service became a corps in the British Army and was renamed as the Queen Alexandra's Royal Army Nursing Corps.

=== 1950s ===
- 1950 Queen Alexandra's Imperial Military Nursing Service trained nurses
- 1951 following the 1949 Nurses Act, male general nurses joined the general nursing register
- 1951 The Lady with a Lamp film premiered, raising money for the RCN Educational Appeal Fund
- 1952 2nd Lt. Nurse Abbie Sweetwine of 494th Medical Group of the United States Air Force ran triage at the Harrow and Wealdstone rail crash based on her military field experience. The success of the team's response is credited with inspiring the development of the use of paramedics in Britain
- 1953 Nuffield Trust published HA Goddard's The work of nurses in hospital wards : report of a job-analysis. The first major study of nursing workload in the UK, it found that trained nurses spent too much time on non-nursing tasks, urging better delegation to ward orderlies and improved staffing
- 1956 University of Edinburgh was the first University in Europe to establish a dedicated Nursing Training Unit
- 1959 Mental Health Act 1959 abolished the legal separation of psychiatric hospitals, allowing those patients to be admitted to any hospital
- By 1959 most hospital nurses were working an 88-hour fortnight.
- 1959 General Nursing Council incorporated their supplementary registers into the general register.

=== 1960s ===
The availability of sterile supplies brought an end to washing and sterilisation of equipment such as dressings and syringes. Edinburgh initiated the first degree in nursing. Charlotte Bentley of the National Association of State Enrolled Assistant Nurses worked with Irene Ward, who was a member of parliament for Tynemouth. A private member's bill, the "Nurses (Amendment) Act, 1961", passed through parliament to remove the demeaning term "assistant" from the State Enrolled Nurse's job title.

- 1960 University of Edinburgh was the first UK higher education institution to offer a pre-registration bachelor's degree in nursing
- 1960 Able Smith asserted that more than a third of nurses in training failed to complete the training course, as has been the case for more than a century.
- 1961 it was considered that the use of the term 'assistant nurse' was hindering recruitment. The Enrolled Nurses Rules Approval Instrument SI 1961/1519 changed the name to State Enrolled Nurse and the Roll of Assistant Nurses became the Roll of Nurses
- 1962 RCN Welsh Board was established
- 1962 RCN launched a highly publicised salaries (pay) campaign
- 1963 Nursing Homes Act 1963 brought registration and greater control by local authorities
- 1963 RCN amalgamated with the National Council of Nurses of the United Kingdom to become the 'Royal College of Nursing and the National Council of Nurses of the UK'
- 1964 Daphne Steele became the first Black British matron
- 1964 RCN published its Platt Report 1964 on the Reform of Nursing Education
- 1964 RCN Northern Irish Committee became a Board
- 1964 Nurses Act 1964 gave the General Nursing Council the authority to regulate state enrolled nurses for mental health nurses and learning disability nurses by creating two additional rolls
- 1966 Salmon Report on Senior Nursing Staff Structure called for reform to nurse grading, initiating the end of matrons
- 1967 Nurse Dame Cicely Saunders set up the first hospice.
- 1967 Termination of pregnancy became legal under the Abortion Act 1967
- 1968 RCN membership was opened to students
- 1968-1971 RCN 'Raise the Roof' pay campaign saw them demand an average pay rise of 28%; they were awarded a 22% increase in salary staggered over two years
- 1969 University of Manchester offered an integrated degree programme in nursing, health visiting, district nursing and midwifery
- 1969 Government published the Mayston Report on Management Structure in Local Authority Nursing Services.

=== 1970s ===
The 1972 Briggs Report of the Committee on Nursing in the United Kingdom reviewed the role of nurses and midwives in hospitals and in community care. It made recommendations on education, training, and professional regulation. The report was accepted in 1974, but recommendations from the Briggs Report were not implemented until 1979 when it formed the basis of the Midwives and Health Visitors Act (1979).

Degrees in nursing became more widely offered through universities and polytechnics which combined higher level study and practical clinical ward based training. Newcastle Polytechnic, Leeds Polytechnic, Manchester University, London University and Liverpool University were the first. Each course was different. All led to SRN (State Registration), in addition to a degree (either B.Sc. or B.A). Some also included additional certifications such as Certificate in Obstetrics (Newcastle), Certificate in Health Visiting (Liverpool). Student nurses on these courses were unpaid, but may have been eligible for mandatory/ concessionary student grants. Unlike traditional hospital training courses which took three years, a Nursing Degree course lasted between 4 and 4.5 years.

- 1970 Government established the Joint Board of Clinical Nursing Studies to oversee nurse and midwifery post-certificate clinical training
- 1971 Permanent Committee of Nursing (PCN) of the European Economic Community was created
- 1971 Margaret Scott-Wright was made the first Professor of Nursing in the United Kingdom at University of Edinburgh
- 1972 Briggs Parliamentary Report on Nursing was published
- 1973 United Kingdom joined the European Economic Community, marking a shift in immigration policy that saw the end of the reliance on the Windrush generation who had significantly contributed UK nursing.
- 1973 Commonwealth Nurses and Midwives Federation (CNMF) was created with headquarters in London.
- 1974 RCN published their 'State of Nursing' report which led to negotiations with Barbara Castle on pay
- 1974 Halsbury Report was published by the government's independent Committee of Inquiry into the Pay and Related Conditions of Service of Nurses and Midwives; the Government implemented its recommendations for an average 33% pay rise for nurses
- 1974 Trade Union and Labour Relations Act 1974 (and the Industrial Relations Act 1971) prompted some health professional membership bodies, including the Royal College of Midwives, the British Medical Association and the Royal College of Nursing to register as trade unions.
- 1973 Jean McFarlane, Baroness McFarlane of Llandaff was appointed by Manchester University as the first professor of nursing in England (second in the UK)
- 1976 Royal College of Nursing (RCN) was registered as a trade union
- 1978-1979 RCN ran their 'Pay not Peanuts' pay campaign
- 1979 Report of the Committee of Enquiry into Mental Handicap Nursing and Care ('Jay Report') was published. The chair was Peggy Jay
- 1979 Royal Commission on the National Health Service chaired by Alec Merrison was published
- 1979 Nurses, Midwives and Health Visitors Act 1979 was passed, leading to the creation of the United Kingdom Central Council for Nursing, Midwifery and Health Visiting and the disestablishment of the General Nursing Council and the Central Midwives Board. This Act also protected the title registered nurse which could only be used by those on the NMC Register.

=== 1980s ===
In 1983, the United Kingdom Central Council for Nursing, Midwifery and Health Visiting (UKCC) was set up. Its core functions were to maintain a register of UK nurses, midwives and health visitors, provide guidance to registrants, and handle professional misconduct complaints. At the same time, National Boards were created for each of the UK countries. Their main functions were to monitor the quality of nursing and midwifery education courses, and to maintain the training records of students on these courses.

This structure survived with minor modifications until April 2002, when the UKCC ceased to exist and its functions were taken over by a new Nursing and Midwifery Council (NMC). The English National Board was also abolished and its quality assurance function was taken on board by the NMC. The other national boards were also abolished, but new bodies were created in each country to take over their functions, for example, NES in Scotland.

- 1979-1980 Government's independent Standing Commission on pay comparability report No. 3 on the pay of nurses and midwives, chaired by Hugh Clegg was published on 4 January 1980 (Cmnd. 7795). The report recommended various increases, ranging up to 25 per cent. for ward sisters and averaging 19·6 per cent
- 1981-1982 RCN ran its 'Bridge that Gap' pay campaign. Along with other unions there were mass meetings discussing pay, the state of the NHS, clinical grading and the abolition of the enrolled nurse. Although there was a nominal ceiling of 4%, selected unions, including the police, received higher awards. In June 1982 RCN members rejected the government’s offer, which raised its offer to 7.5%. This was rejected by members.
- 1982 in September the Trades Union Congress organised a Day of Action in support of health unions in their pay dispute. There was strike action by nurses who belonged to National Union of Public Employees or Confederation of Health Service Employees
- 1982 in the winter a further staggered increase for nurses averaging 12% was accepted by union members alongside a promise by the government to replace the Nurse and Midwives Whitley Council with an independent Pay Review Body.
- 1982-1984 Introduction of the Pay Review Body which replaced the Whitley Council which had previously set the salaries of nurses, midwives and health visitors.
- 1982 Primary Health Care magazine was launched, aimed at community health nurses.
- 1983 the United Kingdom Central Council for Nursing, Midwifery and Health Visiting (UKCC) became the profession's new regulatory body
- 1983-1984 RCN ran its ‘Nurse Alert’ Campaign opposing the government on a range of policies including the sale of nurses homes (which many nurses on low salaries depended on), financial and staffing cuts in the NHS.
- 1984 NHS Management Inquiry chaired by Roy Griffiths, led to the introduction of general management in the NHS
- 1984 Government introduced an independent pay review body for nursing staff, midwives, health visitors and professions allied to medicine
- 1985 RCN published its Judge Report on nursing education
- 1985 RCN ran its 'Please don't squeeze the nurses' pay campaign
- 1986 Government published the Cumberlege Report 1986 'Neighbourhood nursing: a focus for care', which recommended that community nurses be permitted to prescribe from a restricted list of treatments
- 1986 Project 2000: a new preparation for practice was published by UKCC
- 1987 RCN ran its 'No Nurses - No Future' pay campaign
- 1987 Nursing Standard was launched
- 1988 on 1 April the NHS introduced a Clinical Grading Structure for nurses and midwives which brought in the previous grades A to I
- 1989 Nursing Children and Young People (journal) was launched as Paediatric Nursing.

=== 1990s ===
- Reforms to training under Project 2000 began to be implemented
- Post-registration education was introduced
- Nurse-led helpline NHS Direct was founded
- 1992 men were allowed to join the Queen Alexandra’s Imperial Military Nursing Service
- 1992 the Medicinal Products: Prescription by Nurses etc. Act 1992 became law following an RCN campaign. This enabled registered nurses, midwives or healthvisitors with additional qualifications to prescribe medication
- 1993 Emergency Nurse journal was launched
- 1994 Nursing Management (journal) was launched
- 1995-1996 RCN ran its ‘Right to Nurse' campaign, in addition to lobbying for pay it lobbied for 'rights' including job security, management support and consultation, resources and time to care
- 1996 British Journal of Community Nursing was launched
- 1997 Journal of Child Health Care was launched
- 1998 RCN launched 'RCN Direct' a 24-hour phone line providing information and advice to members - one of the first unions to do so
- 1998 Evidence-Based Nursing (journal) was launched
- 1998: Mental Health Practice (journal) was launched.

== 21st century ==
=== 2000s ===
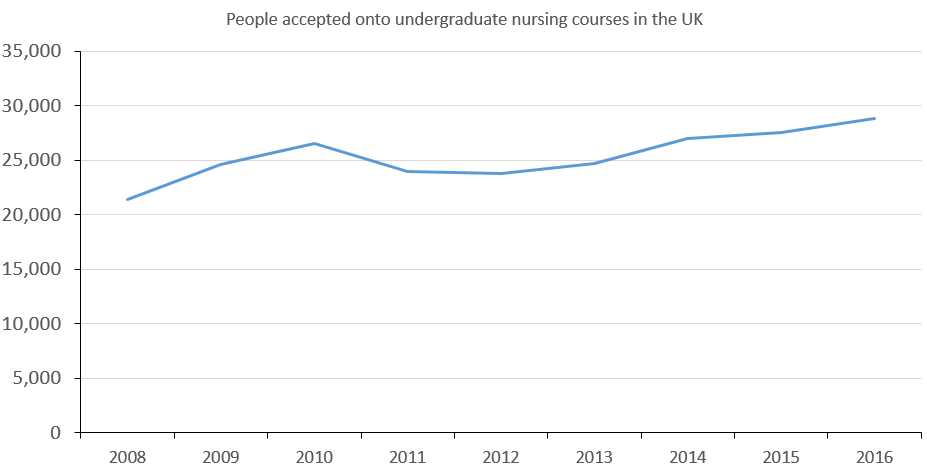
People accepted onto undergraduate nursing courses in the UK 2008-2016

Nurse education as a degree level qualification continued to shape the profession. From 2011, students studying a pre-registration nursing programmes in Scotland were required to complete a degree. From September 2013 all UK pre-registration nursing programmes were at undergraduate degree level.

- Health care reforms were set out in the NHS plan
- 2004 in December Agenda for Change was implemented across the UK, with pay and conditions backdated to 1 October 2004. This marked the end of the Nursing and Midwives Whitley Council.
- Nurse employers were inspected for staff-friendly policies under Improving Working Lives and Investors in People
- By 2001, nearly half of the newly registered nurses were immigrants, especially from the Philippines, India, South Africa, Australia and Nigeria, as compared to 10% in 1990
- 2001 RCN ran its Be Sharp, Be Safe staff safety campaign
- 2001 RCN admitted health care assistants into membership for the first time
- 2002 Nursing and Midwifery Council replaced the United Kingdom Central Council for Nursing, Midwifery and Health Visiting (UKCC)
- 2002 Cancer Nursing Practice journal was launched
- 2003 Gastrointestinal Nursing journal was launched
- 2005 nurse numbers reached 397,500 – an all-time high
- 2005 the NMC register, with its 15 sub-parts, was revised to just three parts: nurses, midwives and specialist community public health nurses.
- Nursing students were given supernumerary status throughout their three years of training
- 2006 383,000 qualified nurses and midwives were employed by the NHS, a 24% gain over 1997
- 2006 British Journal of Cardiac Nursing was launched
- 2008 NMC advised that the minimum academic level for all pre-registration nursing education would in future be a bachelor's degree. This was endorsed by the UK Government the following year
- 2009 RCN ran its Frontline First campaign which highlighted cuts to nursing posts.
- 2009 healthcare assistants (HCAs) were entitled to commission.

=== 2010s ===
- 2010-2014 There was a pay freeze for NHS staff.
- 2010 Front Line Care report was published, a prime minister's independent commission on the future of nursing and midwifery in England. A different Government was elected in May 2010 and responded to the report in April 2011. It was the first overarching governmental review of nursing and midwifery since the Briggs Report was published in 1972.
- 2010 RCN Foundation was incorporated as a charity, when the RCN separated its charitable and trade union activities
- 2010 RCN ran its Frontline First campaign ito highlight cuts to nursing posts.
- 2011 in Scotland, all pre-registration nursing programmes moved to degree level
- 2011 in March the London anti-cuts protest included nurses and midwives as did the day of action in November 2011. Throughout the year there were local demonstrations, actions, and protests about pay and pensions in the public sector.
- 2012 Quality with Compassion: the future of nursing education, an independent report commissioned by the Royal College of Nursing, led by Phil Willis was published
- 2012 RCN ran its This is nursing campaign to celebrate the positive work of the UK's nursing staff
- 2013 by September all UK pre-registration nursing programmes were at degree level
- 2014 Government rejected the NHS Pay Review Body (NHSPRB) recommendation for a 1% pay rise
- 2014 RCN ran its What if...? campaign to fight for members' pay and conditions
- 2014 midwives and nurses were amongst members from seven unions including the Royal College of Midwives and Unison who went on strike over pay
- 2015 in the Government's November spending review, George Osborne stated that he would remove the NHS Student Bursary from 2017
- 2015 in December nursing students held a political demonstration outside the Department of Health over the removal of the NHS student bursary, which was attended by several hundred supporters. Kat Webb initiated a petition on the government's e-petition site, which received more than 150,000 signatures
- 2015–2016, the minimum starting salary for a registered nurse was £21,692 in England, Wales while in Scotland it was £21,818. As of 4 June 2015, Northern Ireland was yet to announce their pay rates for 2015–16
- 2015 in November a pay cap was introduced by Jeremy Hunt as Health Secretary with further caps from February 2016 and April 2016. Trusts were not to pay agency staff more than 55% more for a shift than a permanent member of staff. The aim of the cap was to save £1bn over three years. Hunt said it would stop agencies "ripping off the NHS".
- 2016 Government announced that nurses would receive a 1% pay rise which would take effect from 1 April 2016. The RCN Chief Executive Janet Davies stated that "The fact remains that pay awards for NHS staff have been severely constrained since 2010".
- 2016 in January more than 7,000 NHS students and supporters marched on Downing Street in protest at the withdrawal of the student bursary. The protest was attended by Shadow Health Minister Heidi Alexander MP, Wes Streeting MP, Natalie Bennett, Sian Berry, representatives of UNISON, Unite the Union and Royal College of Midwives. The hashtag #bursaryorbust was the top trending Twitter.
- 2016 in February the nursing student bursary debate was raised in parliament at Prime Minister's Questions, and was the subject of the 'Early Day Motion (EDM) 1081 – The NHS Bursary' sponsored by Wes Streeting MP.
- 2016 in October Western Circle published research, claiming that the sector of NHS Nurses were heavily dependent on payday loans According to the research, the number of nurses using payday loans doubled in the 3 years since 2013.
- 2016 following the EU referendum, nurse applicants from European countries fell by 96%. In actual numbers in July 2016 1,304 nurses from the EU joined the Nursing and Midwifery Council register, whereas in April 2017 46 joined.
- 2017 the Government abolished the student nurse bursary in England and Wales, resulting in a 23% fall in the number of nurse degree applicants. Northern Ireland retained the bursary and applications remained steady at an average of 10 applicants per year for every one commissioned place on an undergraduate nursing programme
- 2019 the Prince of Wales Nursing Cadets scheme was launched.

=== 2020s ===
- By 2022 the lack of available nurses led to NHS Trusts routinely breaching the pay cap, paying up to £2,500 to fill shifts
- 2025 The Prince of Wales Nursing Cadets scheme was renamed the King's Nursing Cadets
- 2025 in February the Brent East MP Dawn Butler successfully introduced a bill in Parliament to protect the title of 'nurse'. This was in response to a campaign led by Alison Leary and Paul Trevatt. Government agreed it would be introduced via minor changes to the Nursing and Midwifery Order 2001.

== See also ==
=== Nursing organisations ===
The List of nursing organisations in the United Kingdom includes dates of creation which illustrate the historic development of nursing. The list includes a section on historic nursing organisations in the UK that no longer exist.
