= List of nursing journals =

This is a list of notable academic journals about nursing.

- AACN Advanced Critical Care
- AACN Nursing Scan in Critical Care
- Advances in Neonatal Care
- American Journal of Critical Care
- American Journal of Nursing
- AORN Journal
- Australasian Emergency Nursing Journal
- Australian Critical Care
- BMC Nursing
- British Journal of Cardiac Nursing
- British Journal of Community Nursing
- Canadian Journal of Nursing Research
- Cancer Nursing
- Cancer Nursing Practice
- Clinical Nurse Specialist
- Critical Care Nurse
- European Journal of Cancer Care
- European Journal of Cardiovascular Nursing
- European Journal of Oncology Nursing
- Evidence-Based Nursing (journal)
- Gastrointestinal Nursing
- Geriatric Nursing
- Heart & Lung
- Human Resources for Health
- International Emergency Nursing
- International Journal of Mental Health Nursing
- International Journal of Nursing Knowledge
- International Journal of Nursing Studies
- International Journal of Older People Nursing
- Issues in Mental Health Nursing
- Journal of Addictions Nursing
- Journal of Advanced Nursing
- Journal of Child Health Care
- Journal of Continuing Education in Nursing
- Journal of Emergency Nursing
- Journal of Holistic Nursing
- Journal of Nursing Education
- Journal of Nursing Management
- Journal of Nursing Scholarship
- Journal of Obstetric, Gynecologic, & Neonatal Nursing
- Journal of Orthopaedic Nursing
- Journal of Pediatric Nursing
- Journal of Pediatric Oncology Nursing
- Journal of PeriAnesthesia Nursing
- Journal of Perinatal & Neonatal Nursing
- Journal of Psychosocial Nursing and Mental Health Services
- Journal of Research in Nursing
- Journal of School Nursing
- Journal of the Association of Nurses in AIDS Care
- Journal of Tissue Viability
- Learning Disability Practice
- MCN
- Mental Health Practice
- NASN School Nurse
- Neonatal Network
- Nurse Researcher
- Nursing Children and Young People
- Nursing Ethics
- Nursing in Practice
- Nursing Management
- Nursing Older People
- Nursing Outlook
- Nursing Research
- Nursing Standard
- Nursing Times
- Orthopaedic Nursing
- Pediatric Nursing
- Policy, Politics, & Nursing Practice
- Primary Health Care
- Research in Nursing & Health
- The Journal for Nurse Practitioners
- The Nurse Practitioner: The American Journal of Primary Healthcare
- The Science of Diabetes Self-Management and Care
- Western Journal of Nursing Research
- Workplace Health & Safety

== See also ==
- List of medical journals
