= Patsy Yates =

Australian nursing academic and palliative care specialist

Professor Patsy Yates AM FAHMS

Personal details
- Occupation: Nurse

Patsy Yates is an Australian registered nurse, university professor, and institutional leader who works at the Queensland University of Technology (Brisbane), where she is a Distinguished Professor and Executive Dean of the Faculty of Health, Research Director of the Centre for Palliative Care Research and Education, and Co-Director of the Centre for Healthcare Transformation. She is a specialist in the field of palliative, cancer and aged care.

== Education ==
Yates completed her primary and secondary schooling at Loreto College Coorparoo, graduating in 1978. She became a registered nurse at Princess Alexandra Hospital (Brisbane, 1981), and qualified in midwifery at Mater Mothers Hospital (Brisbane, 1985). She also completed degrees as Bachelor of Arts (1986), Master of Social Science (1992) and PhD (2000) at the University of Queensland. In her PhD and derived work, she explored the experiences of recently bereaved caregivers of people with cancer.

== Career ==
After years working as a clinical nurse, Yates began a career as a nurse educator at the Holy Spirit Hospital(Brisbane). In 2003 and in 2010 she successively became Research Director, and Director of the Centre for Palliative Care Research and Education of Queensland Health, two appointments that she still holds. In 2005 she became Professor of the School of Nursing, Queensland University of Technology, where she successively became Deputy Head of School (2010-2013), Head of School (2014-2020), and Executive Dean of the Faculty of Health since 2020 to present.

She has been a tutor to many postgraduate students at QUT. Along her career she has been awarded substantial grants as a principal investigator to conduct research in the field of palliative care from institutions like the National Health and Medical Research Council ( Australia), the Australian Department of Health and the Oncology Nursing Society (US) and others.

As a journal editor, she has been editorial board member at Asia Pacific Journal of Oncology Nursing (2006 -), Cancer Nursing (2008 -), Progress in Palliative Care (2003 -), European Journal of Oncology Nursing (2009 -), Collegian (2014 -), Revista Latino-Americana de Enfermagem (2013-2016), and Journal of Nursing Research (2016 -); also Co-editor of the Australian Journal of Cancer Nursing (1999 - 2008).

Over many years to present times, Yates has been a member of several bodies at the National Health and Medical Research Council, among them the Research Committee, the Ideas Grants Peer Review Mentor Committee, the Innovation Assessment Working Group, and others. Also a member of the Primary Care Collaborative Cancer Clinical Trials Group Scientific Committee (PC4),

In the public policy field, Yates has been an advocate for increasing nurse-to-patient ratios, increasing public coverage of palliative cancer care, and supporting indigenous nursing scholarship.

As a leader, she is a past-President of Palliative Care Australia, and is President of the International Society of Nurses in Cancer Care.

In the 2020 Queen's Birthday Honours List, she was named a Member (AM) in the General Division of the Order of Australia. She was elected a Fellow of the Australian Academy of Heath and Medical Sciences in October 2022.

== Works ==
=== Papers ===
Yates has published over three hundred articles in academic journals. Her most cited articles are:

- Rosenberg, John P.; Yates, Patsy M. (2007). "Schematic representation of case study research designs". Journal of Advanced Nursing. 60 (4): 447–452. doi:10.1111/j.1365-2648.2007.04385.x. PMID 17822427. (cited 277 times,according to Google Scholar [
- Aranda, S.; Schofield, P.; Weih, L.; Yates, P.; Milne, D.; Faulkner, R.; Voudouris, N. (2005). "Mapping the quality of life and unmet needs of urban women with metastatic breast cancer" (PDF). European Journal of Cancer Care. 14 (3): 211–222. doi:10.1111/j.1365-2354.2005.00541.x. PMID 15952965. S2CID 25257025. (cited 253 times, according to Google Scholar [
- Yates, Patsy; Aranda, Sanchia; Hargraves, Maryanne; Mirolo, Bev; Clavarino, Alexandra; McLachlan, SueAnne; Skerman, Helen (1 September 2005). "Randomized controlled trial of an educational intervention for managing fatigue in women receiving adjuvant chemotherapy for early-stage breast cancer" (PDF). Journal of Clinical Oncology. 23 (25): 6027–6036. doi:10.1200/JCO.2005.01.271. PMID 16135471. (cited 188 times,according to Google Scholar [

=== Book chapters ===
Her most cited book chapters are:

- Kissane, David; Yates, Patsy (8 October 2018). "Psychological and Existential Distress". In O’Connor, Margaret; Aranda, Sanchia (eds.). Palliative Care Nursing (2nd ed.). Routledge. pp. 229–243. doi:10.4324/9781315378473-16. ISBN 978-1-315-37847-3. S2CID 67939901.
- Rosenberg, John; Yates, Patsy (2011). "Transition from conventional to health-promoting palliative care: an Australian case study". In Conway, S. (ed.). Governing Death and Loss: Empowerment, Involvement, and Participation. United Kingdom: Oxford University Press. pp. 99–107. ISBN 978-0-19-958617-2.
- Hardy, Janet; Glare, Paul; Yates, Patsy; Mannix, Kathryn (2015). "Palliation of nausea and vomiting". In Kaasa, S.; Cherny, N.; Fallon, M.; Currow, D. C. (eds.). Oxford Textbook of Palliative Medicine (5th ed.). United Kingdom: Oxford University Press. pp. 661–674. ISBN 978-0-19-965609-7.

== Awards ==
- 2007 Life membership as a Fellow of the Cancer Nurses Society of Australia
- 2009 Tom Reeve Oration Award from the Clinical Oncological Society of Australia
- 2010 Australian Learning and Teaching Council – Award for Outstanding Contribution to Student Learning
- 2014 - Sigma Theta Tau International Nurse Researcher Hall of Fame in 2017
- 2014 Awarded Premier's Award for Excellence in Leadership
- 2017 QuARRIES Award for Best Consumer Focused Project
- 2018 - Distinguished Researcher award from the Oncology Nursing Society (US).
- 2018 Outstanding Achievement in Nursing / Midwifery Award by the Association of Queensland Nursing and Midwifery
- 2020 Member (AM) in the General Division of the Order of Australia.
