= Journal of Infection Prevention =

- Discipline: infectious disease
- Language: English
- Edited by: Neil Wigglesworth

Publication details
- Former name: British Journal of Infection Control
- History: 2000–present
- Publisher: SAGE Publications on behalf of the Infection Prevention Society
- Frequency: Bimonthly

Standard abbreviations
- ISO 4: J. Infect. Prev.

Indexing
- ISSN: 1757-1774 (print); 1757-1782 (web)
- OCLC no.: 312713635

Links
- Journal homepage; Online access; Online archive

The Journal of Infection Prevention is a bimonthly peer-reviewed medical journal that covers the field of infectious diseases. The editor-in-chief is Neil Wigglesworth (Public Health Wales). It was established in 2000 and is published by SAGE Publications on behalf of the Infection Prevention Society.

== Abstracting and indexing ==
The Journal of Infection Prevention is abstracted and indexed in:

- Academic Search Premier
- Applied Social Sciences Index and Abstracts
- British Nursing Index
- CINAHL
- EMBASE/Excerpta Medica
- Nursing Abstracts
- Pubmed Central
- Scopus
