= Journal of PeriAnesthesia Nursing =

- Discipline: Perianesthesia nursing
- Language: English
- Edited by: Vallire D. Hooper and Jan Odom-Forren

Publication details
- Publisher: Elsevier
- Frequency: Quarterly
- Impact factor: 1.084 (2020)

Standard abbreviations
- ISO 4: J. Perianesth. Nurs.

Indexing
- ISSN: 1089-9472

Links
- Journal homepage

The Journal of PeriAnesthesia Nursing is a quarterly peer-reviewed healthcare journal of perianesthesia nursing.

It is the official journal of the American Society of PeriAnesthesia Nurses. It is indexed in CINAHL and Scopus.

== See also ==
- List of nursing journals
