= International Journal of Nursing Studies =

English monthly academic journal

- Discipline: Nursing
- Language: English
- Edited by: Peter Griffiths

Publication details
- History: 1963–present
- Publisher: Elsevier
- Frequency: Monthly
- Open access: Hybrid open access journal
- Impact factor: 7.1 (2024)

Standard abbreviations
- ISO 4: Int. J. Nurs. Stud.

Indexing
- ISSN: 0020-7489

Links
- Journal homepage; Science Direct

The International Journal of Nursing Studies (IJNS) is a monthly peer-reviewed nursing journal published by Elsevier. It publishes original research and scholarship about health-care delivery, organisation, management, workforce, policy and research methods relevant to in the fields of nursing, midwifery and related health professions.

== History ==
The journal was established in 1963 and was originally published on a quarterly basis by Pergamon Press. The founding editor-in-chief was Elsie Stevenson (University of Edinburgh). She was succeeded in 1968 by K. J. W. Wilson (University of Edinburgh, later University of Birmingham). Wilson stepped down in 1982 and was replaced by Rosemary Crow (Northwick Park Hospital) and Caroline Cox (University of London). Cox stepped down in 1992, and Crow (then at the University of Surrey), remained as sole editor-in-chief for a further eight years, a total of 18 years making her the longest-serving editor to date. From 2000 to 2004, Jenifer Wilson-Barnett (King's College London) was editor. She was succeeded in 2005 by the Ian Norman, also of King's College London. In 2026 Peter Griffiths of the University of Southampton assumed the role of Editor in Chief, having served alongside Ian Norman as Executive editor for many years.

The journal was inducted into the Nursing Journals Hall of Fame in 2019, recognising it as among the longest established journals in the field. In the same year an open access sibling journal, the International Journal of Nursing Studies Advances was launched.

== Abstracting and indexing ==
The journal is indexed in major databases including:

- Social Sciences Citation Index
- Science Citation Index Expanded
- EmCare
- Current Contents - Social & Behavioral Sciences
- Psychology Abstracts
- PubMed/MEDLINE
- CINAHL
- ASSIA
- Scopus
- British Nursing Index
- CISTI
- CIRRIE

According to the Journal Citation Reports, in 2024 the journal's impact factor was 7.1, with a 5-Year Impact Factor of 8.7, ranking first out of 1 journals in the category "Nursing".
