= Primary Health Care (magazine) =

- Frequency: 10 times a year
- Circulation: 7,150 (2014)
- Publisher: RCNi
- Founded: 1982
- Country: United Kingdom
- Based in: Harrow, Middlesex
- Website: journals.rcni.com/journal/phc
- ISSN: 0264-5033
- OCLC: 556252665

Primary Health Care is a professional magazine published 10 times a year by the RCNi, part of the Royal College of Nursing group. It publishes news, features, and clinical articles relevant to the practice of community health nursing in the United Kingdom. It is available in print or digital format.

The magazine was established in 1982. It is indexed by the British Nursing Index and CINAHL and available through most online aggregators as well as from the publisher.

In 2014 it had an average circulation of over 7,150.

== See also ==
- Portal:Nursing
- List of nursing journals
