= International Journal of Older People Nursing =

The International Journal of Older People Nursing is a quarterly peer-reviewed nursing journal published by Wiley. It covers advances in knowledge and practice in gerontological nursing.

== History ==
The journal was established in 2006 by Brendan McCormack (Queen Margaret University). The journal aims to challenge assumptions and promote critical analysis in order to advance nursing practice and inform debates about health and social care for older people worldwide. Its editor-in-chief is Sarah H. Kagan (University of Pennsylvania).

== Abstracting and indexing ==
The journal is abstracted and indexed in:

- CINAHL
- Current Contents/Social & Behavioral Sciences
- ProQuest databases
- MEDLINE/PubMed
- PsycINFO
- Science Citation Index Expanded
- Scopus
- Social Sciences Citation Index

According to the Journal Citation Reports, the journal has a 2020 impact factor of 2.115.
