= Laura Serrant =

British nurse and academic (born 1963)

- Born: 1963 (age 62–63); Nottingham, United Kingdom
- Education: Sheffield City Polytechnic
- Occupation: Professor in Nursing
- Employer: Manchester Metropolitan University

Laura Maria Serrant, CBE FRCN (born 1963) is a British nurse and academic. She is currently Regional Head of Nursing for North East and Yorkshire at Health Education England and Professor of at Manchester Metropolitan University, where she was previously Head of Department.

== Early life and career ==
Serrant was born in Nottingham, England, in 1963, the daughter of Dominican parents John Serrant and his wife, (née) Eudora Toussaint. She was not only the first in her family to attend university, but also one of the first nurses to qualify through a degree, graduating in 1986 with a Bachelor of Arts (BA) degree in nursing from Sheffield City Polytechnic.

Serrant's work specialises in sexual and reproductive health, including research into working with sex workers, alcohol and drug dependent individuals and tackling attitudes towards HIV and AIDS alongside policy development nationally and internationally with an emphasis on racial inequalities and cultural safety. She sat on the Prime Minister's independent commission into nursing and midwifery that published the Front Line Care (Report) in 2010. In 2016, Serrant appeared in BBC Four television documentary Black Nurses: The Women Who Saved the NHS, discussing the contribution and celebrating the influence of Black nurses in the National Heath Service (NHS).

In 2017, then Chief Nursing Officer Jane Cummings appointed Serrant as Chair of the BME Strategic Advisory Group for NHS England. Serrant has held a number of posts, having previously been Professor of Community and Public Health Nursing the University of Wolverhampton and Head of Evidence and Strategy in the Nursing Directorate of NHS England. She was also non-executive director of Sheffield Health & Social Care NHS Foundation Trust from April 2018 to August 2019. From May 2016 to November 2018, she also served as Professor of Nursing at Sheffield Hallam University.

In 2018, Serrant was appointed as the Head of the School of Nursing at Manchester Metropolitan University becoming the only black head of nursing in UK universities.

Outside of her work in nursing, Serrant has appeared on BBC Radio 4 programme Great Lives, where she nominated poet and activist Audre Lorde as deserving of the title of having lived a "Great Life". Furthermore, her relationship with poetry continued with the inclusion of a poem written by Serrant in a theatre production titled Windrush, which toured the UK in 2018. Serrant's poem "You Called ... and We Came" is featured on the National Windrush Monument.

Serrant became Chair of Sheffield Children's NHS Foundation Trust in January 2024.

== Honours ==
In 2014, the Health Service Journal compiled a list of the 50 people from Black and Minority ethnicities working within the NHS who are inspiring and making a difference and included Serrant for her work in community and public health nursing at the University of Wolverhampton.

In 2017, it was announced that Serrant was recognised in the 2018 Powerlist as the eighth most influential black person in the United Kingdom, and in the same year she was awarded an honorary doctorate by Abertay University.

In the 2018 Queen's Birthday Honours, Serrant was appointed an Officer of the Order of the British Empire (OBE) for services to health policy. She was awarded fellowship of the Royal College of Nursing in 2023. Serrant has also been included on the 2019, 2020 and 2021 Powerlist of the 100 most influential Britons of African/African Caribbean descent in recognition of her contribution to medicine.

In 2021, she received the Prestigious Nursing Times UK Chief Nursing Officers' Lifetime Achievement award for services to Nursing.

== Selected works ==
- Serrant-Green, L. (January 2001). "Inequality in provision of sexual health information". Professional Nurse. 16 (4): 1038–42. PMID 12029731.
- Serrant-Green, Laura (November 2001). "Transcultural nursing education: a view from within". Nurse Education Today. 21 (8): 670–678. doi:10.1054/nedt.2001.0663. PMID 11884181.
- Serrant-Green, Laura (July 2002). "Black on black: methodological issues for black researchers working in minority ethnic communities". Nurse Researcher. 9 (4): 30–44. doi:10.7748/nr2002.07.9.4.30.c6196. PMID 12149895.
- Higginbottom, Gina Marie; Serrant-Green, Laura (2005). "Developing Culturally Sensitive Skills in Health and Social Care with a Focus on Conducting Research with African Caribbean Communities in England". The Qualitative Report. 10 (4): 662–686. ISSN 1052-0147.
- Higginbottom, G. M. A.; Mathers, N.; Marsh, P.; Kirkham, M.; Owen, J. M.; Serrant-Green, L. (August 2006). "Young people of minority ethnic origin in England and early parenthood: views from young parents and service providers". Social Science & Medicine. 63 (4): 858–870. doi:10.1016/j.socscimed.2006.03.011. hdl:2436/29495. PMID 16678322.
- Serrant-Green, Laura (April 2007). "Ethnographic research". Nurse Researcher. 14 (3): 4–6. doi:10.7748/nr2007.04.14.3.4.c6027. PMID 17494463.
- Serrant-Green, Laura (16 November 2010). "The sound of 'silence': a framework for researching sensitive issues or marginalised perspectives in health". Journal of Research in Nursing. 16 (4): 347–360. doi:10.1177/1744987110387741. S2CID 145676922.
