= Research in Gerontological Nursing =

- Discipline: Nursing
- Language: English
- Edited by: Christine Kovach

Publication details
- History: 2008–present
- Publisher: Healio
- Frequency: Bimonthly
- Open access: Hybrid
- Impact factor: 0.855 (2017)

Standard abbreviations
- ISO 4: Res. Gerontol. Nurs.

Indexing
- ISSN: 1940-4921 (print); 1938-2464 (web)

Links
- Journal homepage; Online access; Online archive

Research in Gerontological Nursing is a monthly peer-reviewed nursing journal covering gerontological nursing. It was established in 2008 and is published by Healio.

== History ==
The journal was established as a quarterly journal in 2008 with Kathleen Buckwalter as founding editor-in-chief. She served until 2012, when she was succeeded by Christine R. Kovach.

In 2014, the journal increased its publication frequency from four issues per year to six.

== Abstracting and indexing ==
The journal is abstracted and indexed in:

- CINAHL
- Current Contents/Clinical Medicine
- Current Contents/Social & Behavioral Sciences
- EBSCO databases
- Embase
- MEDLINE/PubMed
- ProQuest databases
- Science Citation Index Expanded
- Scopus
- Social Sciences Citation Index

According to the Journal Citation Reports, the journal has a 2017 impact factor of 0.855.

== See also ==
- List of nursing journals
