= European Journal of Cardiovascular Nursing =

- Discipline: Cardiac nursing
- Language: English
- Edited by: Philip Moons

Publication details
- History: 2002–present
- Publisher: Oxford University Press
- Frequency: Bimonthly
- Impact factor: 5.4 (2025)

Standard abbreviations
- ISO 4: Eur. J. Cardiovasc. Nurs.

Indexing
- ISSN: 1474-5151 (print); 1873-1953 (web)

Links
- Journal homepage

The European Journal of Cardiovascular Nursing is a peer-reviewed nursing journal published by Oxford University Press. It covers cardiovascular nursing research. It is an official journal of the European Society of Cardiology and the Association of Cardiovascular Nursing and Allied Professions.

== History ==
The journal was established in 2002 by Tiny Jaarsma, Bengt Fridlund, David R Thompson, and Simon Stewart. From 2002 till 2021, the editor-in-chief was Tiny Jaarsma (Linköping University). The current editor-in-chief is Philip Moons (Katholieke Universiteit Leuven).

== Abstracting and indexing ==
The journal is abstracted and indexed in:

- Science Citation Index Expanded
- Social Sciences Citation Index
- EMBASE/Excerpta Medica
- ProQuest databases
- MEDLINE/PubMed
- Scopus

According to the Journal Citation Reports, the journal has a 2022 impact factor of 2.9.
