= Australian Critical Care =

Nursing journal

- Discipline: Critical care nursing
- Language: English

Publication details
- History: 1988–present
- Frequency: Bimonthly

Standard abbreviations
- ISO 4: Aust. Crit. Care

Australian Critical Care is a bimonthly peer-reviewed nursing journal covering clinically relevant research, reviews, and articles of interest to the critical care community. It is published by Elsevier and was established in 1988, with Pam Robinson as its founding editor-in-chief. It is the official journal of the Australian College of Critical Care Nurses and its current editor-in-chief is Andrea Marshall (Griffith University).

== Abstracting and indexing ==
The journal is abstracted and indexed in:

- CINAHL
- PubMed
- Scopus

According to the Journal Citation Reports, the journal has a 2017 impact factor of 1.930.
