= Research in Nursing & Health =

Nursing journal

- Discipline: Nursing
- Language: English

Publication details
- History: 1978-present
- ISO 4: Find out here

Research in Nursing & Health is a peer-reviewed nursing journal covering a wide range of research that will inform the practice of nursing and other health disciplines. It is published by Wiley.

== History ==
The journal was established in 1978, with Cathy Somer as its founding editor-in-chief. Its current editor-in-chief is Eileen Lake (University of Pennsylvania).

== Abstracting and indexing ==
The journal is abstracted and indexed in:

- CINAHL
- Current ContentsSocial & Behavioral Sciences
- EBSCO databases
- MEDLINE/PubMed
- PASCAL
- ProQuest databases
- PsycINFO
- Science Citation Index Expanded
- Scopus
- Social Sciences Citation Index

According to the Journal Citation Reports, the journal has a 2017 impact factor of 1.762.
