= Nursing Outlook =

Journal about nursing practice and research

Nursing Outlook is a bimonthly peer-reviewed nursing journal covering nursing practice, education, and research. It is published by Elsevier. The journal was established in 1994, with as its founding editor-in-chief Carole A. Anderson. It is the official journal of the American Academy of Nursing and its current editor-in-chief is Marion E. Broome (Duke University).

== Abstracting and indexing ==
The journal is abstracted and indexed in Scopus and CINAHL. According to the Journal Citation Reports, the journal has a 2017 impact factor of 2.425.
