= Emergency Nurse =

English monthyl magazine

- Categories: Nursing
- Frequency: Monthly
- Publisher: RCNi
- Country: United Kingdom
- Language: English
- Website: journals.rcni.com/journal/en

Emergency Nurse is an English monthly professional magazine which covers research and clinical articles relevant to the practice of emergency nursing. It is published by RCNi.

== See also ==
- List of nursing journals
