= Critical Care Nurse =

- Discipline: Critical care nursing
- Language: English
- Edited by: Annette Bourgault

Publication details
- History: 1981–present
- Publisher: American Association of Critical-Care Nurses
- Frequency: Bimonthly
- Impact factor: 1.707 (2017)

Standard abbreviations
- ISO 4: Crit. Care Nurse

Indexing
- CODEN: CCNUEV
- ISSN: 0279-5442 (print); 1940-8250 (web)
- OCLC no.: 802716971

Links
- Journal homepage; Online access; Online archive

Critical Care Nurse is a bimonthly peer-reviewed nursing journal covering research about bedside care of critically and acutely ill patients and critical and acute care nursing practice. It is published by the American Association of Critical-Care Nurses. The journal was established in 1981 with C. Gozensky and Penny Vaughn as its founding editors-in-chief. Its current editor-in-chief is Annette Bourgault (University of Central Florida).

== Abstracting and indexing ==
The journal is abstracted and indexed in:

- Academic Search Premier
- CINAHL
- Embase
- MEDLINE
- Science Citation Index Expanded
- Scopus
- Social Sciences Citation Index

According to the Journal Citation Reports, the journal has a 2017 impact factor of 1.707.
