= Heart & Lung =

Nursing journal

- Discipline: Cardiology
- Language: English
- Edited by: Nancy S. Redeker

Publication details
- History: 1995–present
- Publisher: Mosby on behalf of the American Association of Heart Failure Nurses
- Frequency: Bimonthly
- Open access: Hybrid
- Impact factor: 1.730 (2017)

Standard abbreviations
- ISO 4: Heart Lung

Indexing
- CODEN: HELUAI
- ISSN: 0147-9563
- LCCN: 72620968
- OCLC no.: 922678665

Links
- Journal homepage; Online access; Online archive; Journal page at publisher's website

Heart & Lung is a bimonthly peer-reviewed nursing journal covering research on the care of patients with cardiac and pulmonary disorders. It is published by Mosby on behalf of the American Association of Heart Failure Nurses. The journal was established in 1995, with Kathleen S. Stone as its founding editor-in-chief. Its current editor-in-chief is Nancy S. Redeker (Yale University).

The journal is abstracted and indexed in CINAHL, MEDLINE, and PubMed. According to the Journal Citation Reports, the journal has a 2017 impact factor of 1.730.
