= European Journal of Physical and Rehabilitation Medicine =

- Discipline: Physical medicine and rehabilitation
- Language: English
- Edited by: S. Negrini

Publication details
- Former name(s): Europa Medicophysica
- History: 1965–present
- Frequency: Bimonthly

Standard abbreviations
- ISO 4: Eur. J. Phys. Rehabil. Med.

Indexing
- European Journal of Physical and Rehabilitation Medicine
- ISSN: 1973-9087 (print); 1973-9095 (web)
- Europa Medicophysica
- ISSN: 0014-2573

Links
- Journal homepage

The European Journal of Physical and Rehabilitation Medicine is a quarterly peer-reviewed medical journal. It was established in 1965 as Europa Medicophysica and is published by Edizioni Minerva Medica (Turin, Italy). The editor in chief is S. Negrini. It is an official journal of the Italian Society of Physical and Rehabilitation Medicine, European Society of Physical and Rehabilitation Medicine, Mediterranean Forum of Physical and Rehabilitation Medicine, Hellenic Society of Physical and Rehabilitation Medicine, and the Turkish Society of Physical Medicine and Rehabilitation Specialists. The journal is abstracted and indexed by CINAHL, Current Contents/Clinical Medicine, Excerpta Medica, Index Medicus/MEDLINE, and the Science Citation Index Expanded.
