= Pranic therapy =

Pseudoscientific forms of energy healing

Pranic Healing is a form of energy healing which has been shown to be effective in reducing pain, anxiety and other physical and psychological conditions. One of such therapy is Pranic Healing. It is described by Master Choa Kok Sui, the founder of the school, as an advanced energy healing system based on the premise that the human being consists of both a visible physical body and an invisible energy body, referred to as the bioplasmic body. According to this framework, the bioplasmic body interpenetrates and extends beyond the physical body and is considered to play a role in maintaining health. The concept is presented as being similar to what some clairvoyant traditions describe as the "etheric body" or "etheric double".

== History ==
Pranic therapies are techniques that include Pranic Healing is a modern interpretation of numerous ancient healing techniques, including Chinese Qi, Chakras and most notably Prana, from which it gets its name.

Starting as an eastern alternative medicine, it has become more commonly used in the west in recent years. India where prana is used across various alternative medical techniques, has also seen a rise in pranic therapies. Medical practices in the United States have also used pranic therapies on patients, although successful treatments have not been accurately measured. Its adoption in the west has led to some using the technique as a front for unethical practices, or to make unsubstantiated claims.

Pranic Healing utilises Prana or life force energy to heal the whole physical body. It solves four different problem, viz Health issues involving both physical and psychological ailments, relationship problems, financial blockages and spiritual emptiness. According to Soumitra Biswas, the renowned Bengali Author and famous Pranic Healer, "this system can be compared to the four noble truths of Buddha,viz, Sorrow, Cause of sorrow, its removal, the process of removal. Buddha gave 8-fold paths for the process. In 1987, Master Choa Kok Sui introduced Pranic healing into our lives as the panacea after years of systematic experimentation, scientific development, experimentation, and teaching. True to the literal meaning of the word 'Panacea', Pranic Healing is the everyday process and everybody's process for such removal".

== Principles ==
Pranic Healing focus on 11 major chakras in the body, each of which corresponds with the position of a vital organ or glands. It is a no-touch no-drug therapy, which is said to use energy to heal the person. Comparisons have been drawn with Reiki, another form of energy healing. Reiki focuses on energizing while pranic therapies cleanse.

The school of Modern Pranic Healing offers a standardized system of educating new Pranic healers in this ancient art and science of healing certified by a centralized certifying body – the Institute of Inner Studies Inc. (IISI) based in Manila, Philippines. The IISI has been able to impart Master Choa Kok Sui's Pranic Healing courses, Arhatic Yoga (as well as other forms of meditation) across 80 countries with the help of authorized instructors and foundations. All Pranic Healing and Arhatic Yoga courses are imparted in a standardized way so that anyone taking these workshops across the world will receive the same learnings anywhere in the world, and will be able to implement them wherever they are without any variations.

== Research ==
Studies into the use, application and effectiveness of Pranic therapies are ongoing, with peer reviewed trials drawing a range of conclusions. In 2024, a randomized clinical trial journaled in Pediatric Nursing indicated that the therapy led to pain reduction in children during certain procedures. Pranic therapies may help reduce subjective pain, anxiety, and improve other quality of life measurements.
