= Journal of Continuing Education in Nursing =

- Discipline: Nursing, education
- Language: English
- Edited by: Patricia S. Yoder-Wise

Publication details
- History: 1970-present
- Publisher: SLACK Incorporated
- Frequency: Monthly
- Impact factor: 0.820 (2017)

Standard abbreviations
- ISO 4: J. Contin. Educ. Nurs.

Indexing
- CODEN: JCENB5
- ISSN: 0022-0124 (print); 1938-2472 (web)
- OCLC no.: 610202926

Links
- Journal homepage

The Journal of Continuing Education in Nursing is a peer-reviewed nursing journal published by Slack. It was established in 1970 and publishes original articles for continuing education in nursing.

== Abstracting and indexing ==
The journal is abstracted and indexed in:

- CINAHL
- Current Contents/Clinical Medicine
- Current Contents/Social & Behavioral Sciences
- EBSCO databases
- Embase
- MEDLINE/PubMed
- ProQuest databases
- Science Citation Index Expanded
- Scopus
- Social Sciences Citation Index

According to the Journal Citation Reports, the journal has a 2017 impact factor of 0.820.

== See also ==
- List of nursing journals
