= EBN =

EBN may refer to:

- East by north
- Eastbourne railway station, a railway station in Sussex, England
- Edible bird's nest
- Emergency Broadcast Network, an American multimedia performance group
- Energie Beheer Nederland, a Dutch natural gas company
- European Business News, now CNBC Europe, a television channel
- Evidence-Based Nursing
- Evidence-Based Nursing (journal)
- Stephan Ebn (born 1978), German musician
