= Ian Norman =

British nursing researcher and author

Ian James Norman
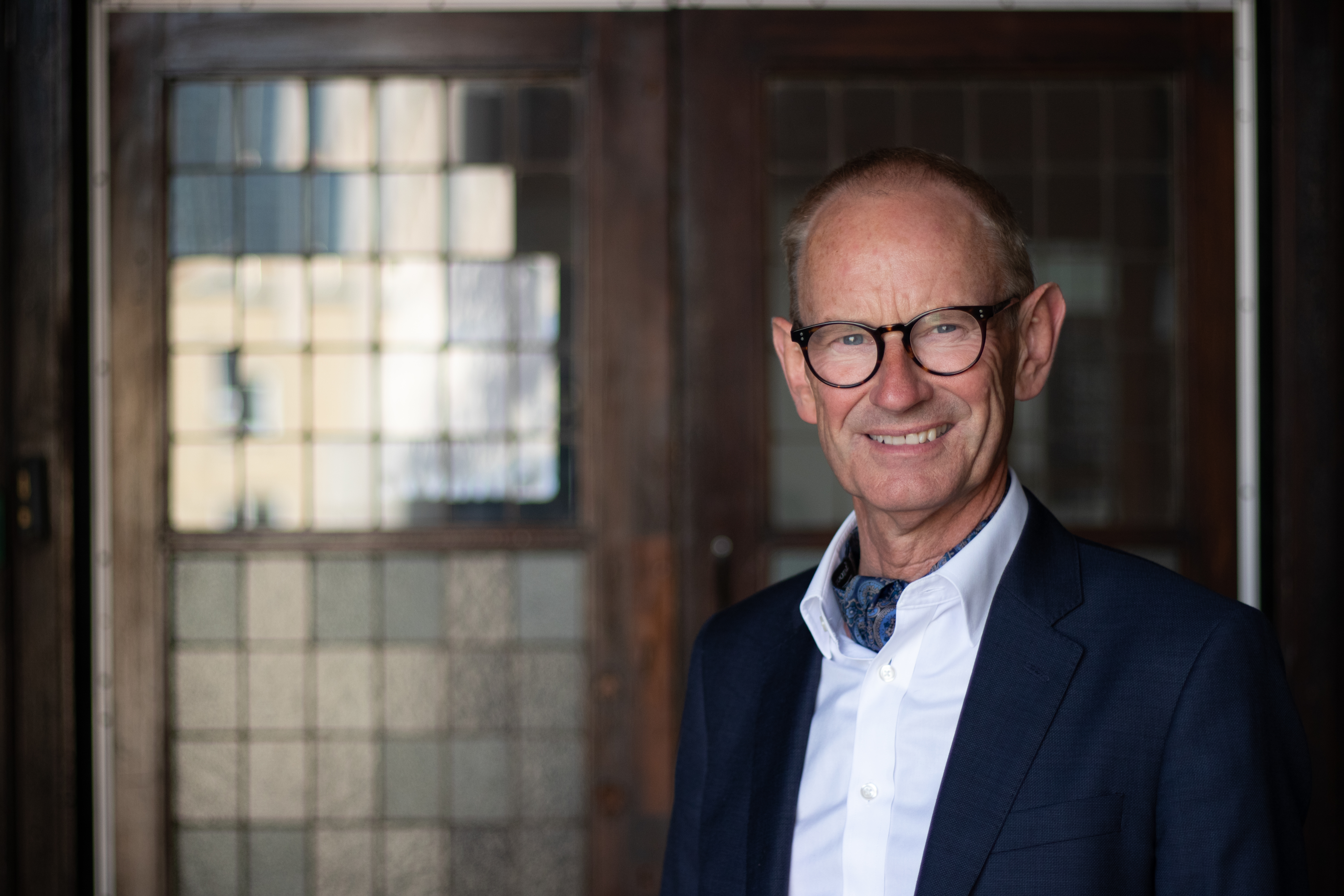
- Ian Norman
- Born: 21 December 1952 (age 73); Exeter, England
- Awards: Fellow of the Royal College of Nursing, International Fellow of the American Academy of Nursing, Fellow of King's College, London

Academic background
- Education: Exeter School, UK
- Alma mater: University of Edinburgh, University of Keele, University of London

Academic work
- Discipline: Nursing and Health Care
- Institutions: King's College, London

Ian James Norman is a British nursing researcher and author, based in Surrey, UK. His research and writing is focused primarily in the fields of psychiatric and mental health nursing, and psychological treatments for people with mental health difficulties. Norman is Emeritus Professor of Mental Health in the Faculty of Nursing, Midwifery & Palliative Care at King's College London. He is a former Executive Dean of Faculty and Assistant Principal (Academic Performance) at King's. He is the Editor-in-Chief of the International Journal of Nursing Studies and a practising cognitive behavioural psychotherapist.

== Biography ==
Ian Norman was born in Devon and attended Exeter School. He holds a BA degree in the social sciences from the University of Keele, an MSc degree in education from Edinburgh University and a PhD degree from London University. He was appointed as a Lecturer in Psychiatric Nursing in the Department of Nursing Studies, King’s College London, in 1988, was promoted to Senior Lecturer in 1994 and to Professor of Mental Health in 1997. He was appointed Editor-in-Chief of the International Journal of Nursing Studies in 2005.

Norman was a visiting professor at the University of São Paulo in 2011 and had periods of secondment to South Africa in 2014 and Ireland in 2015 to work on an EU-funded study to reduce the risk of codeine misuse and dependence.

In August 2018, Norman was interviewed on a live breakfast-time TV channel about a nursing education initiative between King's College London and Ngee Ann Academy Singapore and the world shortage of healthcare workers.

Norman is the author of more than 300 academic outputs. His latest book, The Art & Science of Mental Health Nursing (published in its 4th edition in 2018), is a standard textbook for mental health nurse education in the UK and is well known internationally.

== Awards and honours ==
- 2015: Fellow, King's College London
- 2015: Eileen Skellern Memorial Lecture http:
- 2012: International Fellow, American Academy of Nursing
- 2009: Fellow, Royal College of Nursing
- 2005: Fellow, UK Higher Education Academy
- 2004: Fellow, European Academy of Nursing Science

== Publications ==
Books

Norman IJ, Ryrie I (eds) 1st edition (2004); 2nd edition (2009); 3rd edition (2013), 4th edition (2018) The art and science of mental health nursing: a textbook of principles and practice. Open University Press, London.

Norman IJ, Cowley S (eds) (1999) The changing nature of nursing in a managerial age. Blackwells, London.

Norman IJ, Redfern SJ (eds) (1997) Mental health care for elderly people. Churchill Livingstone, Edinburgh.

Kogan M, Redfern SJ, Kober A, Norman IJ, Packwood T, Robinson S (1995) Making use of clinical audit: a guide to practice in the health professions. Open University Press, London.

== Memberships, licences, and associations ==
- Registered Nurse, Nursing & Midwifery Council, UK (1976–present)
- British Association of Behavioural and Cognitive Psychotherapists (2009–present)
- Member, Health Technology Panel for Mental Health, Psychology and Occupational Therapy National Institute for Health and Care Research, UK (2015-2018)
