= Journal of Research in Nursing =

- Discipline: Nursing
- Language: English
- Edited by: Andree Le May, Ann McMahon

Publication details
- History: 1995–present
- Publisher: SAGE Publications
- Frequency: Bimonthly

Standard abbreviations
- ISO 4: J. Res. Nurs.

Indexing
- ISSN: 1744-9871 (print); 1744-988X (web)
- OCLC no.: 58952097

Links
- Journal homepage; Online access; Online archive

The Journal of Research in Nursing is a bimonthly peer-reviewed nursing journal that covers the field of nursing. The editors-in-chief are Andree Le May (University of Southampton) and Ann McMahon. The journal was established in 1996 and is published by SAGE Publications.

== Abstracting and indexing ==
The journal is abstracted and indexed in Applied Social Sciences Index & Abstracts, British Nursing Index, and CINAHL.
