= Nursing Standard =

- Categories: Nursing
- Frequency: Weekly
- Publisher: RCNi
- Founded: 1987
- Country: United Kingdom
- Website: rcni.com/nursing-standard
- ISSN: 0029-6570
- OCLC: 487075954

Nursing Standard is a weekly professional magazine that contains peer-reviewed articles and research, news, and career information for the nursing field. The magazine was founded in 1987. It is published by RCNi. The magazine is abstracted and indexed in CINAHL and MEDLINE/PubMed.

== See also ==
- List of nursing journals
