= MCN =

MCN may refer to:

== Media ==
- MCN (journal), a peer-reviewed journal of obstetrical and neonatal nursing
- Multi-channel network, a type of organization working with video platforms to assist their owners
- Metro Chinese Network, a Rockville, Maryland Chinese-language TV station
- Music Center the Netherlands, promotes and archives Dutch professional music
- Motor Cycle News, a British motorcycling newspaper
- Motorcycle Consumer News, American motorcycling monthly

== Organizations ==
=== Government ===
- Muscogee (Creek) Nation, a federally recognized Native American tribe based in the U.S. state of Oklahoma

=== Military ===
- Military Counseling Network, a free source of information for U.S military concerning regulations and discharges
- Mountain Corps Norway, a German army unit during World War II
- Multinational Corps Northeast, military group in Szczecin, Poland

== Computing and technology ==
- Melbourne Centre for Nanofabrication, nanotechnology headquarters in Victoria, Australia
- Microcomputer Club Nederland, Dutch computer club in the 1980s–90s
- Museum Computer Network, concentrates on use of computer technology for museums
- Media Catalog Number, a type of Compact Disc subcode

== Transportation ==
- Machynlleth railway station, National Rail station code
- Middle Georgia Regional Airport, IATA airport code

== Medicine ==
- Pancreatic mucinous cystic neoplasm, type of cystic lesion that occurs in the pancreas
