= Complementary Therapies in Medicine =

- Discipline: Alternative medicine
- Language: English
- Edited by: Alyx Taylor

Publication details
- Former name: Complementary Medical Research
- History: 1986–present
- Publisher: Elsevier
- Frequency: 8/year
- Open access: Yes
- License: CC BY
- Impact factor: 3.6 (2022)

Standard abbreviations
- ISO 4: Complement. Ther. Med.

Indexing
- ISSN: 0965-2299 (print); 1873-6963 (web)
- LCCN: sn93038290
- OCLC no.: 45233428

Links
- Journal homepage; Online access; Online archive

Complementary Therapies in Medicine is a peer-reviewed medical journal covering complementary and alternative medicine, a field often designated as pseudoscience. It was established in 1986 as Complementary Medical Research, obtaining its current name in 1993. Although it was originally published three times per year by Routledge, it is now published eight times per year by Elsevier. The editor-in-chief is Alyx Taylor (Health Sciences University, UK).

== Abstracting and indexing ==
The journal is abstracted and indexed in:

- CAB Abstracts
- CINAHL
- Current Contents/Clinical Medicine
- Embase
- Index Medicus/MEDLINE/PubMed
- Science Citation Index Expanded
- Scopus

According to the Journal Citation Reports, the journal has a 2022 impact factor of 3.6, ranking it 10th out of 42 journals in the category "Integrative & Complementary Medicine".
