= Anatolian Journal of Cardiology =

- Discipline: Cardiology
- Language: English, Turkish
- Edited by: Çetin Erol

Publication details
- History: 2001-present
- Publisher: Kare (Turkey)
- Frequency: 12/year
- Open access: Yes
- Impact factor: 1.596 (2020)

Standard abbreviations
- ISO 4: Anatol. J. Cardiol.

Indexing
- CODEN: AKDNAO
- ISSN: 1302-8723 (print); 1308-0032 (web)
- OCLC no.: 664149523

Links
- Journal homepage; Online access; Online archive

The Anatolian Journal of Cardiology (Turkish: Anadolu Kardiyoloji Dergisi) is a peer-reviewed medical journal that covers all aspects of cardiology. It was established in 2001 and the editor-in-chief is Çetin Erol (Ankara University).

== Abstracting and indexing ==
The journal is abstracted and indexed in:

- Index Medicus/MEDLINE/PubMed
- Scopus
- EMBASE
- Science Citation Index Expanded
- CINAHL

According to the Journal Citation Reports, the journal has a 2020 impact factor of 1.596.
