= American Journal of Critical Care =

- Discipline: Critical care nursing
- Language: English
- Edited by: Cindy L. Munro

Publication details
- History: 1992–present
- Publisher: American Association of Critical-Care Nurses

Standard abbreviations
- ISO 4: Am. J. Crit. Care

Indexing
- ISSN: 1062-3264 (print); 1937-710X (web)

Links
- Journal homepage

The American Journal of Critical Care is a bimonthly peer-reviewed nursing journal covering evidence-based critical care nursing. It is published by the American Association of Critical-Care Nurses as its official interprofessional research journal. The journal was established in 1992, with C.W. Bryan-Brown and K. Dracup as its founding editors-in-chief. Its current editor-in-chief is Cindy L. Munro (University of Miami).

== Abstracting and indexing ==
The journal is abstracted and indexed in:

- MEDLINE/PubMed
- PsycINFO
- CINAHL
- Science Citation Index Expanded
- Current Contents/Clinical Medicine
- EBSCO databases
- Scopus

According to the Journal Citation Reports, the journal has a 2017 impact factor of 2.055.
