= Journal of Tissue Viability =

Quarterly medical journal

The Journal of Tissue Viability is a quarterly peer-reviewed medical journal covering all aspects of the occurrence and treatment of wounds, ulcers, and pressure sores. It is published by Elsevier.

== History ==
The journal was established in 1991 with P Shakespeare as its founding editor-in-chief. It is the official publication of the Tissue Viability Society and its current editor-in-chief is Dan Bader (University of Southampton).

== Abstracting and indexing ==
The journal is abstracted and indexed in:

- Index Medicus/MEDLINE/PubMed
- Scopus
- Science Citation Index Expanded
- Social Sciences Citation Index
- Current Contents/Clinical Medicine
- CINAHL

According to the Journal Citation Reports, the journal has a 2017 impact factor of 1.925.
