= International Emergency Nursing =

- Discipline: Emergency healthcare
- Language: English
- Edited by: Heather McClelland

Publication details
- Former name(s): Accident and Emergency Nursing
- History: 1993-present
- Publisher: Elsevier
- Frequency: Quarterly

Standard abbreviations
- ISO 4: Int. Emerg. Nurs.

Indexing
- ISSN: 1755-599X (print); 1878-013X (web)
- OCLC no.: 226437682

Links
- Journal homepage; Journal page at publisher's website; Online access

International Emergency Nursing is a peer-reviewed nursing journal covering emergency healthcare. It is published quarterly by Elsevier and is an official publication of the European Society of Emergency Nurses and the Faculty of Emergency Nursing. It was established in 1993 as Accident and Emergency Nursing and obtained its current title in 2008. The current editor-in-chief is Heather McClelland.
