= International Journal of Mental Health Nursing =

- Language: English
- Edited by: Kim Usher

Publication details
- History: 1980–present
- Publisher: Wiley
- Frequency: Bimonthly
- Open access: Hybrid
- Impact factor: 5.100 (2021)

Standard abbreviations
- ISO 4: Int. J. Ment. Health Nurs.

Indexing
- ISSN: 1445-8330 (print); 1447-0349 (web)
- OCLC no.: 49363331

Links
- Journal homepage; Online archive

The International Journal of Mental Health Nursing (IJMHN) is a bimonthly peer-reviewed medical journal covering psychiatric and mental health nursing. It is published by Wiley and is the official journal of the Australian College of Mental Health Nurses.

== Publication history ==
The journal started life in 1980 as the Journal of the Australian Congress of Mental Health Nurses, and was rebadged as the Australian Journal of Mental Health Nursing in 1990. The journal was relaunched in July 1992 as a fully refereed (peer-reviewed) journal. In 1994 it was renamed Australian and New Zealand Journal of Mental Health Nursing before obtaining its current name in 2002. Articles have been published online since May 2002. From 2008, issues going back to 1999 were retrospectively made available online. The last printed version of the journal was volume 24, issue 6 (December 2015).

The list of chief editors, arranged by year commenced, is as below:

- 1980 Dennis Cowell
- 1982 Ron Dee
- 1986 Owen Sollis
- 1987 Linda Salomons
- 1988 Andrew King
- 1990 Michael Clinton
- 1999 Michael Hazelton
- 2004 Brenda Happell
- 2015 Kim Usher (University of New England).

The journal has had a social media presence since June 2012, and has had an active Social Media Editor since 2017.

== Abstracting and indexing ==
The journal is abstracted and indexed in:

- CINAHL
- Current Contents/Social & Behavioral Sciences
- MEDLINE/PubMed
- PsycINFO
- Science Citation Index Expanded
- Scopus
- Social Sciences Citation Index

According to the Journal Citation Reports, the journal has a 2021 impact factor of 5.100, ranking it 2nd out of 125 journals in the category "Nursing".
