= BMC Nursing =

- Discipline: Nursing
- Language: English

Publication details
- History: 2002–present
- Publisher: BioMed Central
- Frequency: Upon acceptance
- Open access: Yes

Standard abbreviations
- ISO 4: BMC Nurs.

Indexing
- ISSN: 1472-6955
- OCLC no.: 49616515

Links
- Journal homepage; Online archive

BMC Nursing is an open access peer-reviewed nursing journal published by BioMed Central covering all aspects of nursing research, training, education, and practice.

Publishers of Nursing journals have traditionally been slow to move to online and open access publishing, meaning BMC Nursing's launch in 2002 has made it one of the most widely known open access journals in the field.

== See also ==
- List of nursing journals
