= Journal of Nursing Management =

Nursing journal

- Discipline: Nursing management
- Language: English
- Edited by: Dr. Justin Fontenot

Publication details
- History: 1993–present
- Publisher: John Wiley & Sons
- Open access: Yes
- Impact factor: 4 (2022)

Standard abbreviations
- ISO 4: J. Nurs. Manag.

Indexing
- CODEN: JNMNEN
- ISSN: 0966-0429 (print); 1365-2834 (web)
- OCLC no.: 865201764

Links
- Journal homepage

The Journal of Nursing Management is a peer-reviewed journal covering advances in the discipline of nursing management and leadership. It was established in 1993 by Anthony Palmer, and is published by John Wiley & Sons. The journal is currently edited by Justin Fontenot, Ph.D., RN, NEA-BC, FAADN.

== Abstracting and indexing ==
The journal is abstracted and indexed in the following bibliographic databases:

- Academic Search
- Academic Search Alumni Edition
- Academic Search Elite
- Academic Search Premier
- British Nursing Database
- CINAHL: Cumulative Index to Nursing & Allied Health Literature
- Current Contents: Clinical Medicine
- Current Contents: Social & Behavioral Sciences
- Health & Medical Collection
- Health Research Premium Collection
- Health Source Nursing/Academic
- HEED: Health Economic Evaluations Database
- Hospital Premium Collection
- MEDLINE/PubMed
- ProQuest Central
- ProQuest Central K-347
- PsycINFO/Psychological Abstracts
- Research Library
- Research Library Prep
- Science Citation Index Expanded
- SCOPUS
- Social Sciences Citation Index
- Web of Science

According to the Journal Citation Reports, the journal has a 2020 impact factor of 3.325, ranking 143rd out of 226 in the category 'Management', 7th out of 124 in the category 'Nursing' and 7th out of 122 in the category 'Nursing (Social Science)'.
