= Edith MacGregor Rome =

British nurse and administrator

Edith Sheriff MacGregor Rome, RRC (1870 – 6 June 1938) was a British nursing matron and administrator. She served as president of the Royal College of Nursing from 1933 to 1934, and again from 1937 to 1938.

== Early life ==
Edith Sheriff MacGregor was born in Glasgow in 1870. She was the daughter of George Sheriff-MacGregor of Glengyle. She was educated in Glasgow and Germany.

== Career and marriage ==
Rome was trained at Westminster Hospital from 1894 to 1898, and joined the College of Nursing in its foundation year 1916 as member 998. She registered with the General Nursing Council in 1921 as one of its first members, number 164.

Rome later served as assistant matron of the Warneford Hospital, Leamington and as matron of the Paddington Green Children's Hospital. During the First World War, she led a nursing unit of the British Red Cross Society into Romania in 1916, and then onwards in 1918 to Russia and Serbia with Lady Muriel Paget's unit. Rome was a member of staff for the College of Nursing from 1920 to 1930 as the first secretary of the Student Nurses' Association, until leaving to get married in 1930.

She married Colonel GPM Rome of Knockbay, Campbeltown, Argyllshire, becoming known as Edith MacGregor Rome. She succeeded Sarah Swift as matron-in-chief of the British Red Cross Society before going on to serve two terms as president of the Royal College of Nursing, from 1933–1934 and from 1937 to 1938.

== Honours ==
For her service in the First World War, Rome was awarded the following honours:

- Royal Red Cross, 1st Class (UK)
- Order of Regina Maria, 1st Class (Rumania)
- Order of Saint Anna (Russia)

== Death ==
Rome died on 6 June 1938. Her funeral was held at the Southampton Crematorium on 13 June and a memorial service was held in the chapel.
