= Journal of Pediatric Oncology Nursing =

Journal of Pediatric Hematology/Oncology Nursing
- Discipline: Pediatric nursing, oncology nursing, hematology nursing
- Language: English
- Edited by: Kristin Stegenga

Publication details
- Former name: Journal of Pediatric Oncology Nursing
- History: 1984-present
- Publisher: SAGE Publications
- Frequency: Bimonthly
- Impact factor: 1.636 (2020)

Standard abbreviations
- ISO 4: J. Pediatr. Oncol. Nurs.

Indexing
- ISSN: 2752-7530 (print); 2752-7549 (web)
- OCLC no.: 19471182

Links
- Journal homepage

The Journal of Pediatric Hematology/Oncology Nursing is a peer-reviewed nursing journal covering pediatric and oncology nursing. The editor-in-chief is Kristin Stegenga (Children's Mercy Hospital). It was established in 1985 and is published by SAGE Publications in association with the Association of Pediatric Hematology/Oncology Nurses (APHON). The journal changed its name from Journal of Pediatric Oncology Nursing (JOPON) to Journal of Pediatric Hematology/Oncology Nursing (JOPHON) on January 1, 2022.

== Abstracting and indexing ==
The journal is abstracted and indexed in MEDLINE, PsycINFO, Scopus, and the Science Citation Index Expanded. According to the Journal Citation Reports, its 2020 impact factor is 1.636.
