= Journal of School Nursing =

- Language: English
- Edited by: Julia Muennich Cowell

Publication details
- History: 2000-present
- Publisher: SAGE Publications
- Frequency: Bimonthly
- Impact factor: 1.768 (2018)

Standard abbreviations
- ISO 4: J. Sch. Nurs.

Indexing
- ISSN: 1059-8405
- OCLC no.: 300305816

Links
- Journal homepage; Online access; Online archive

The Journal of School Nursing is a bimonthly peer-reviewed nursing journal covering the field of school nursing. The journal's editor-in-chief is Martha Dewey Bergren (University of Illinois-Chicago). The journal was established in 1984 and is published by SAGE Publications in association with the National Association of School Nursing.

== Abstracting and indexing ==
The journal is abstracted and indexed in Scopus and the Social Sciences Citation Index. According to the Journal Citation Reports, the journal has a 2021 impact factor of 2.835.
