= Charlotte Bentley =

British nurse and nursing activist (1915–1996)

- Born: 5 December 1915; Great Portland Street, London, England
- Died: 20 March 1996 (aged 80); London Borough of Camden, London, England
- Education: Royal Free Hospital
- Employer(s): nurse and activist
- Known for: improving the status of nurses

Charlotte Eliza Bentley MBE (5 December 1915 – 20 March 1996) was a British nurse and nursing activist. She raised the status of nurses as part of the British nursing history. She had them established as students during training and established State Enrolled Nurses as not just "assistant nurses".

== Life ==
Bentley was born in 63 Portland Court on Great Portland Street, London in 1915. Her parents were John and Charlotte and her father worked as a hosier. She began to work at the Royal Free Hospital in London. She was training to be a nurse, but the training was frequently work. She rose to lead the British Student Nurses' Association and she successfully campaigned to have trainee nurses to be called students until they passed their state registration exams and became SRNs State Registered Nurses. She moved from the teaching hospital to join Lambeth General Hospital as a sister in charge in 1948. By this time the 1943 Nurses' Act had been passed and a new type of nurse a "State Enrolled Nurse (SEN)" was now recognised. These nurses were seen as second class nurses whereas Bentley saw them as more practical versions and not so theoretical as a State Registered Nurse.

Bentley was elected to lead the "National Association of State Enrolled Assistant Nurses" as General Secretary despite being a SRN rather than a SEN nurse. Her first years wage had to be met bu an appeal to members as she resolved conflicts between hospital managers and the undervalued SEN nurses. Her organisation organised holidays for nurses irrespective of their qualification. Bentley worked with Irene Ward who was a member of parliament for Tynemouth and a private member's bill, the "Nurses (Amendment) Act, 1961", passed through parliament to remove the demeaning "assistant" from the SEN's job title.

In 1973 the Royal College of Nursing set up a joint committee with the Royal College of General Practitioners to try and improve understanding in their professions. The committee consisted of a secretary, four doctors (all men) and five women who were all nurses.

Bentley died in 1996 after suffering with Parkinson's in the London Borough of Camden.
