= Journal of Nursing Education =

- Discipline: Nursing
- Language: English
- Edited by: Amy J. Barton

Publication details
- History: 1962–present
- Publisher: SLACK Incorporated
- Frequency: Monthly
- Impact factor: 1.726 (2020)

Standard abbreviations
- ISO 4: J. Nurs. Educ.

Indexing
- CODEN: JNUEAW
- ISSN: 0148-4834 (print); 1938-2421 (web)
- LCCN: sf80000462
- OCLC no.: 01644709

Links
- Journal homepage; SLACK Incorporated nursing journals

The Journal of Nursing Education is a monthly peer-reviewed nursing journal. It was established in 1962 and is abstracted and indexed in MEDLINE.

== History ==
The Journal of Nursing Education began as a quarterly journal published by McGraw-Hill. The first editor-in-chief was Alice Bicknell, although she was supplanted by a small editorial board in the journal's second year. This editorial board continued their oversight until 1981, at which time SLACK Incorporated became the journal's publisher and assigned Margaret Carnine as its editor. As of September 2018, the editor-in-chief is Amy J. Barton, PhD, and the associate editor is Teri A. Murray, PhD.

In 2002, the journal increased from nine issues per year to 12.

== Editors-in-chief ==
The following persons have been or are editor-in-chief of the Journal of Nursing Education:

1. Alice Bicknell (1962)
2. Editorial board (1963–1980)
3. Margaret Carnine (1981–1982)
4. Rheba de Tornyay (1983–1990)
5. Christine A. Tanner (1991–2012)
6. Janis P. Bellack (2012–2018)
7. Amy J. Barton (2018–present)

== See also ==
- List of nursing journals
