= The Nurse Practitioner: The American Journal of Primary Healthcare =

The Nurse Practitioner
- Discipline: Nursing
- Language: English
- Edited by: Jamesetta A. Newland

Publication details
- History: 1975-present
- Publisher: Lippincott Williams & Wilkins
- Frequency: Monthly

Standard abbreviations
- ISO 4: Nurse Pract.

Indexing
- CODEN: NRPRDJ
- ISSN: 0361-1817 (print); 1538-8662 (web)
- OCLC no.: 55070923

Links
- Journal homepage; Online archive

The Nurse Practitioner: The American Journal of Primary Healthcare is a peer-reviewed nursing journal covering the practice of nurse practitioners. It is abstracted and indexed in Index Medicus/Medline/PubMed.
