= Western Journal of Nursing Research =

- Discipline: Nursing
- Language: English
- Edited by: Vicki Conn

Publication details
- History: 1979-present
- Publisher: SAGE Publications
- Frequency: 10/year
- Impact factor: 1.217 (2012)

Standard abbreviations
- ISO 4: West. J. Nurs. Res.

Indexing
- ISSN: 0193-9459 (print); 1552-8456 (web)
- OCLC no.: 475164874

Links
- Journal homepage; Online access; Online archive

The Western Journal of Nursing Research is a peer-reviewed nursing journal that covers clinical research in the field of nursing. It was established as a quarterly in 1979 by founding editor-in-chief Pamela Brink, working with the Western Council on Higher Education in Nursing and KNI Publishing, which was acquired by SAGE Publications in 1984. In 2003, it became the official journal of Midwest Nursing Research Society. Brink was succeeded by Vicki Conn in 2007.

== Abstracting and indexing ==
The Western Journal of Nursing Research is abstracted and indexed in Scopus and the Social Sciences Citation Index. According to the Journal Citation Reports, its 2012 impact factor is 1.217.
