= Geriatric Nursing (journal) =

- Discipline: Geriatric nursing
- Language: English
- Edited by: Barbara Resnick

Publication details
- History: 1980–present
- Publisher: Elsevier
- Frequency: Monthly
- Impact factor: 0.881 (2012)

Standard abbreviations
- ISO 4: Geriatr. Nurs.

Indexing
- ISSN: 0197-4572 (print); 1528-3984 (web)
- LCCN: 80644832
- OCLC no.: 779663316

Links
- Journal homepage; Online access; Online archive

Geriatric Nursing is a peer-reviewed healthcare journal covering the specialty of geriatric nursing published by Elsevier. It is the official journal of the American Assisted Living Nurses Association (AALNA) and Nurses Improving Care for Healthsystems Elders (NICHE). The journal is abstracted and indexed in MEDLINE/PubMed and CINAHL. The journal was established in 1980 and the editor-in-chief is Barbara Resnick.
