= Journal of Nursing Scholarship =

Peer-reviewed nursing journal

The Journal of Nursing Scholarship is a bimonthly peer-reviewed nursing journal published by Wiley. It covers nursing research and is the official journal of Sigma Theta Tau International. The editor-in-chief is Susan Gennaro (Connell School of Nursing). The journal was originally titled Image when first published starting in 1967, then continued as Image: The Journal of Nursing Scholarship from 1984 until 1999.

== Abstracting and indexing ==
The journal is abstracted and indexed in:

- Academic ASAP
- EBSCO databases
- ProQuest databases
- Current Contents/Social & Behavioral Sciences
- InfoTrac
- MEDLINE/PubMed
- PsycINFO
- Science Citation Index Expanded
- Scopus
- Social Sciences Citation Index

According to the Journal Citation Reports, the journal has a 2020 impact factor of 3.176.
