= Learning Disability Practice =

- Discipline: Psychiatric, mental health, and addiction nursing
- Language: English

Publication details
- History: 1998–present
- Publisher: Royal College of Nursing
- Frequency: Monthly

Standard abbreviations
- ISO 4: Learn. Disabil. Pract.

Indexing
- ISSN: 1465-8712 (print); 2047-8968 (web)
- OCLC no.: 48502948

Links
- Journal homepage

Learning Disability Practice is a monthly nursing journal which publishes original research and clinical articles relevant to the practice of learning disability nursing. It is published by RCNi.
