= Nursing Children and Young People =

- Discipline: Paediatric nursing
- Language: English
- Edited by: Christine Walker

Publication details
- Former name: Paediatric Nursing
- History: 1989–present
- Publisher: RCN Publishing (United Kingdom)
- Frequency: 10/year

Standard abbreviations
- ISO 4: Nurs. Child. Young People

Indexing
- ISSN: 0962-9513
- OCLC no.: 54453993

Links
- Journal homepage; Online access; Online archive

Nursing Children and Young People is a nursing journal covering the practice of pediatric nursing. The journal was established in 1989 as Paediatric Nursing, obtaining its current title in 2014, and is published by RCN Publishing. It is abstracted and indexed in CINAHL, Embase, MEDLINE/PubMed, Scopus, ProQuest, EBSCO databases, and Thomson Gale.

== See also ==
- List of nursing journals
