= Journal of Addictions Nursing =

- Discipline: Nursing
- Language: English
- Edited by: Christine Vourakis

Publication details
- History: 1989-present
- Publisher: Lippincott Williams & Wilkins (United Kingdom)
- Frequency: Quarterly
- Impact factor: 0.400 (2016)

Standard abbreviations
- ISO 4: J. Addict. Nurs.

Indexing
- ISSN: 1088-4602 (print); 1548-7148 (web)
- OCLC no.: 34618968

Links
- Journal homepage

The Journal of Addictions Nursing is a peer-reviewed nursing journal which publishes original articles on current research, issues, practices and innovations in the field of addictions, with a focus on addictions nursing. It is the official journal of the International Nurses Society on Addictions.

The journal is edited by Christine Vourakis (California State University, Sacramento, California, US). It has been published since 1989 and according to Journal Citation Reports it has a 2016 impact factor of 0.400. The journal is published quarterly.
