= Journal of Pediatric Nursing =

- Discipline: Pediatric nursing
- Language: English
- Edited by: Mandie Jane Foster

Publication details
- History: 1986–present
- Publisher: Elsevier
- Impact factor: 1.800 (2017)

Standard abbreviations
- ISO 4: J. Pediatr. Nurs.

Indexing
- ISSN: 0882-5963

Links
- Journal homepage

The Journal of Pediatric Nursing (also known as JPN) is a peer-reviewed nursing journal publishing evidence-based practice, quality improvement, theory, and research papers on a variety of pediatric nursing topics, covering the life span from birth to adolescence. It is published by Elsevier.

== History ==
The journal was established in 1986, with Dr Cecily L. Betz as its founding editor-in-chief. It is the official journal of the Society of Pediatric Nurses and the Pediatric Endocrinology Nursing Society and its current editor-in-chief is Dr Cecily L. Betz (University of Southern California).

== Abstracting and indexing ==
The journal is abstracted and indexed in:

- CINAHL
- MEDLINE
- PubMed

According to the Journal Citation Reports, the journal has a 2017 impact factor of 1.800.
