= Australasian Emergency Nursing Journal =

The Australasian Emergency Nursing Journal is a quarterly peer-reviewed nursing journal covering issues in emergency nursing. It is the official journal of the College of Emergency Nursing Australasia and is published on their behalf by Elsevier.
