= Canadian Journal of Nursing Research =

- Discipline: Nursing
- Language: English

Publication details
- History: 1968-present
- Publisher: SAGE Publishing (formerly McGill University School of Nursing) (Canada)

Standard abbreviations
- ISO 4: Can. J. Nurs. Res.

Indexing
- ISSN: 0844-5621

Links
- Journal homepage

The Canadian Journal of Nursing Research is a nursing journal published by SAGE Publishing. Its primary goal is to publish original nursing research that develops a basic knowledge for the discipline and examines the application of the knowledge in practice.

== See also ==
- List of nursing journals
