= Clinical Nurse Specialist (journal) =

- Discipline: Nursing
- Language: English
- Edited by: Janet S. Fulton

Publication details
- History: 1987-present
- Publisher: Lippincott Williams & Wilkins
- Frequency: Bimonthly
- Impact factor: 1.158 (2012)

Standard abbreviations
- ISO 4: Clin. Nurse Spec.

Indexing
- ISSN: 0887-6274 (print); 1538-9782 (web)
- OCLC no.: 223196168

Links
- Journal homepage; Online access; Online archive

Clinical Nurse Specialist: The Journal for Advanced Nursing Practice is a bimonthly peer-reviewed nursing journal for clinical nurse specialists.

== See also ==
- List of nursing journals
