= Serrant =

Serrant is a surname. Notable people with the surname include:

- Carl Serrant (born 1975), English footballer and fitness coach
- Joseph Serrant (1767–1827), Martinican-born French Army Officer
- Laura Serrant (born 1963), British nurse and academic
- Maria-Frances Serrant (born 2002), Trinidadian footballer

== See also ==
- Serrano (surname)
