= Sarah H. Kagan =

American nursing academic

- Education: University of Chicago; Rush University; University of California, San Francisco
- Awards: MacArthur Fellow
- Scientific career
- Fields: gerontological nurse
- Workplaces: University of Pennsylvania

Sarah Hope Kagan is an American gerontological nurse who is Lucy Walker Honorary Term Professor of Gerontological Nursing at the University of Pennsylvania.

== Life ==
Kagan teaches students across the baccalaureate, masters and doctoral programs in the School of Nursing as well as offering lectures and clinical preceptorships in the School of Medicine. She is the Director of the Nursing Undergraduate Honors Program and the Penn-UK and Penn Australia Study Abroad Programs in the School of Nursing. Kagan regularly teaches two undergraduate honors courses "Sweet Little Old Ladies and Sandwiched Daughters" and "Ageing, Beauty, and Sexuality". In addition, she directs the advanced qualitative methods course in the PhD program. Kagan teaches a course in comparative health systems and elder care in conjunction with the Departments of Community Medicine and Nursing Studies at the University of Hong Kong.

Kagan's program of clinical research is centered on human experience and illness, with a focus on symptom experience for older adults, particularly those who have cancer. Her second book – published by Penn Press in 2009 – is entitled Cancer in the Lives of Older Americans: Blessings and Battles. Kagan commonly examines the experience of cancer for older adults through naturalistic, interactionist inquiry using head and neck cancer as a model to understand cancer experience in older adults. Her current investigations include collaborative projects to understand embodiment in younger and older individuals who have oral tongue cancer and that of those who have undergone microvascular reconstruction of the oral cavity for oral tongue and mandible cancers.

She graduated from the University of Chicago with an A.B. in 1984, from Rush University with a B.S. in 1986, and from the University of California, San Francisco with an M.S. in 1989 and a Ph.D in 1994.
