= British Journal of Community Nursing =

- Discipline: Nursing
- Language: English

Publication details
- Former name(s): British Journal of Community Health Nursing
- History: 1996–present
- Publisher: MA Healthcare (United Kingdom)
- Frequency: Monthly

Standard abbreviations
- ISO 4: Br. J. Community Nurs.

Indexing
- ISSN: 1462-4753 (print); 2052-2215 (web)

Links
- Journal homepage

The British Journal of Community Nursing is a monthly nursing journal covering clinical and professional issues related to nursing in the home.

It is indexed on MEDLINE and Scopus.
