= Gastrointestinal Nursing =

- Discipline: Gastrointestinal nursing
- Language: English

Publication details
- History: 2003-present
- Publisher: MA Healthcare
- Frequency: 10/year

Standard abbreviations
- ISO 4: Gastrointest. Nurs.

Indexing
- ISSN: 1479-5248
- OCLC no.: 663658982

Links
- Journal homepage; Online access

Gastrointestinal Nursing is a monthly peer-reviewed nursing journal covering research and clinical work on the practice of gastrointestinal nursing. It is published by MA Healthcare. It is indexed in Scopus.
