= Cancer Nursing =

- Discipline: Oncology nursing
- Language: English
- Edited by: Pamela S. Hinds

Publication details
- History: 1978–present
- Publisher: Wolters Kluwer
- Frequency: Bimonthly
- Impact factor: 1.844 (2017)

Standard abbreviations
- ISO 4: Cancer Nurs.

Indexing
- ISSN: 0162-220X (print); 1538-9804 (web)
- LCCN: 78645152
- OCLC no.: 03804001

Links
- Journal homepage

Cancer Nursing is a bi-monthly peer-reviewed nursing journal covering problems arising in the care and support of cancer patients from prevention and early detection to all treatment modalities, and specific nursing interventions. It is published by Wolters Kluwer.

== History ==
The journal was established in 1978, with Rachel Ayers and Carol Reed-Ash as its founding editors. Its current editor-in-chief is Pamela S. Hinds (George Washington University).

== Abstracting and indexing ==
The journal is abstracted and indexed in:

- CINAHL
- MEDLINE
- PubMed

According to the Journal Citation Reports, the journal has a 2017 impact factor of 1.844.
