= Workplace Health & Safety =

- Discipline: Nursing
- Language: English
- Edited by: Joy E. Wachs

Publication details
- Former name(s): AAOHN Journal
- History: 1953–present
- Publisher: SLACK Incorporated (United States)
- Frequency: Monthly

Standard abbreviations
- ISO 4: Workplace Health Saf.

Indexing
- ISSN: 0891-0162
- OCLC no.: 13035605

Links
- Journal homepage

The Workplace Health & Safety (formerly AAOHN Journal) is a monthly peer-reviewed nursing journal and the official of the American Association of Occupational Health Nurses (AAOHN). It covers the field of occupational and environmental health nursing. It is edited by Joy E. Wachs.
