= Western Circle =

British payday loan company

Western Circle Limited
- Trade name: Cashfloat
- Company type: Private
- Industry: Financial services
- Founded: 2014; 12 years ago
- Founder: Jeremy Lloyd
- Headquarters: London, United Kingdom
- Products: Short-term credit, payday loans
- Website: www.cashfloat.co.uk

Western Circle (trading as Cashfloat) is a British payday loan company offering "short-term, high-cost credit". The interest charged by the lender is up to 277.40% pa. The interest is non-compound, as dictated by the FCA. The company declare an APR of 1116% but also claim that the APR measurement is irrelevant for non-compound loans.

The firm operates in the UK market only. The company claims to be technology oriented, and developed its own decision making algorithms.

== History ==
Consumer credit suppliers, like Western Circle, were regulated in the UK by the Office of Fair Trading (OFT) until April 2014, but has since been regulated by the Financial Conduct Authority (FCA). The firm's activity under the OFT was too small to cause any headlines, and hence didn't get direct criticism like more active companies in its sector, such as Wonga. The activity of the company is allied to the strict regulations of the FCA. The new regulations force much fairer practices in comparison to the period up to 2014, and hence no significant complaints arrived to the media.

=== NHS Nurses publication ===
In October 2016, Western circle published a research based on survey done of 160,000 of clients, claiming that the sector of NHS Nurses is heavily dependent on Payday Loans. According to the research, the number of nurses using payday loans has doubled in 3 years, since 2013. This research brought the matter of the small wages given to the nurses in UK to the attention of media outlets. The claims were that nurses' salaries were frozen for more than 6 years, in some cases, and caused them much financial distress. The matter of the NHS continues to be an important issue of public discussion in the UK.

== See also ==
- Credit union
- Wonga
- Dollar Financial Group
- Money Gap Group
- Satsuma Loans
