= Pediatric Nursing (journal) =

- Discipline: Pediatrics, nursing
- Language: English
- Edited by: Judy A. Rollins

Publication details
- Publisher: Jannetti Publications, Inc. (United States)
- Frequency: Bimonthly

Standard abbreviations
- ISO 4: Pediatr. Nurs.

Indexing
- CODEN: PENUEI
- ISSN: 0097-9805
- OCLC no.: 39841876

Links
- Journal homepage; Online access

Pediatric Nursing is a peer-reviewed nursing journal published bimonthly by Jannetti Publications, Inc. Its focus is professional pediatric nursing in clinical practice, education, research, and administration. The editor in chief is Judy A. Rollins. The journal sponsors the Annual Pediatric Nursing Conference.

== See also ==
- List of nursing journals
