= British Journal of Cardiac Nursing =

- Discipline: Cardiac Nursing
- Language: English

Publication details
- History: Launched in January 2006
- Publisher: MA Healthcare Ltd (UK)

Standard abbreviations
- ISO 4: Br. J. Card. Nurs.

Indexing
- ISSN: 1749-6403

Links
- Journal homepage

The British Journal of Cardiac Nursing is a monthly nursing journal which publishes original research and clinical articles relevant to the practice of cardiac nursing.

== See also ==
- Portal:Nursing
- List of nursing journals
