= Nursing Management (journal) =

- Discipline: Nursing management
- Language: English

Publication details
- History: 1994–present
- Publisher: RCNi (United Kingdom)
- Frequency: 10/year

Standard abbreviations
- ISO 4: Nurs. Manag.

Indexing
- ISSN: 0744-6314 (print); 1538-8670 (web)
- OCLC no.: 07831317

Links
- Journal homepage

Nursing Management is a monthly nursing journal covering the practice of nursing management. It is published by RCNi. It continues Supervisor Nurse (ISSN 0039-5870) and absorbed Recruitment, Retention & Restructuring Report.

== See also ==
- List of nursing journals
