= European Journal of Oncology Nursing =

The European Journal of Oncology Nursing is a peer-reviewed medical journal covering cancer research of direct relevance to patient care, nurse education, management, and policy development. It is published by Elsevier. The journal was established in 1997, with Alison Richardson as its founding editor-in-chief. It is the official journal of the European Oncology Nursing Society and its current editor-in-chief is Alex Molassiotis (Hong Kong Polytechnic University).

== Abstracting and indexing ==
The journal is abstracted and indexed in:

- CINAHL
- Current Contents/Social & Behavioral Sciences
- Embase
- Index Medicus/MEDLINE/PubMed
- PsycINFO
- Referativnyi Zhurnal
- Science Citation Index Expanded
- Scopus
- Social Sciences Citation Index

According to the Journal Citation Reports, the journal has a 2018 impact factor of 1.697.
