= Cancer Nursing Practice =

- Discipline: Oncology nursing
- Language: English
- Edited by: Jennifer Sprinks

Publication details
- Publisher: RCNi (United Kingdom)
- Frequency: Monthly

Standard abbreviations
- ISO 4: Cancer Nurs. Pract.

Indexing
- ISSN: 1475-4266 (print); 2047-8933 (web)
- OCLC no.: 54447337

Links
- Journal homepage

Cancer Nursing Practice is a monthly peer-reviewed nursing journal which covers the practice of oncology nursing. It also publishes news, news analysis, and opinion columns on topics relevant to oncology nurses. It is published by RCNi. The editor-in-chief is Jennifer Sprinks. The journal is available by subscription and is a member of the Committee on Publication Ethics.

== See also ==
- List of nursing journals
