= Mental Health Practice =

- Discipline: Mental health nursing
- Language: English

Publication details
- History: 1998–present
- Publisher: RCNi (United Kingdom)
- Frequency: 10/year
- Impact factor: (2014)

Standard abbreviations
- ISO 4: Ment. Health Pract.

Indexing
- ISSN: 1465-8720 (print); 2047-895X (web)
- OCLC no.: 53476420

Links
- Journal homepage; Online access

Mental Health Practice is a monthly nursing journal covering the practice of mental health nursing published by RCNi.
