= European Journal of Cancer Care =

- Discipline: Oncology
- Language: English
- Edited by: David Weller

Publication details
- History: 1992-present
- Publisher: Wiley-Blackwell
- Frequency: Bimonthly
- Impact factor: 1.564 (2014)

Standard abbreviations
- ISO 4: Eur. J. Cancer Care

Indexing
- CODEN: EUCAEU
- ISSN: 0961-5423 (print); 1365-2354 (web)
- OCLC no.: 25449441

Links
- Journal homepage; Online access; Online archive

The European Journal of Cancer Care is a bimonthly peer-reviewed medical journal covering research on cancer care. The editor-in-chief is David Weller (University of Edinburgh). The journal was established in 1992 and is published by Wiley-Blackwell.

== Abstracting and indexing ==
The journal is abstracted and indexed in:

- EBSCO databases
- ProQuet databases
- Current Contents/Clinical Medicine
- InfoTrac
- PsycINFO
- Scopus
- MEDLINE/PubMed
- Science Citation Index Expanded

According to the Journal Citation Reports, the journal has a 2017 impact factor of 2.409.

== See also ==
- European Journal of Cancer
