= Cardiac nursing =

Nursing specialty

Cardiac nursing is a nursing specialty that works with patients who have various conditions of the cardiovascular system. Cardiac nurses help treat conditions such as unstable angina, cardiomyopathy, coronary artery disease, congestive heart failure, myocardial infarction and cardiac dysrhythmia under the direction of a cardiologist.

Cardiac nurses perform postoperative care on a surgical unit, stress test evaluations, cardiac monitoring, vascular monitoring, and health assessments. Cardiac nurses must have Basic Life Support and Advanced Cardiac Life Support certification. In addition, cardiac nurses must possess specialized skills including electrocardiogram monitoring, defibrillation, and medication administration by continuous intravenous drip. Cardiac nurses work in many different environments, including coronary care units (CCU), cardiac catheterization, intensive care units (ICU), operating theatres, cardiac rehabilitation centers, clinical research, cardiac surgery wards, cardiovascular intensive care units (CVICU), and cardiac medical wards.

== See also ==
- British Journal of Cardiac Nursing
