= MCN (journal) =

MCN: The American Journal of Maternal/Child Nursing
- Discipline: Neonatal nursing, Obstetrical nursing
- Language: English
- Edited by: Kathleen Rice Simpson, PhD, RNC, FAAN

Publication details
- Publisher: Lippincott Williams & Wilkins (United States)
- Frequency: Bimonthly
- Impact factor: 2.2 (2024)

Standard abbreviations
- ISO 4: MCN

Indexing
- ISSN: 0361-929X (print); 1539-0683 (web)
- OCLC no.: 2134192

Links
- Journal homepage; Online access; Online archive

MCN: The American Journal of Maternal/Child Nursing is a bimonthly peer-reviewed healthcare journal of obstetrical nursing and neonatal nursing.

== See also ==
- Journal of Obstetric, Gynecologic, & Neonatal Nursing
- Neonatal Network: The Journal of Neonatal Nursing
- List of nursing journals
