= Nurse Researcher =

- Discipline: Nursing
- Language: English

Publication details
- Publisher: RCNi (United Kingdom)
- Frequency: Bimonthly

Standard abbreviations
- ISO 4: Nurse Res.

Indexing
- ISSN: 1351-5578

Links
- Journal homepage

Nurse Researcher is a bimonthly nursing journal published by RCNi. It covers research methodology and relevant to the practice of nursing research.

== See also ==
- List of nursing journals
