= Perianesthesia nursing =

Nursing specialty practice area

Perianesthesia nursing is a nursing specialty practice area concerned with providing nursing care to patients undergoing or recovering from anesthesia. Perianesthesia nursing encompasses several subspecialty practice areas and represents a diverse number of practice environments and skill sets.

== Work Environments ==
The core ideology of the American Society of PeriAnesthesia Nurses (ASPAN) is to serve nurses "practicing in all phases of preanesthesia and postanesthesia care, ambulatory surgery, and pain management."

The National Association of PeriAnesthesia Nurses of Canada (NAPAN©) promotes leadership to PeriAnesthesia nurses (from the PreAdmission/PreOperative Phase through to the Anesthesia Phase and all of the PostAnesthesia phases) in education, research and adapting to evolving practices in client and health services needs within the Canadian health care system.

=== Preoperative assessment ===
Nurses are responsible for a large amount of the assessment done in pre-operative clinics, where patients are evaluated for the ability to tolerate anesthetic and screened for factors which may affect the course of the anesthetic experience.

=== Post anesthesia care unit ===
Nurses provide extensive care to patients in the early stages of emergence from anesthetic and in the immediate post-operative period until they are deemed stable enough to safely transfer to other areas.

=== Ambulatory care ===
There is a large number of procedures that are performed on an outpatient basis where the patient is not expected to require hospitalization after the procedure. Examples include dental, gynecological, and diagnostic imaging clinics.

=== Pain management ===
Pain management nurses are sometimes considered to be perianesthesia nurses, given the collaborative nature of their work with anesthetists and the fact that a large proportion of acute pain issues are surgery related. However, distinct pain management certifications exist through the American Society for Pain Management Nurses.

== Training and Certification ==
Both registered nurses and licensed practical nurses work in some perianesthesia areas. Beyond active registration in good standing, educational and specialized training requirements vary by jurisdiction and practice setting. Many institutions require specialized training in areas such as cardiac and invasive monitoring, administration of intravenous push medications, as well as CPR and ACLS. In the United States, RNs can receive specialty certification through the American Society of PeriAnesthesia Nurses (ASPAN) as either Certified PostAnesthesia Nurses (CPAN) or Certified Ambulatory PeriAnesthesia Nurses (CAPA).

In Canada, the Canadian Nurses Association has recently added peri- or post-anesthesia nursing as a certified specialty with the first Certification qualification examination currently being offered (registration fall, 2013 with exam date April 5, 2014). The Canadian certification is PeriAnesthesia Nurse Certified (Canada), or PANC(C).

== See also ==
- Perioperative nursing
