= British Nursing Index =

Database

- Producer: ProQuest (United Kingdom)
- History: 1996 to present
- Languages: English

Access
- Cost: subscription

Coverage
- Disciplines: nursing and midwifery
- Format coverage: Journal articles
- Temporal coverage: 1985 to present
- Update frequency: Monthly

Links
- Website: proquest.libguides.com/BNI
- Title list(s): www.proquest.com/documents/Title_List_-_British_Nursing_Index.html

The British Nursing Index (BNI) is a bibliographic database of nursing and midwifery journal articles. The index contains details of English language articles from 1985 to the present, and is updated monthly. As of 2016, the database covers more than 700 journal titles, over half of which are current publications.

In 1991, the Nursing and Midwifery Index (NMI) was created by health librarians at Poole Hospital, Salisbury District Hospital and Bournemouth University; this became a database in 1994.

The BNI database was formed in 1996 with the merging of the Nursing and Midwifery Index database and the Royal College of Nursing's Nursing Bibliography. The BNI database was launched on 1 January 1997 and covered 220 journals. As of September 2013, 81 of the journal titles indexed by BNI are not covered by the CINAHL databases, and 51 of these are published in the UK.
