= Evidence-Based Nursing (journal) =

- Discipline: Evidence-based nursing
- Language: English
- Edited by: Dr. Ben Parkinson

Publication details
- History: 1998-present
- Publisher: BMJ Publishing Group and RCN Publishing
- Frequency: Quarterly

Standard abbreviations
- ISO 4: Evid.-Based Nurs.

Indexing
- ISSN: 1367-6539 (print); 1468-9618 (web)
- OCLC no.: 38524057

Links
- Journal homepage; Online access; Online archive

Evidence-Based Nursing is a peer-reviewed healthcare journal covering the field of evidence-based nursing. It is published quarterly by the BMJ Publishing Group and RCN Publishing. It is abstracted and indexed by Index Medicus (MEDLINE), Scopus and Excerpta Medica/EMBASE.

The journal performs systematic searches of nursing and medical journals. The selection of content is determined upon the validity and relevance related to nursing science. Submissions are not accepted and are only commissioned.
