= Journal of Child Health Care =

- Discipline: Paediatric health care
- Language: English
- Edited by: Stephen McKeever

Publication details
- History: 1997-present
- Publisher: SAGE Publications in association with the Association of British Paediatric Nurses (United Kingdom)
- Frequency: Quarterly
- Impact factor: 1.9 (2025)

Standard abbreviations
- ISO 4: J. Child Health Care

Indexing
- ISSN: 1367-4935 (print); 1741-2889 (web)
- LCCN: sn98040952
- OCLC no.: 49941706

Links
- Journal homepage; Online access; Online archive

The Journal of Child Health Care is a quarterly peer-reviewed medical journal covering the field of paediatric health care. The Editor-in-Chief is Associate Professor Stephen McKeever. The journal was established in 1997 and is published by SAGE Publications in association with the Association of British Paediatric Nurses.

== Abstracting and indexing ==
Journal of Child Health Care is abstracted and indexed in Scopus, Science Citation Index Expanded, and the Social Sciences Citation Index. According to the Journal Citation Reports, its 2025 impact factor is 1.9 .
