= Professional magazine =

A professional magazine or professional journal is a periodical published by the governing body of a profession. The standard of quality of such a periodical may be similar to that of a scholarly publication.

A professional journal is said to be one which is "published by the profession and for the profession", which cannot be charged with being dominated by trade, and which "serves a higher and therefore a better use" than a so-called trade journal "by printing in an unbiased way the subject matter".
