= Royal College of Nursing =

British union for nurses

Coordinates: 51.516134°N 0.145786°W

RCN
- Royal College of Nursing
- Predecessor: College of Nursing Ltd
- Founded: 27 March 1916; 110 years ago
- Founder: Dame Sarah Swift; Sir Arthur Stanley
- Headquarters: Cavendish Square, London
- Location: United Kingdom
- Members: ▲589,717 (2024)
- General Secretary: Professor Nicola Ranger
- Publication: Nursing Standard
- Website: rcn.org.uk

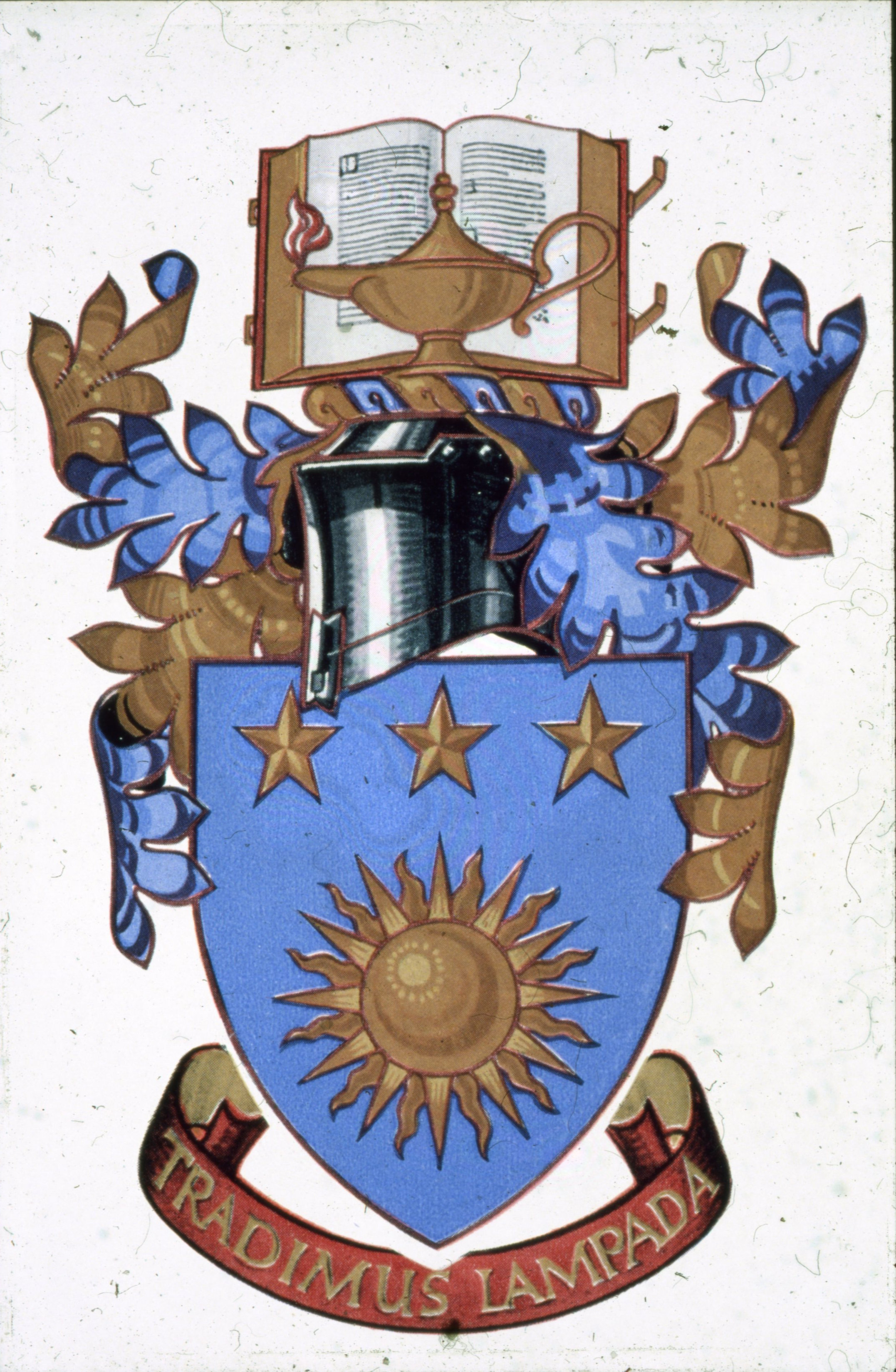
Coat of arms

The Royal College of Nursing (RCN) is a registered trade union and professional body in the United Kingdom for those in the profession of nursing. It was founded in 1916 as the College of Nursing, receiving its royal charter in 1928. Queen Elizabeth II was the patron until her death in 2022, King Charles III continued the royal connection and became patron in 2024. The majority of members are registered nurses; however student nurses and healthcare assistants are also members. There is also a category of membership, at a reduced cost, for retired people.

The RCN describes its mission as representing nurses and nursing, promoting excellence in practice and shaping health policies. It has a network of stewards, safety representatives and union learning representatives as well as advice services for members. Services include a main library in London, and regional libraries. The RCN Institute provides courses for nurses.

== History ==
The College of Nursing Ltd was founded on 27 March 1916, with 34 members, as a professional organisation for trained nurses. On a proposal from Dame Sarah Swift (then matron of Guy's Hospital ) and Arthur Stanley, chairman of the Joint War Organisation, developed with Rachael Cox-Davies (matron of the Royal Free Hospital) and Alicia Lloyd-Still (matron of St. Thomas Hospital ) the College was founded with articles of association. The objectives of the College were 1) to promote better education and training of nurses, 2) to promote uniformity of curriculum, 3) to recognise approved nursing schools, 4) to make and maintain a register of persons who had certificates of proficiency in nursing and 5) promote bills in parliament in support of the interests of the nursing profession. Eleven matrons signed the founding articles of Association, one of whom was Margaret Elwyn Sparshott. It attempted amalgamation with the Royal British Nurses' Association, but this was frustrated, largely by the efforts of Ethel Gordon Fenwick. In March 1917 the college had 2,553 members and, by 1919, 13,047, a great deal more than the RBNA. It had most of the nursing places on the General Nursing Council when it was first established, and by 1925 it had about 24,000 members. Membership was restricted to registered general nurses. The college initially excluded male nurses, and those on the mental, mental subnormality, fever and children's nurses' registers from membership. Annie Warren Gill was one of the founders of the Scottish board of the College of Nursing which held its first meeting on 1 November 1916 in Edinburgh. She was instrumental in setting up local branches in Scotland to increase membership. Gill also proposed in 1922 that married members be considered part of the College, having realised that there would be a nursing shortage following World War 1.

In 1920, Annie Pearson, Viscountess Cowdray bought 20 Cavendish Square, the former London home of H. H. Asquith, for the College's use after Rachael Cox-Davies had urged her to support a new home for the growing organisation. The Cowdray Club, formally the Nation's Nurses and Professional Women's Club, opened there in 1922 as a club for nurses and other professional women. Pearson also funded the 1921–1922 rebuilding along Henrietta Street to create headquarters for the College of Nursing.

A royal charter was granted in 1928.The organisation became the College of Nursing and Frances Goodall its Assistant General Secretary. The college pushed for registered nurses to be given precedence, and to be in charge. In 1935 Frances Goodall became General Secretary and the Trades Union Congress promoted a Parliamentary bill to secure a 48-hour working week for all hospital employees. The college opposed this and was accused by the TUC of being "an organisation of voluntary snobs". In 1939 the college's name was changed to “the Royal College of Nursing”. The Ministry of Health guaranteed a salary of £40 to nursing students in training in 1941, about double what voluntary hospitals were paying before the war. The College said that this was too high. In 1943 the College held nine seats to represent 'employees' on the Nurses Salaries Committee chaired by Lord Rushcliffe which published two reports in 1943. In the 1940s the College joined efforts by the Equal Pay Campaign Committee to secure equal pay for public sector employees, particularly women civil servants, teachers and nurses, which in 1955 was agreed by government to be implemented in stages. In 1963, active RCN member Grace Margery Westbrook became the first practising nurse to be elected Chair of the Staff Side Committee, Nurses and Midwives Whitley Council 1963-1969; her RCN activities had included being elected Council member representing Southern England in 1959. In 1974 the RCN's 'Fair Pay for Nurses' campaign and 'The State of Nursing' report contributed to Barbara Castle commissioning the Government's Halsbury Report into nurses' pay and conditions; it resulted in an average pay increase of 33 per cent for nurses.

Since 1977 the RCN has been registered as a trade union.

=== 21st century ===
In 2010 the RCN's charitable activities were transferred to an independent charity, the RCN Foundation (RCNF).

In 2018, after a pay agreement was not clearly explained to the membership, the Chief Executive and General Secretary Janet Davies resigned and Dame Donna Kinnair was appointed in an acting capacity. She was confirmed in the role in April 2019. A motion of no confidence in the RCN Council was called shortly afterwards and passed in September 2018 with 78% of votes, but on a turnout when only 3.7% of the membership voted. As well as the Chief Executive and General Secretary, the Director of Member Relations had previously resigned. Twelve of the 17 council members resigned, 10 of them standing for re-election in the subsequent election.

In 2019, the RCN's first strike – limited to Northern Ireland, over staffing and pay issues – took place.

In May 2019, the Royal College of Nursing voted to back the “decriminalisation” of prostitution.

In April 2021, Pat Cullen started acting as General Secretary & Chief Executive, and was appointed as interim General Secretary & Chief Executive in July 2021.

In August 2021, the RCN cancelled its annual meeting of members in Liverpool following allegations of sexual harassment and said the 2021 Congress would now be held virtually in order to safeguard those attending.

In 2022, the RCN held a strike ballot over pay, held separately across NHS trusts and boards. Its members went on strike as part of the 2022–2023 National Health Service strikes. The RCN commented that from 2010 (the start of the government's austerity programme) to 2022, pay for nurses had fallen by 20%. The government offered a 5% pay rise to most Agenda for Change classes; the RCN demanded a pay rise of retail price index inflation plus five per cent. Around 60 per cent of NHS workplaces in England reached the turnout necessary to legally strike. Outside of Scotland—where the government began negotiations over its 7.5 per cent offer—strikes took place on 15 and 20 December 2022. In England, further strikes took place in January and February 2023.

== Offices ==
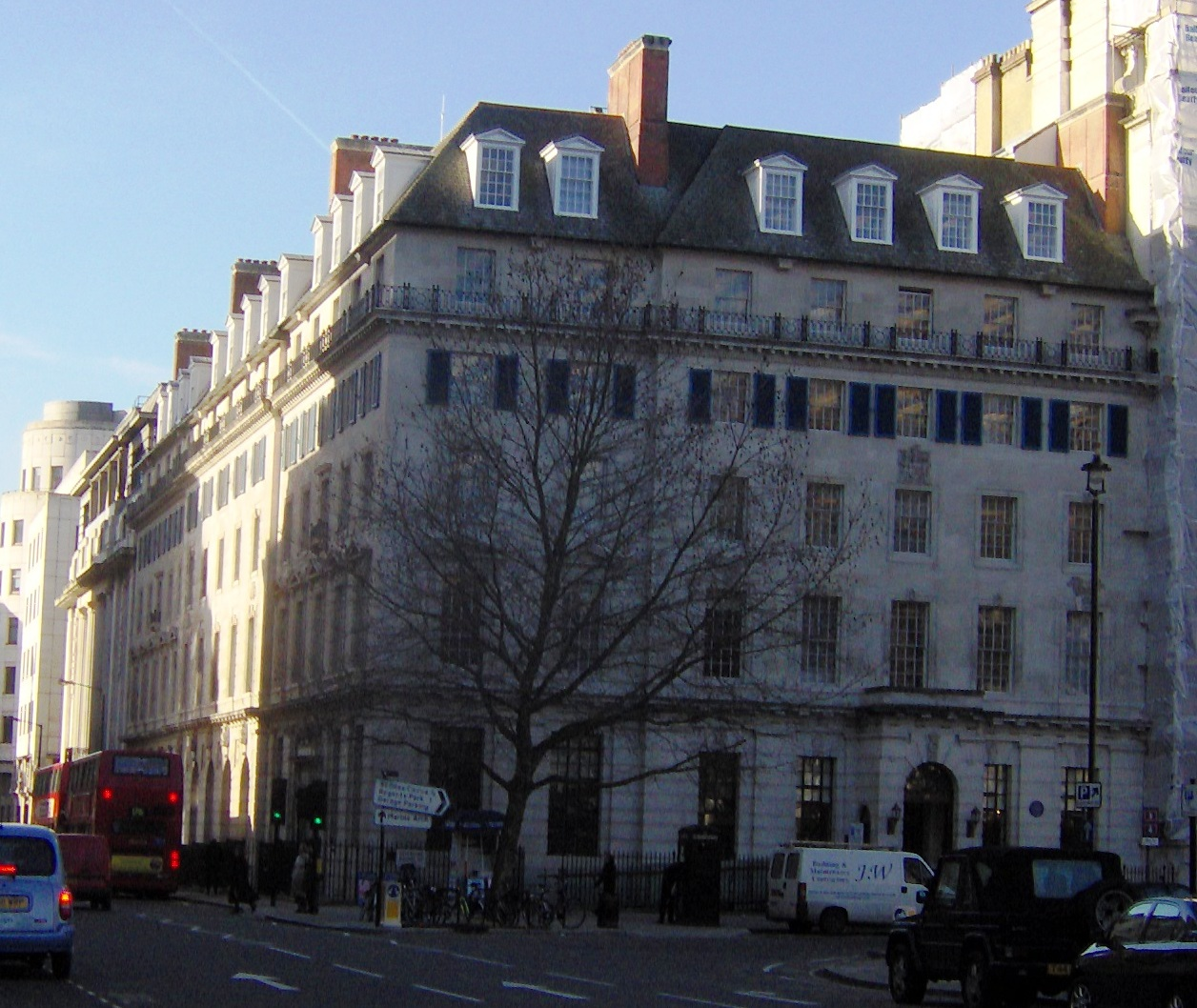
RCN HQ, Cavendish Square London

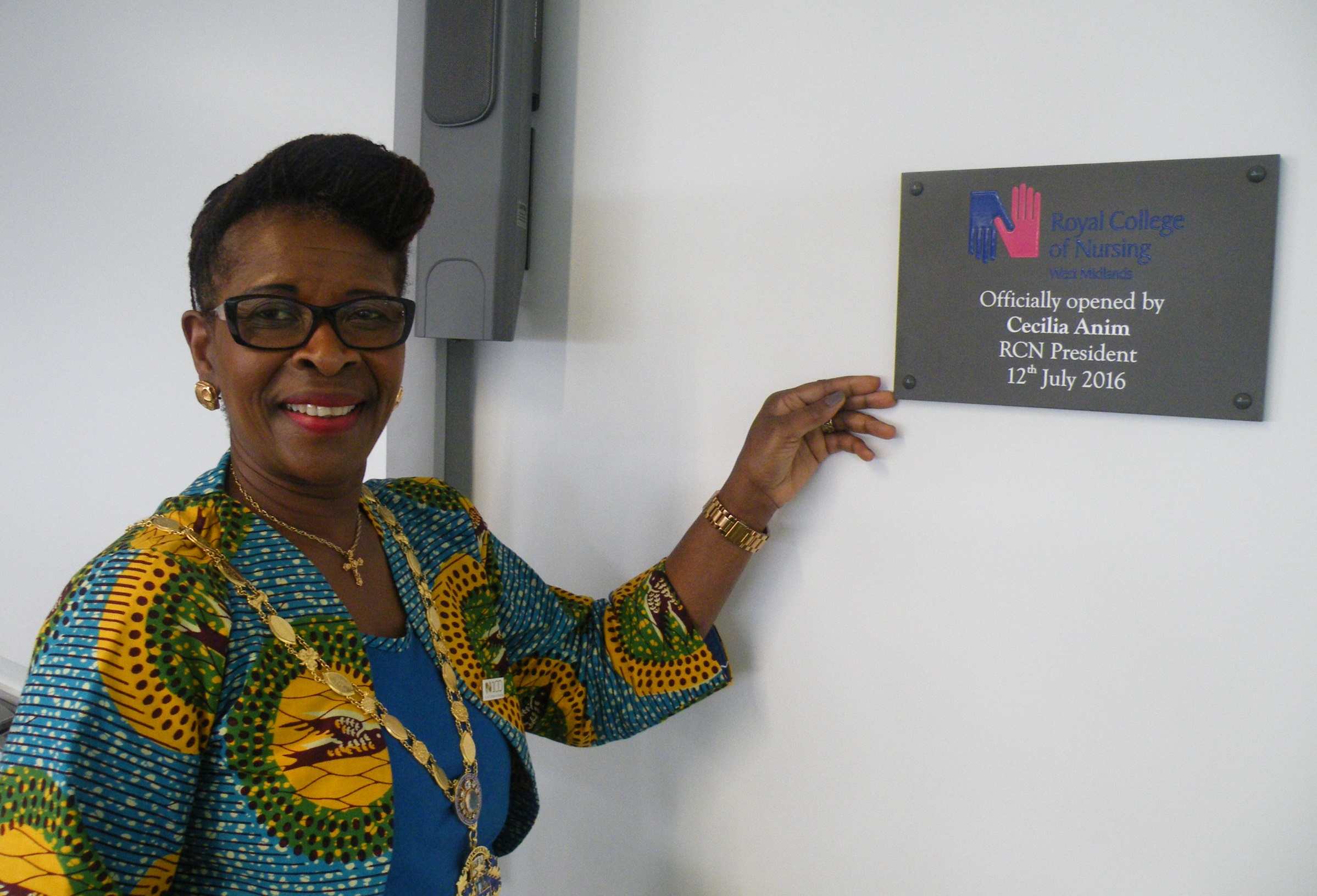
Then-President of the RCN Cecilia Anim opening the RCN's West Midlands office in 2016

The UK headquarters are at 20 Cavendish Square, London, a Grade II listed building. The site was bought for the College of Nursing in 1920 by Annie Pearson, Viscountess Cowdray, and the Cowdray Club occupied part of the premises from 1922 until the 1970s. This also serves as the England HQ and London region offices.

Additional country headquarters are based in Edinburgh, Cardiff and Belfast.

Additional England regional offices are located in Birmingham, Bolton, Bury St Edmunds, Croydon, Exeter, Leeds, Newbury, Nottingham, and Sunderland.

== Council ==
The RCN is governed by its Council. Council members represent members, making decisions that meet the RCN's legal and statutory requirements. These include responsibilities as set out in the royal charter and in trade union legislation.

As of 2024 Council is made up of 17 elected members. 14 of these members are elected directly to the role. 12 are elected by the geographical sections (Scotland, Wales, Northern Ireland and 9 English regions). One member is elected by student members (RCN Students). One member is elected by Nursing Support Worker members. These 14 members choose 3 Council officers from among themselves for the roles of Chair of Council, Vice Chair of Council and Honorary Treasurer.

All RCN members elect the final three roles of RCN President, RCN Deputy President, and the Chair of RCN Congress (non-voting).

The RCN's General Secretary is appointed by Council. Council members are not paid to serve on Council but voluntarily give up their time to serve the RCN and its members, in their governance role.

=== Chairs of Council (since 2005) ===
- 2005–2013 Sandra James
- 2013–2018 Michael Brown
- 2018–2019 Maria Nicholson
- 2019–2023 Sue Warner
- 2024–2025 Paul Vaughan
- 2025–present Carmel O'Boyle

== Presidents ==
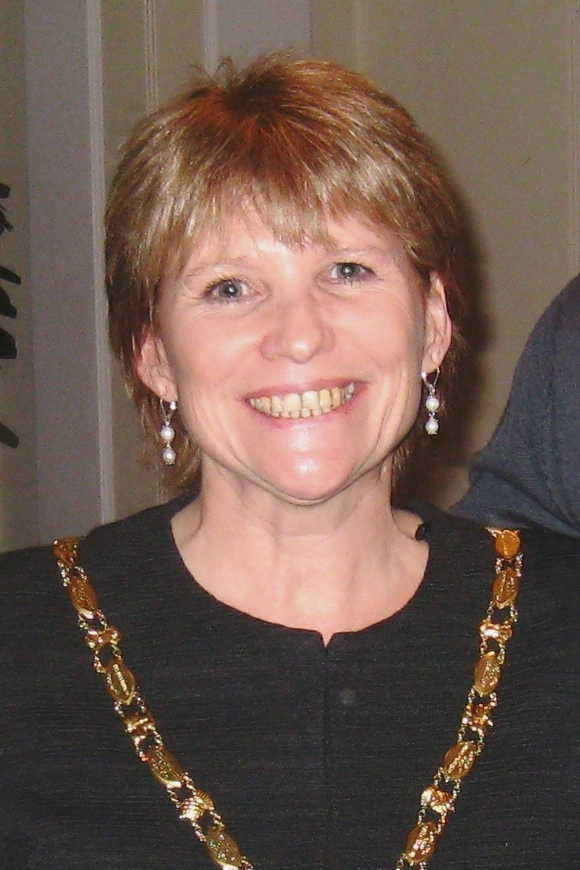
Previous RCN President Andrea Spyropoulos at the 2010 AGM

- 1922–1925 Dame Sidney Browne
- 1925–1927 Dame Sarah Swift
- 1927–1929 Annie Warren Gill
- 1929–1930 Rachael Cox-Davies
- 1930–1933 Margaret Elwyn Sparshott
- 1933–1934 Edith MacGregor Rome
- 1934–1935 Rachael Cox-Davies
- 1935–1937 Dorothy S. Coode
- 1937–1938 Edith MacGregor Rome
- 1938–1940 Beatrice Monk
- 1940–1942 Mary Jones
- 1942–1944 Emily E. P. MacManus
- 1944–1946 Mildred F. Hughes
- 1946–1948 Gladys V. L. Hillyers
- 1948–1950 Dame Louisa Wilkinson
- 1950–1952 Lucy Duff Grant
- 1952–1954 Lucy J. Ottley
- 1954–1956 Sybil C. Bovill
- 1956–1958 Gertrude M.Godden
- 1958–1960 Marjorie J. Marriott
- 1960–1962 Margaret J. Smith
- 1962–1963 Marjorie J. Marriott
- 1963–1964 Mabel Gordon Lawson
- 1964–1966 Florence Udell
- 1966–1968 Theodora Turner
- 1968–1972 Mary Blakeley
- 1972–1976 Dame Winifred Prentice
- 1976–1980 Eirlys M Rees
- 1981–1982 Marian K. Morgan
- 1982–1987 Dame Sheila Quinn
- 1988–1990 Maude Storey
- 1990–1994 Professor Dame June Clark
- 1994–1998 Professor Dame Betty Kershaw
- 1999–2000 Christine Watson
- 2000–2002 Roswyn Hakesley-Brown
- 2002–2006 Sylvia Denton
- 2006–2010 Maura Buchanan
- 2010–2014 Andrea Spyropoulos
- 2015–2019 Cecilia Anim
- 2019–2021 Dame Anne Marie Rafferty
- 2021–2022 Denise Chaffer
- 2023–2024 Sheila Sobrany
- 2024–present Bejoy Sebastian

== Chief Executive & General Secretary ==
- 1916–1935 Mary Snell Rundle
- 1935–1957 Frances Goodall
- 1957–1982 Dame Catherine M. Hall
- 1982–1989 Trevor Clay
- 1989–2001 Christine Hancock
- 2001–2007 Beverly Malone
- 2007–2015 Peter Carter
- 2015–2018 Janet Davies
- 2018–2021 Dame Donna Kinnair (interim August 2018 to April 2019)
- 2021–2024 Pat Cullen
- 2024–present Nicola Ranger

== RCN libraries ==
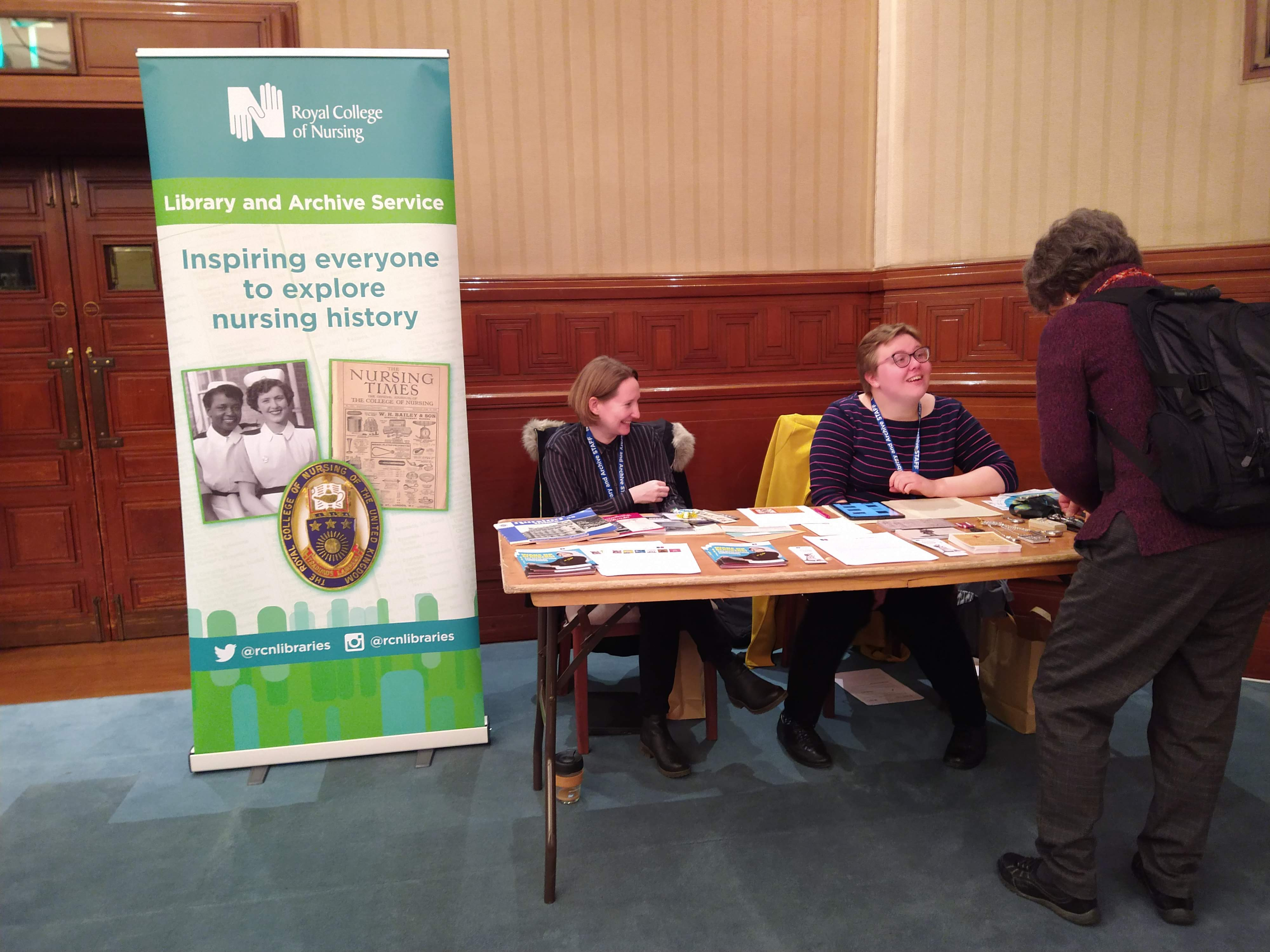
RCN Library and Archives at the Senate House History Day, 2019

The RCN has four physical libraries in London, Cardiff, Belfast and Edinburgh. The largest of these is in London, which is also responsible for the online library services. The London library was founded in 1921, and claims to hold Europe's largest nursing library resource.

Due to its Museum holdings, the Library is a member of The London Museums of Health & Medicine group. Special collections include the printed Historical Collection and the RCN Steinberg Collection of Nursing Research, the latter of which comprises over 1,000 nursing theses and dissertations 1950s-2010s.

The RCN Archive is physically held in Edinburgh, with services increasing available online.

== Fellowships ==
Fellowships are selectively awarded by the RCN in recognition of exceptional contributions to nursing. Honorary fellowships are granted by the RCN Council to those who are unable to become an RCN member, either because they are from overseas or because they work outside the nursing profession. Only a small number of fellows are elected each year. For example, in 2021, 11 fellows and two honorary fellows were elected, and in 2022, five fellows and three honorary fellows were elected.

Fellows and honorary fellows are entitled to use the postnominal FRCN or FRCN(hon) as appropriate.

== RCN publications ==
As at 2024 the RCN produces an online member publication RCN Magazine (formerly RCN Bulletin).

RCNi (previously RCN Publishing) produces Nursing Standard, which is available through subscription and on news stands. It also publishes a range of journals for specialist nurses: Cancer Nursing Practice, Emergency Nurse, Learning Disability Practice, Mental Health Practice, Nursing Children and Young People, Nursing Management, Nursing Older People, Nurse Researcher and Primary Health Care.

== See also ==
- List of nursing organisations in the United Kingdom
