= CINAHL =

Database of nursing and health literature

- Producer: EBSCO (United States)
- History: 1961–present

Access
- Providers: EBSCO
- Cost: subscription

Coverage
- Disciplines: nursing and allied health
- Format coverage: journal articles
- Temporal coverage: 1937–present

Links
- Website: ebscohost.com/cinahl
- Title list(s): www.ebsco.com/title-lists

CINAHL (Cumulative Index to Nursing and Allied Health Literature) is an index of English-language and selected other-language journal articles about nursing, allied health, biomedicine, and healthcare.

Ella Crandall, Mildred Grandbois, and Mollie Sitner began a card index of articles from nursing journals in the 1940s. The index was first published as Cumulative Index to Nursing Literature (CINL) in 1961. The title changed to Cumulative Index to Nursing and Allied Health Literature in 1977 when its scope was expanded to include allied health journals. The index first went online in 1984.

The publisher, Cinahl Information Systems, was acquired by EBSCO Publishing in 2003.

CINAHL has been provided on the Web by EBSCO Publishing, Ovid Technologies, and ProQuest, in addition to Cinahl Information Systems, and also provided online by DataStar from Dialog. In 2006, EBSCO announced its intention to not renew the distribution agreements with the other providers and to make CINAHL available exclusively on the EBSCOhost platform.

== See also ==
- List of academic databases and search engines
