= Karen Hoare =

Nurse practitioner & medical researcher at Massey University in New Zealand

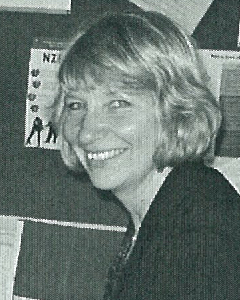
- Hoare in 2006
- Born: Karen Jean Ball; Warwickshire, England
- Spouse: Simon Hoare (m. 1985)

Academic background
- Education: Monash University
- Thesis: Reciprocal role modelling: A constructivist grounded theory (2011)
- Doctoral advisor: Karen Francis; Bruce Arroll

Karen Jean Hoare (née Ball) is a New Zealand professor at Massey University, and is New Zealand's first active nurse practitioner to also be a professor. Her research focuses on models for care for children and young people.

== Early life ==
Hoare was born and raised near Coventry, England, and wanted to be a nurse from an early age.

== Career ==
Hoare initially trained as a paediatric nurse at Great Ormond Street Hospital in London, graduating in 1978, and worked there in the paediatric oncology ward before training as a health visitor. During the 1980s, Hoare and her husband, Simon, a paediatrician whom she married in 1985, spent two years at a research field station in the Gambia, where Hoare's role was described as "useful wife". Her husband was the only doctor at the station, and so when the numbers of children's cases rose in the wet season, Hoare learned advanced assessments skills in order to run her own children's clinics. Noticing a lack of health literacy, Hoare also set up a rolling eight-week course of health education sessions for mothers, focusing on such issues as hygiene, immunisations, family planning and common childhood diseases. When she returned to assess the impact of this work in 1997, she found it was still causing a "massive reduction" in childhood infectious diseases. Hoare says it was important that she was both a mother (she had two young children at the time), learned the local language, and worked with local women to deliver the programme.

Hoare and her family returned to England in 1991, where she had her third child, and completed a master's degree. After Hoare qualified as a nurse presciber in the late 1990s she took on a role persuading other nurses to take on a prescribing role. She said "You know how nurses have to fight to become prescribers here [New Zealand]? [There,] I had to fight to get them to prescribe". Emigrating to New Zealand, Hoare arrived the year that the role of prescribing nurse practitioners was established, 1993. She worked as an academic nurse at the University of Auckland, and then joined the Greenstone Family Clinic in Manurewa, where she is a practising partner.

Hoare joined Massey University in 2017, rising to full professor in 2021. She is Massey University's Director of Postgraduate Nursing, and leader of the final year Nurse Practitioner Programme. She is New Zealand's first professor and active nurse practitioner.

Hoare's research covers investigating young people's views on the dissemination of information about sexually transmitted diseases, and whether treating infants with paracetamol or ibuprofen increases the incidence of childhood asthma. She also works with researchers at the University of Cape Town and James Cook University to build support for children's nursing in the Pacific. In 2012, Hoare completed her PhD through Monash University.

== Awards ==
In 2021, Hoare was a finalist for Nurse Practitioner of the Year at the New Zealand Primary Healthcare Awards.

== Selected works ==
- Gemma Aburn; Gott, Caryl Merryn; Hoare, Karen (2016). "What is resilience? An Integrative Review of the empirical literature". Journal of Advanced Nursing. 72 (5): 980–1000. doi:10.1111/jan.12888. PMID 26748456. Wikidata Q38691186.
- Kim Ward; Gott, Caryl Merryn; Hoare, Karen (2015). "Participants' views of telephone interviews within a grounded theory study". Journal of Advanced Nursing. 71 (12): 2775–2785. doi:10.1111/jan.12748. PMID 26256835. Wikidata Q40643418.
- Hoare, Karen; Mills, Jane; Karen Francis; Karen Francis (2012). "Dancing with data: an example of acquiring theoretical sensitivity in a grounded theory study". International Journal of Nursing Practice. 18 (3): 240–245. doi:10.1111/j.1440-172x.2012.02038.x. PMID 22621293. Wikidata Q34279002.
- Hoare, Karen; Mills, Jane; Karen Francis; Karen Francis (2011). "The role of Government policy in supporting nurse-led care in general practice in the United Kingdom, New Zealand and Australia: an adapted realist review". Journal of Advanced Nursing. 68 (5): 963–980. doi:10.1111/j.1365-2648.2011.05870.x. PMID 22070658. Wikidata Q37954429.
- Karen J. Hoare; Buetow, Stephen A.; Mills, Jane; Francis, Karen (2012). "Using an emic and etic ethnographic technique in a grounded theory study of information use by practice nurses in New Zealand". Journal of Research in Nursing. 18 (8): 720–731. doi:10.1177/1744987111434190. Wikidata Q59834333.
- Stephen Buetow; Jutel, Annemarie; Hoare, Karen (2008). "Shrinking social space in the doctor-modern patient relationship: a review of forces for, and implications of, homologisation". Patient Education and Counseling. 74 (1): 97–103. doi:10.1016/j.pec.2008.07.053. PMID 18789627. Wikidata Q37267826.
- Kim Ward; Hoare, Karen; Gott, Caryl Merryn (2014). "What is known about the experiences of using CPAP for OSA from the users' perspective? A systematic integrative literature review". Sleep Medicine Reviews. 18 (4): 357–366. doi:10.1016/j.smrv.2014.01.001. PMID 24581718. Wikidata Q38192183.
