= Fingleton =

Fingleton is a surname. Notable people with the surname include:

- Diane Fingleton (born 1947), Queensland judge
- Eamonn Fingleton (born 1948), Irish journalist and author
- Jack Fingleton (1908–1981), Australian cricketer, journalist and commentator
- James Fingleton (1876–1920), New South Wales politician
- John Fingleton (economist) (born 1965), Irish-British economist
- Michael Fingleton (1938–2026), chief executive of Irish Nationwide Building Society
- Neil Fingleton (1980–2017), English actor and basketball player
- Sean Fingleton (born 1950), Irish visual artist
- Tony Fingleton, Australian swimmer

== See also ==
- Ingleton (disambiguation)
