= Sonja McIlfatrick =

British nurse and academic (born 1969)

Sonja McIlfatrick MBE FRCN
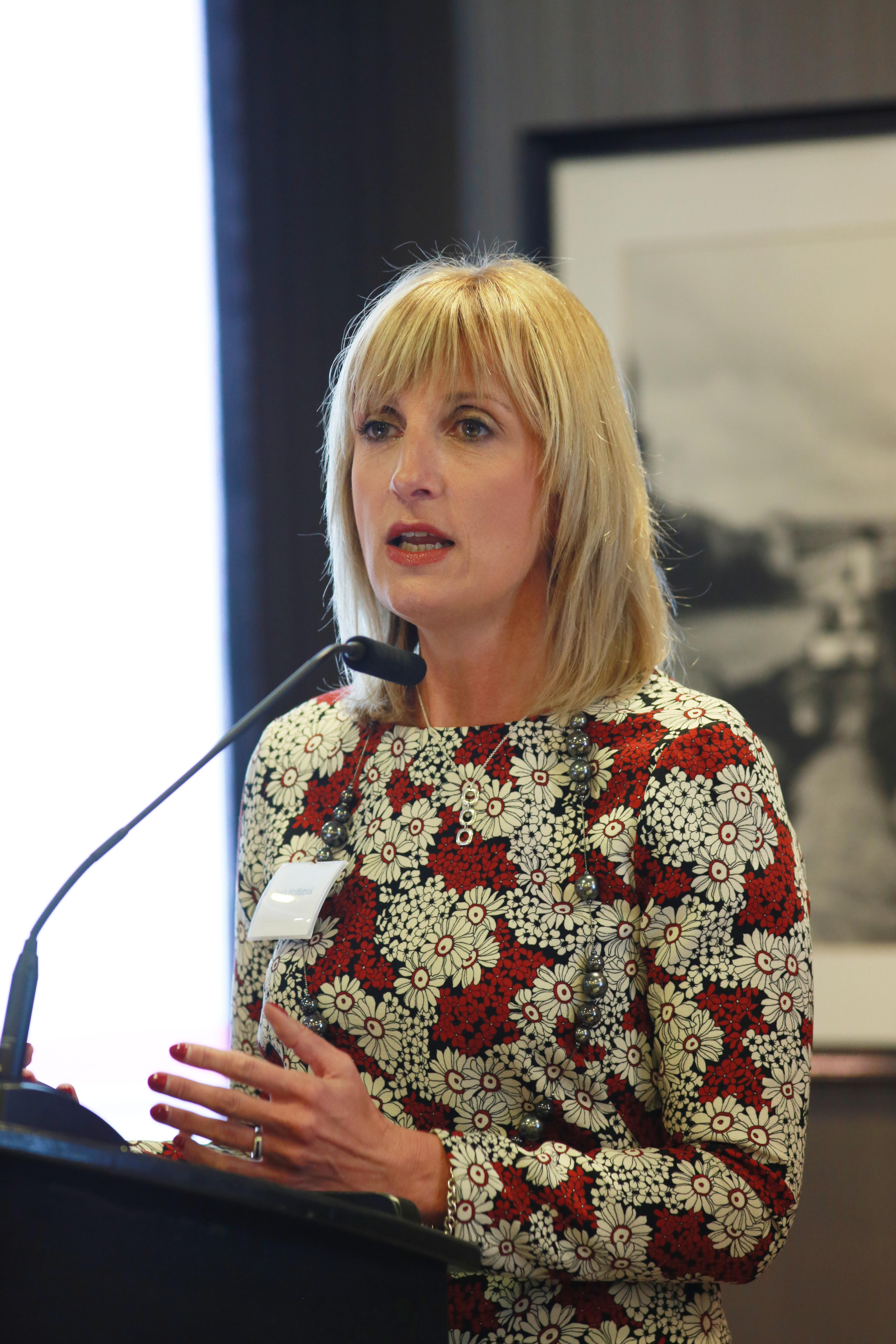
- Born: 30 March 1969 (age 57); Belfast, County Antrim, Northern Ireland
- Citizenship: British; Irish
- Known for: Research on Chronic illness and Palliative care
- Spouse: Alan McIlfatrick

Academic background
- Education: Ulster University
- Doctoral advisor: Hugh McKenna

Academic work
- Discipline: Nursing
- Institutions: Ulster University
- Website: pure.ulster.ac.uk/en/persons/sonja-mc-ilfatrick

Sonja Jayne McIlfatrick MBE FRCN is a nurse and Professor in Nursing and Palliative Care and Dean of Ulster Doctoral College at Ulster University. She was the first non-American President of the International Network of Doctoral Education in Nursing.

== Education ==
She attended Carrickfergus Grammar School in Northern Ireland. She started her nursing degree in the 1980s, and completed a four-year degree at Ulster University. She earned a bachelor's degree in nursing, which inspired her interest in research. She eventually completed a doctorate in research, where she explored the experiences of patients, caregivers and nurses during day hospital chemotherapy.

== Professional life ==
McIlfatrick is a Registered Nurse and holds a BSc in nursing (1991) and a MSc in Advanced Nursing (1999) both from Ulster University where she also earned her PhD (2023) before being appointed to the faculty at Ulster University. She was made Professor in 2013. During her leadership of the All Ireland Institute of Hospice and Palliative Care she established a focussed research network. Her research considers chronic illness and palliative care and she has argued that palliative nursing should be part of education and training. McIlfatrick holds visiting positions in Slovenia and Australia. She is an editorial board member of the Journal of Advanced Nursing the International Journal of Palliative Nursing, Annals of Palliative Medicine and the Journal of Pain and Symptom Management.

== Awards and recognition ==
In 2003 McIlfatrick was awarded the Royal College of Nursing Nurse Researcher of the Year award. She was elected Fellow of the Royal College of Nursing in 2020. She is also a Fellow of the American Academy of Nursing (2020), a Fellow of the Higher Education Academy (2011) and a Fellow of the Royal College of Surgeons in Ireland Faculty of Nursing and Midwifery ad eundem (2007). In 2022 she was awarded the MBE for services to nursing.

== Personal life ==
McIlfatrick has said that she was always interested in working with people in the healthcare sector. She is married to Alan McIlfatrick and they have two sons.

== Select publications ==
- Sonja McIlfatrick (2007). "Assessing palliative care needs: views of patients, informal carers and healthcare professionals". Journal of Advanced Nursing. 57 (1): 77–86. doi:10.1111/j.1365-2648.2006.04062.x. PMID 17184376. Wikidata Q79446939.
- Sonja McIlfatrick; Noble, Helen; Noleen K McCorry; Roulston, Audrey; Felicity Hasson; Dorry McLaughlin; Gail Johnston; Lesley Rutherford; Payne, Cathy; Kernohan, George; Sheila Kelly; Avril Craig (2013). "Exploring public awareness and perceptions of palliative care: a qualitative study". Palliative Medicine. 28 (3): 273–280. doi:10.1177/0269216313502372. PMID 24026003. Wikidata Q85734191.
- Sonja McIlfatrick; Felicity Hasson; Dorry McLaughlin; Gail Johnston; Roulston, Audrey; Lesley Rutherford; Noble, Helen; Sheila Kelly; Avril Craig; Kernohan, George (2013). "Public awareness and attitudes toward palliative care in Northern Ireland". BMC Palliative Care. 12 (1): 34. doi:10.1186/1472-684x-12-34. PMC 3848719. PMID 24044631. Wikidata Q37359785.
