= JCN =

JCN may refer to:

- Job Creators Network, a conservative U.S. advocacy group
- Journal of Clinical Nursing, a monthly peer-reviewed medical journal covering all aspects of nursing
- Judicial Crisis Network, an American conservative advocacy organization based in the United States
- JCN, the station code for Clarkson railway station, Perth, Western Australia, Australia
