= John Fingleton =

John Fingleton may refer to:

- Jack Fingleton (John Fingleton, 1908–1981), Australian cricketer and journalist
- John Fingleton (economist), Irish economist and former head of the Office for Fair Trading
