= Alistair Davis =

Alistair Davis may refer to:

- Alistair Davis (sport shooter), South African sport shooter
- Alistair Davis (businessman), New Zealand business leader and sustainability advocate

== See also ==
- Alistair Phillips-Davies, British businessman
