= Christine Ingleton =

Emeritus professor of palliative care at University of Sheffield

Academic background
- Thesis: Evaluating palliative care services: an analysis of two hospices in one health district using a pluralistic case study approach (1997)

Academic work
- Institutions: University of Sheffield, University of Auckland

Christine Ingleton is a British academic, and is an emeritus professor at the University of Sheffield, specialising in palliative care. She is co-editor of three text books on palliative care and nursing.

== Academic career ==
Ingleton trained as a nurse and specialised in intensive care nursing. After moving into academia, she completed a Bachelor of Education with Honours, a Master of Arts and in 1997 a PhD at the University of Sheffield. Her PhD thesis was titled Evaluating palliative care services: an analysis of two hospices in one health district using a pluralistic case study approach. Ingleton then joined the faculty of the School of Nursing and Midwifery at University of Sheffield, where she was Head of Department from 2003 to 2006. She was appointed to the position of full professor in 2010. Her inaugural professorial lecture was on the evidence base for palliative care nursing.

Ingleton holds a visiting professorship at the University of Auckland in New Zealand, and has co-supervised graduate students there alongside collaborator Professor Merryn Gott.

Ingleton's research focuses on palliative care, death and dying. She has co-edited three medical textbooks on nursing and palliative care, one of which is in its second edition.

Ingleton is a Fellow of the European Academy of Nursing Science and a Fellow of the Royal Society of Arts. She has served on the editorial boards of the British Journal of Community Nursing and the British Medical Journal (Supportive and Palliative Care).

== Selected works ==
=== Books ===
- Ingleton, Christine; Larkin, Philip J., eds. (2015). Palliative care nursing at a glance. At a glance series. John Wiley & Sons. ISBN 9781118759219.
- Gott, Merryn; Ingleton, Christine, eds. (2011). Living with ageing and dying: palliative and end of life care for older people. Oxford University Press. ISBN 978-0-199-56993-9.
- Payne, Sheila; Seymour, Jane; Ingleton, Christine, eds. (2008). Palliative care nursing: principles and evidence for practice (2nd ed.). Open University Press. ISBN 9780335236466.
- Payne, Sheila; Seymour, Jane; Ingleton, Christine, eds. (2004). Palliative care nursing: principles and evidence for practice (1st ed.). Open University Press. ISBN 9780335212439.

=== Journal articles ===
- McKeown, Jane; Clarke, Amanda; Ingleton, Christine; Ryan, Tony; Repper, Julie (2010). "The use of life story work with people with dementia to enhance person-centred care". International Journal of Older People Nursing. 5 (2): 148–158. doi:10.1111/j.1748-3743.2010.00219.x. PMID 20925716. Wikidata Q53062347.
- Robinson, Jackie; Gott, Caryl Merryn; Ingleton, Christine (2013). "Patient and family experiences of palliative care in hospital: what do we know? An integrative review". Palliative Medicine. 28 (1): 18–33. doi:10.1177/0269216313487568. PMID 23670719. Wikidata Q38106653.
- Gott, Caryl Merryn; Seymour, Jane; Ingleton, Christine; Gardiner, Clare; Bellamy, Gary (2011). "'That's part of everybody's job': the perspectives of health care staff in England and New Zealand on the meaning and remit of palliative care". Palliative Medicine. 26 (3): 232–241. doi:10.1177/0269216311408993. PMID 21677020. Wikidata Q50194674.
- Gardiner, Clare; Cobb, Mark; Gott, Caryl Merryn; Ingleton, Christine (2011). "Barriers to providing palliative care for older people in acute hospitals". Age and Ageing. 40 (2): 233–238. doi:10.1093/ageing/afq172. PMID 21257618. Wikidata Q58036461.
- Gardiner, Clare; Gott, Caryl Merryn; Ingleton, Christine; Seymour, Jane; Cobb, Mark; Noble, Bill; Bennett, Michael; Ryan, Tony (2012). "Extent of palliative care need in the acute hospital setting: a survey of two acute hospitals in the UK". Palliative Medicine. 27 (1): 76–83. doi:10.1177/0269216312447592. PMID 22619261. Wikidata Q43534470.
