= Jan Thomas (academic) =

Australian-New Zealand veterinary scientist and university administrator

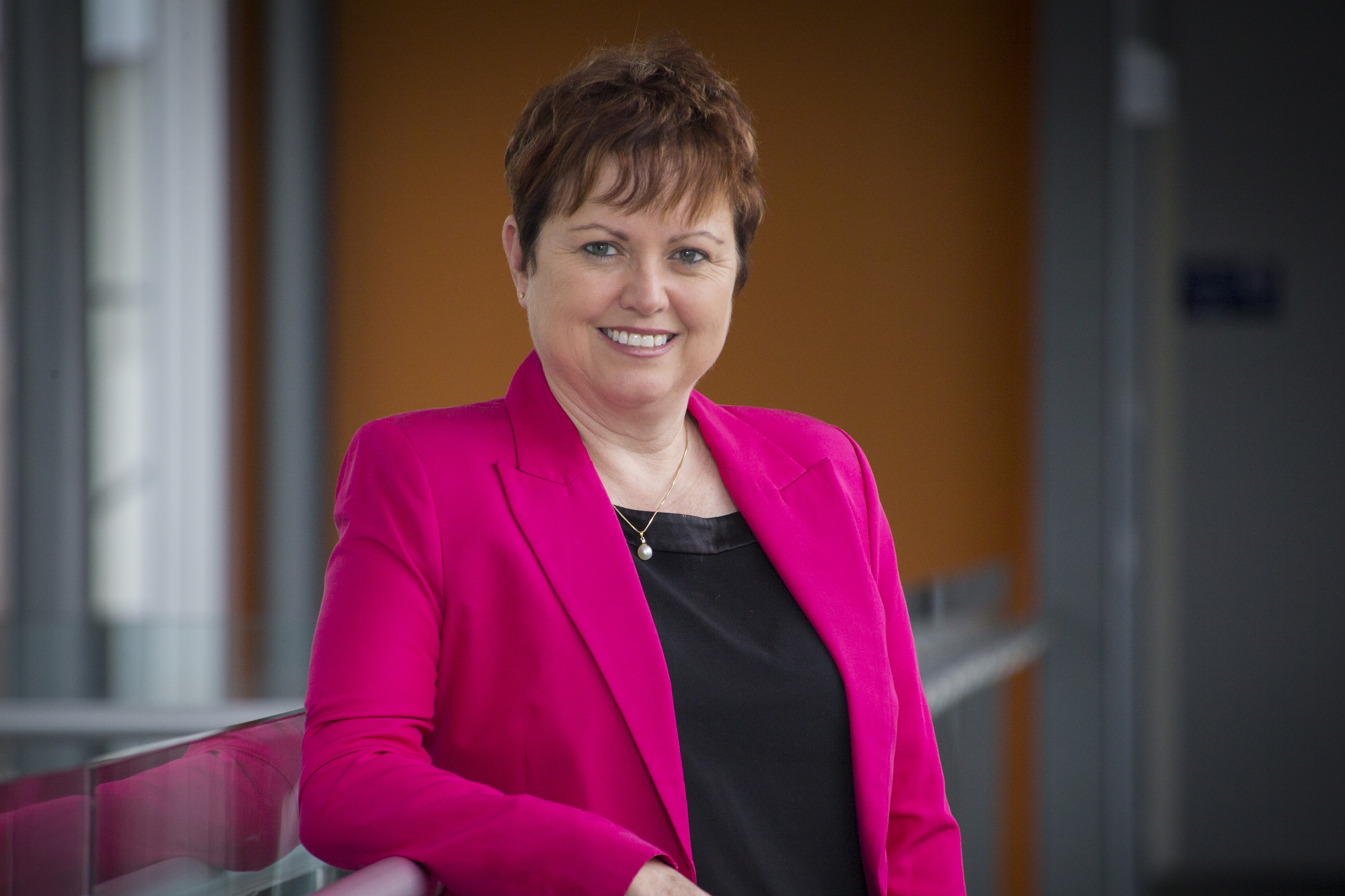
- Thomas in 2017

6th Vice-Chancellor of Massey University
- In office January 2017 – February 2026
- Chancellor: Michael Ahie
- Preceded by: Steve Maharey

Vice-Chancellor and President of the University of Southern Queensland
- In office January 2012 – December 2016
- Chancellor: John Dornbusch
- Preceded by: Bill Lovegrove
- Succeeded by: Geraldine Mackenzie

Personal details
- Born: 13 March 1962 (age 64) Sydney, Australia
- Occupation: Academic
- Website: http://www.massey.ac.nz/?vcaff4821y
- Scientific career
- Education: Murdoch University (BS, BVM, PhD); University of Melbourne (MVS)
- Fields: veterinary science
- Workplaces: Murdoch University; University of Notre Dame Australia; University of Southern Queensland; Massey University
- Thesis: Feline immunodeficiency virus infection in domestic cats in Western Australia: Prevalence of natural infection and association with clinical and morphological disease (1997)
- Doctoral advisors: Wayne Robinson; Clive Huxtable

Professor Jan Thomas is a veterinary scientist and career academic. Professor Thomas is sixth Vice-Chancellor of Massey University, New Zealand.

She has been a supporter of indigenous and minority groups throughout her career. Thomas has stated her ambition for Massey University to become a te Tiriti-led organisation and contribute to a socially progressive New Zealand.

In August 2023, Professor Thomas received her New Zealand citizenship at a ceremony at Massey University's Refectory Building, from Mayor Grant Smith.

Professor Thomas announced her resignation as Vice-Chancellor in April 2025, but said she would stay in the role for up to a year while her successor was appointed. Professor Pierre Venter was named as Massey University's next Vice-Chancellor and will take up the role in February 2026.

== Early career ==
Prior to her academic career, Professor Thomas worked as a veterinary surgeon, diagnostic veterinary pathologist and a private laboratory consultant. After graduating BVMZ in 1983 she spent a year working in a small-animal clinic in Perth, WA, then moved to Melbourne to do her master's degree, which she completed in 1986. Thomas returned to Murdoch University in 1987 to work in diagnostic veterinary pathology and was awarded membership of the Australian College of Veterinary Scientists. Professor Thomas decided to pursue a career in academia having seen the power universities have to transform lives.

== Academic career ==
Professor Thomas holds a Bachelor of Science in veterinary biology (1981), a Bachelor of Veterinary Medicine and Surgery (1983), both from Murdoch University in Perth, Australia; a Master of Veterinary Studies in pathology from the University of Melbourne (1986) and a Doctor of Philosophy from Murdoch University (1997). Professor Thomas has published 17 refereed articles in the last thirty years, including articles on feline immunodeficiency virus (FIV) infection and clinical pathology, topics that were part of her PhD. All these articles were co-authored.

She has held a number of leadership positions at universities throughout Australasia. Prior to her appointment at Massey University, she was Vice-Chancellor and President of the University of Southern Queensland in Toowoomba, Australia, a role she had held since 2012. She has also served as Deputy Vice-Chancellor Research and Quality and Deputy Vice-Chancellor Fremantle at the University of Notre Dame Australia in Western Australia (2010–11) and Deputy Vice-Chancellor Academic at Murdoch (2003–10).

In October 2016 it was announced she would be the sixth Vice-Chancellor of Massey University and commenced in the role in January 2017. Then-Chancellor Chris Kelly said Thomas was selected for her proven academic background and experience in senior management roles in university environments.

=== Massey expands into Singapore ===
In April 2024, Massey University signed an agreement with education provider PSB Academy in Singapore. This enhanced collaboration represents a significant expansion beyond traditional offshore teaching partnerships and is a first for New Zealand universities. Massey will offer Singaporean students and international students from around the region, access to top-quality New Zealand education programmes.

New Zealand Prime Minister Christopher Luxon attended the signing event and expressed his support during a business delegation trip to Southeast Asia, which included Professor Thomas.

=== Financial recovery ===
In March 2025, Massey announced it had achieved a $3.7m surplus for the year ending 31 December 2024. This as yet unaudited result was much better than the forecast deficit of -$8.9m.

Vice-Chancellor Jan Thomas told the Manawatū Standard there was still work to do, but the university was heading in a good direction towards fiscal sustainability.

The surplus was partly due to a significant decrease in spending in the last quarter of 2024, which was lower than previous years, and some one-off items, such as holding open vacancies.

Massey was budgeting for a $13m loss this year, a $9m deficit the following year, before breaking even in 2028-29. The university had no debt.

=== Calls for resignation ===
On 18 September 2018, it was revealed via documents released under the OIA New Zealand that Professor Thomas used her influence as the Vice-Chancellor to silence Dr Don Brash the day before he was due to give a speech to Politics Society at Massey University. A review by Massey University's council subsequently cleared her of wrongdoing, with Chancellor Michael Ahie stating that the Council supported and had full confidence in Professor Thomas. Massey University's Māori staff association Te Matawhānui publicly spoke out in support of Thomas, particularly due to her leadership of Massey as a te Tiriti-led university.

== Professional memberships ==
- Fellow of the Australian Institute of Company Directors
- Fellow of the Australian Institute of Management
- Member of the Australian and New Zealand College of Veterinary Scientists
- Chair of the Quality Assurance Council, Hong Kong
- Member of the Hong Kong University Grants Committee
- Former chair of the Council for the Association of Commonwealth Universities

== Honours, decorations, awards and distinctions ==
- Recipient of a Murdoch University Vice-Chancellor's Excellence in Teaching Award (1996)
- Recipient of the inaugural Australian Veterinary Association's Excellence in Teaching Award for outstanding teaching in Veterinary Science (1998)
- Recipient of the inaugural Catherine McAuley Award for Leadership to women aged 25 – 40 who have demonstrated outstanding leadership or potential to lead in their designated area (1999)
- Recipient of Murdoch University's Vice-Chancellor's Equity Award (1999)
- Women's Achievement Award, World Education Congress Mumbai (2012)
- Education Leadership Award, World Marketing Summit Kuala Lumpur (2013)
- Education Leadership Award, World Education Congress Mumbai (2014)
- Murdoch University Distinguished Alumni Award winner (2016)
- Finalist, Telstra Queensland Business Woman of Year award (2016)
