= PSB Academy =

Private school

- Type: Private
- Established: 1964; 62 years ago
- Accreditation: EduTrust Singapore
- Campus: PSB Academy City Campus; PSB Academy STEM Campus
- Website: www.psb-academy.edu.sg

PSB Academy is a private educational institution (PEI) that offers certificates, diplomas, bachelor's and master's degree programmes in Singapore. It is registered under SkillsFuture Singapore (SSG).

There are six schools in PSB Academy, the School of Foundation Studies, School of Business and Management, School of Engineering and Technology, School of Life and Physical Science, School of Postgraduate Studies, and the Digital Academy.

== History ==
PSB Academy was established in 1964 as a small Productivity Unit and later became the National Productivity Centre under the purview of the Economic Development Board. In 1972, the National Productivity Board (NPB) was established, which led to the launch of the National Productivity Council and the Productivity Movement. In 1986, NPB's mandate was enhanced to implement a total approach to productivity and in 1988, the Management Services Supervisory Development Division was formalised to become a full-fledged institution known as the Institute for Productivity Training (IPT).

In 1996, NPB and Singapore Institute of Standards and Industrial Research (SISIR) merged to form the Singapore Productivity and Standards Board (PSB) and the IPT changed its name to the PSB Institute of Productivity Training (PSB-IPT). As part of the government's restructuring efforts, PSB was corporatised in 2001, and IPT-PSB was renamed to PSB Academy, which was then privatised in 2006 and owned by testing and certification firm TUV SUD.

In 2006, Baring Private Equity Asia (BPEA) bought over PSB Academy from TUV SUD.

In 2017, PSB Academy opened a City Campus, which cost S$15 million, at Marina Square.

According to PSB, the investment will "bolster the Academy’s momentum of catering to the rising demands of Asia's under-served higher education need". Last year, the academy opened satellite campuses in Myanmar and Indonesia, after opening a S$15 million campus in Marina Square.

In January 2018, Intermediate Capital Group (ICG) bought PSB Academy from BPEA.

In November 2022, PSB Academy launched a STEM Wing in Marina Square, as part of the S$10 million expansion of its City Campus.

In April 2024, PSB Academy signed an agreement with the New Zealand public research university Massey University to establish an international branch campus in Singapore, based in the Main Wing. The programme launched in November 2024, offering undergraduate courses in information sciences and business, and a postgraduate course in analytics, which has since been scrapped and replaced by a postgraduate course in media studies.

In April 2025, PSB Academy inaugurated the new two-storey 43,000 square feet (4000 m^{2}) Cathay Campus, expanding into historical building The Cathay. The first floor on Level 5 exclusively houses programmes in collaboration with Coventry University, while Level 6 is open to all students. PSB Academy entered into a strategic educational partnership with the university in May 2014. The campus opening coincided with a tripartite agreement between PSB Academy, Coventry University, and COSEM, a cooperative of the Singapore Civil Defence Force (SCDF), leading to a launch of a paramedicine programme.

== Campus ==
PSB Academy currently has its campuses located at Marina Square and The Cathay. It originally had its campus located at Tiong Bahru.

== Graduate employment ==
A 2023 Graduate Employment Survey (GES) by PSB Academy shows a 84% employment rate within six months of exams, an increase from 78% the previous year.

== Accreditations ==
- 4-year EduTrust
- National Business Award in Education, Singapore Business Review (2017, 2018, 2021, 2023, 2024, 2025, 2026)
- Best Educational Institute - Singapore, APAC Insider (2019)
