= Mark Hayter (academic) =

British nurse educator and researcher

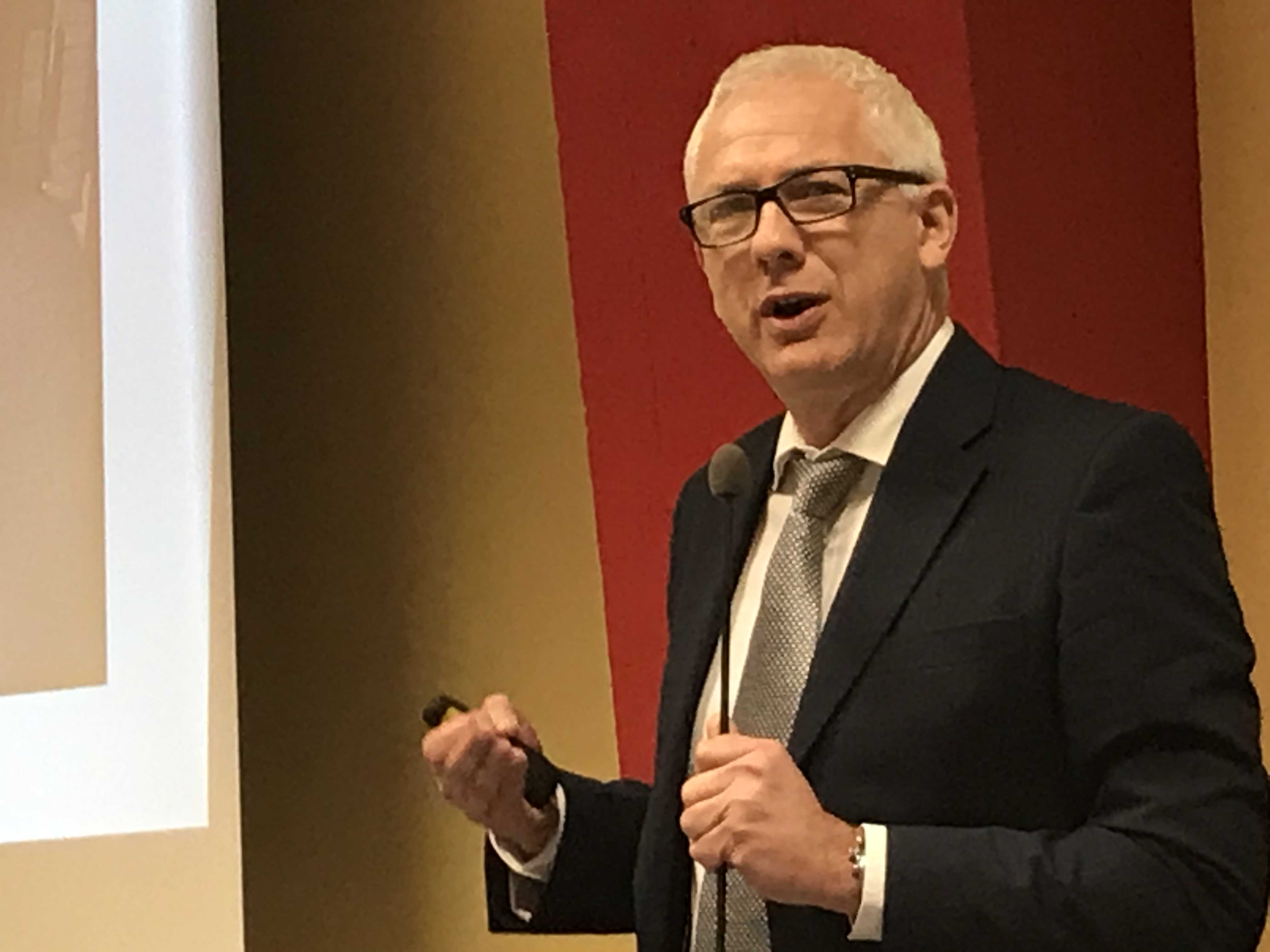
- Born: 7 November 1963 (age 62); Sheffield, England, UK
- Known for: Research on Nursing
- Spouse: Amanda Lee

Academic background
- Education: Sheffield Hallam University; University of Sheffield

Academic work
- Discipline: Nursing
- Institutions: Manchester Metropolitan University
- Website: www.mmu.ac.uk/staff/profile/professor-mark-hayter

Mark Hayter (born 7 November 1963) is a British academic. He is Emeritus Professor of Nursing at the Manchester Metropolitan University. He serves as editor-in-chief of the Journal of Clinical Nursing and on the editorial boards of Journal of School Nursing, and Nursing Outlook. Hayter is best known for his research on sexual health including psychosexual health, adolescent reproductive health, family planning, contraceptive counseling, and HIV. He was a founding member of The Lancet Commission on Nursing.

== Education ==
Hayter is a registered nurse, holds a BA in social dimensions of health from Sheffield Hallam University, and a MMed.Sci in clinical nursing and PhD from the University of Sheffield.

== Professional life ==
Hayter served as Head of the School of Nursing and Public Health at the Manchester Metropolitan University (2021-2024). Previously he was Head of Department, Nursing (2013 -2016) and Associate Dean of Research (2016-2020) and was most recently Professor of Nursing and Health Research, Faculty of Health Sciences, University of Hull. He is an international expert in qualitative research, and has offered highly-cited guidance on the subject. Hayter is a regular contributor to The Conversation, arguing that nurses should take the HIV self-test to role-model sexual health behaviors to their patients. He is also a regular contributor to The Guardian encouraging the National Health Service to support an increase in the number and the quality of the training of nurses.

== Awards and recognition ==
Hayter is a fellow of the Royal College of Nursing (2021), a fellow of the American Academy of Nursing (2013), a Fellow of the Royal Society of Arts, a fellow of the European Academy of Nursing Science, and a Fellow of the Royal College of Surgeons in Ireland Faculty of Nursing and Midwifery ad eundem (2020). He has served on numerous international scientific committees including the Royal College of Nursing research conference (2010 and 2012), the International School Nurse Conference (2011), and the World Association for Sexual Health Conference (2011). Hayter is included in the Stanford list of top 2% scientists in his field.

== Bibliography ==
Hayter has 160 publications listed on Web of Science that have been cited more than 2000 times, giving him an h-index of 27. His three most-cited articles are:

- Cleary, Michelle; Horsfall, Jan; Hayter, Mark (2014). "Data collection and sampling in qualitative research: does size matter?". Journal of Advanced Nursing. 70 (3): 473–475. doi:10.1111/jan.12163. PMID 24450874.
- Sutherland, Debbie; Hayter, Mark (2009). "Structured review: evaluating the effectiveness of nurse case managers in improving health outcomes in three major chronic diseases". Journal of Clinical Nursing. 18 (21): 2978–2992. doi:10.1111/j.1365-2702.2009.02900.x. PMID 19747197.
- Harris, David; Hayter, Mark; Allender, Steven (2008). "Improving the uptake of pulmonary rehabilitation in patients with COPD: qualitative study of experiences and attitudes". British Journal of General Practice. 58 (555): 703–710. doi:10.3399/bjgp08X342363. PMC 2553530. PMID 18826782.
