= Susan Kemp =

New Zealand social work academic

Susan Patricia Kemp
- Education: Columbia University
- Scientific career
- Fields: Social work
- Workplaces: University of Auckland
- Thesis: Social Work and Systems of Knowledge: the Concept of Environment in Social Casework Theory (1994)

Susan Patricia Kemp is a New Zealand social work academic.

== Academic career ==
Kemp completed a bachelor's degree in sociology and psychology at Massey University, a master's degree in sociology at the University of Auckland, and a second master's degree at Columbia University. She completed her Ph.D. at Columbia in 1994 with a dissertation titled Social Work and Systems of Knowledge: the Concept of Environment in Social Casework Theory. Later the same year she joined the teaching staff at the University of Washington, where she remained until her retirement in June 2020.

== Selected works ==
- Kemp, Susan Patricia, and Paula S. Nurius. "Preparing emerging doctoral scholars for transdisciplinary research: A developmental approach." Journal of teaching in social work 35, no. 1-2 (2015): 131-150.
- Kemp, Susan Patricia. "Social work and systems of knowledge: The concept of environment in social casework theory, 1900-1983." (1995): 1694-1694.
- Kemp, Susan P., Maureen O. Marcenko, Kimberly Hoagwood, and William Vesneski. "Engaging parents in child welfare services: Bridging family needs and child welfare mandates." Child welfare 88, no. 1 (2009): 101-126.
- Kemp, Susan P., James K. Whittaker, and Elizabeth M. Tracy. Person-environment practice: The social ecology of interpersonal helping. Transaction Publishers, 1997.
- Sutton, Sharon Egretta, and Susan P. Kemp. "Children as partners in neighborhood placemaking: lessons from intergenerational design charrettes." Journal of Environmental Psychology 22, no. 1-2 (2002): 171-189.
- Kemp, Susan P., and Jami M. Bodonyi. "Infants who stay in foster care: Child characteristics and permanency outcomes of legally free children first placed as infants." Child & Family Social Work (2000).
