= Monty Sutrisna =

British academic and researcher in construction

- Born: Indonesia
- Citizenship: British
- Education: University of Wolverhampton
- Scientific career
- Fields: Construction Project Management
- Workplaces: Massey University
- Thesis: Developing a Knowledge Based System for the Valuation of Variations on Civil Engineering Works (2004)

Monty Sutrisna is a British academic and researcher in construction and project management. He currently holds the position of Head of the School of Built Environment at Massey University in New Zealand. With an extensive career spanning academia and industry, Sutrisna has made contributions to the built environment field through his research, teaching, and leadership roles.

== Early life and education ==
Monty Sutrisna was born and raised in Indonesia. He completed his bachelor's degree in Civil Engineering, specializing in Construction Management, at Tarumanagara University, Indonesia, in 1997. Seeking further education, he moved to the United Kingdom, where he earned an MBA from the University of Salford in 2002. He continued his academic journey by pursuing a PhD in Construction Management, which he was awarded by the University of Wolverhampton in 2004.

== Academic roles ==
Monty Sutrisna's academic career began at the University of Salford, UK, where he held positions as a Lecturer, Senior Lecturer, and Director of Postgraduate Research Training and Outreach. In 2012, he joined Curtin University in Western Australia as an associate professor of Construction Management. During his tenure at Curtin University, he served as the Head of the Construction Management Department and Acting Head of the School of Built Environment. In April 2019, Sutrisna was appointed Head of the School of Built Environment at Massey University, New Zealand, where he continues to lead the school in strategic planning, research, and industry engagement. He is the former president of the Australasian Universities Building Education Association.

== Research and publications ==
Sutrisna is a prolific researcher with a broad range of publications, including refereed journal papers, book chapters, and conference proceedings. His research interests encompass cost estimation, project cost control, offsite construction, stakeholder engagement, and digital transformation in the construction industry. He has chaired and organized several international conferences and workshops, contributing to the advancement of knowledge in his field.

== Grants and funding ==
Throughout his career, Sutrisna has secured substantial research funding. He is the Lead Principal Investigator of CanConstructNZ, "Creating Capacity and Capability for the New Zealand Construction Sector," funded by the New Zealand Ministry of Business, Innovation & Employment.
