= Debra Jackson (nurse) =

Nurse academic and editor

Debra Jackson AO
- Born: Takapuna, New Zealand
- Citizenship: New Zealand; Australian
- Known for: Research on Nursing

Academic background
- Education: Southern Cross University; University of Sydney; Flinders University
- Doctoral advisor: Philip Darbyshire

Academic work
- Discipline: Nursing
- Institutions: University of Sydney
- Website: www.sydney.edu.au/medicine-health/about/our-people/academic-staff/debra.jackson.html?apcode=

Debra Elizabeth Jackson AO AO is an Australian academic nurse and professor of nursing at the Susan Wakil School of Nursing at the University of Sydney, Australia. In 2021 she was awarded professor emerita in the faculty of health in the University of Technology Sydney. She was previously the editor-in-chief of the Journal of Clinical Nursing and is now the editor-in-chief of the Journal of Advanced Nursing.

== Education ==
Jackson was educated at Avondale College New Zealand and began her nursing career at the Auckland Hospital Board School of Nursing. She has a Bachelor of Health Science in nursing from Southern Cross University (1992), a Master of Nursing from the University of Sydney (1995), and a Doctor of Philosophy from Flinders University (2000). Jackson has completed advanced leadership training at the University of Oxford (2017).

== Professional life ==
Jackson has worked internationally and her previous positions include: Director, Oxford Institute for Nursing, Midwifery & Allied Health Research (2015–2018); Principal Fellow, NIHR Oxford Biomedical Research Centre (2016–2019); Professor of Nursing, Oxford Brookes University (2015–2018); Key Researcher, Research for Indigenous Health and Social Equity (ISHE), Murdoch University (2016–2018); and Professor of Nursing, Western Sydney University (2001–2011). Jackson's work is in social justice and health care, and patient safety, particularly in the area of preventable harm to patients, including pressure injuries, particularly in relation to pressure injury in community settings, and addressing cultural disparity in skin assessment, highlighting that non-Caucasian people experience a higher burden of harm from pressure injury due to difficulties in identifying early damage. As such, Jackson’s work has raised awareness of the issue of inequity in relation to prevention and early recognition of pressure injury in persons from non-Caucasian backgrounds.

== Awards and honors ==
Jackson is a Fellow of the Australian College of Nursing (2014), Senior Fellow of the Higher Education Academy (2018) and Fellow of the Royal College of Surgeons in Ireland ad eundem(2020). She is a member of Sigma Theta Tau Honour Society of Nursing (2000). Jackson was named a Principal Fellowship of the NIHR Oxford Biomedical Research Centre (2015-2019). This was recorded in the New South Wales Parliament who recognised Jackson as a "highly regarded leader, academic, researcher, writer, mentor and member of the international nursing community". In 2019 Jackson was awarded the Officer of the Order of Australia for distinguished service to medical education in the field of nursing practice and research as an academic and author. In 2020, 2021, 2022, 2023 and 2024 Jackson was named as Australia’s leading nurse researcher by The Australian newspaper in their list of Australia’s Top 250 Researchers. In 2024 and again in 2025 she was also named Global Research Leader in her field. Jackson was awarded Alumnus of the Year (Health), Southern Cross University (2017), and Distinguished Alumni Award from Flinders University (2016). In 2020 Jackson was admitted to the Royal Society Te Apārangi, New Zealand.. In 2021 Jackson was awarded Alumnus of the Year, Southern Cross University (2020). In 2025 she was awarded honorary fellowship of the Royal College of Nursing

== Bibliography ==
Jackson has over 500 publications listed on Scopus that have been cited more than 7500 times, giving her an h-index of 42. Her three most-cited articles are:

- Jackson, D; Firtko, A; Edenborough, M (2007). "Personal resilience as a strategy for surviving and thriving in the face of workplace adversity: a literature review". Journal of Advanced Nursing. 60 (1): 34–40. doi:10.1111/j.1365-2648.2007.04412.x. PMID 19239514.
- Jackson, DW; Clare, J; Mannix, J (2002). "Who would want to be a nurse? Violence in the workplace - A factor in recruitment and retention". Journal of Nursing Management. 10 (1): 13–20. doi:10.1046/j.0966-0429.2001.00262.x. PMID 11906596.
- Elmir, R; Schmied, V; Wilkes, L; Jackson, D (2010). "Women's perceptions and experiences of a traumatic birth: A meta-ethnography". Journal of Advanced Nursing. 66 (10): 2142–2153. doi:10.1111/j.1365-2648.2010.05391.x. PMID 20636467.
