= Massey University =

University in New Zealand

- Te Kunenga ki Pūrehuroa (Māori)
- Coat of arms
- Former names: Antecedent institutions: Massey Agricultural College (1927–1962); Massey University College of Manawatu (1963)
- Motto: Floreat scientia (Latin)
- Motto in English: Let knowledge flourish
- Type: Public research university
- Established: 17 January 1927; 99 years ago
- Accreditation: NZQA
- Budget: NZ$564 million (2022)
- Chancellor: Alistair Davis
- Vice-Chancellor: Prof Dr Pierre Venter
- Academic staff: 1,106 (2024)
- Administrative staff: 1,549 (2024)
- Total staff: 2,655 (2024)
- Students: 26,099 (2024)
- Location: Palmerston North, Auckland and Wellington, New Zealand; 40.3848°S 175.6166°E
- Campus: Urban and regional
Colours
Massey triple colours
- Sporting affiliations: National Tertiary Championships
- Mascot: Fergus the Ram
- Website: massey.ac.nz

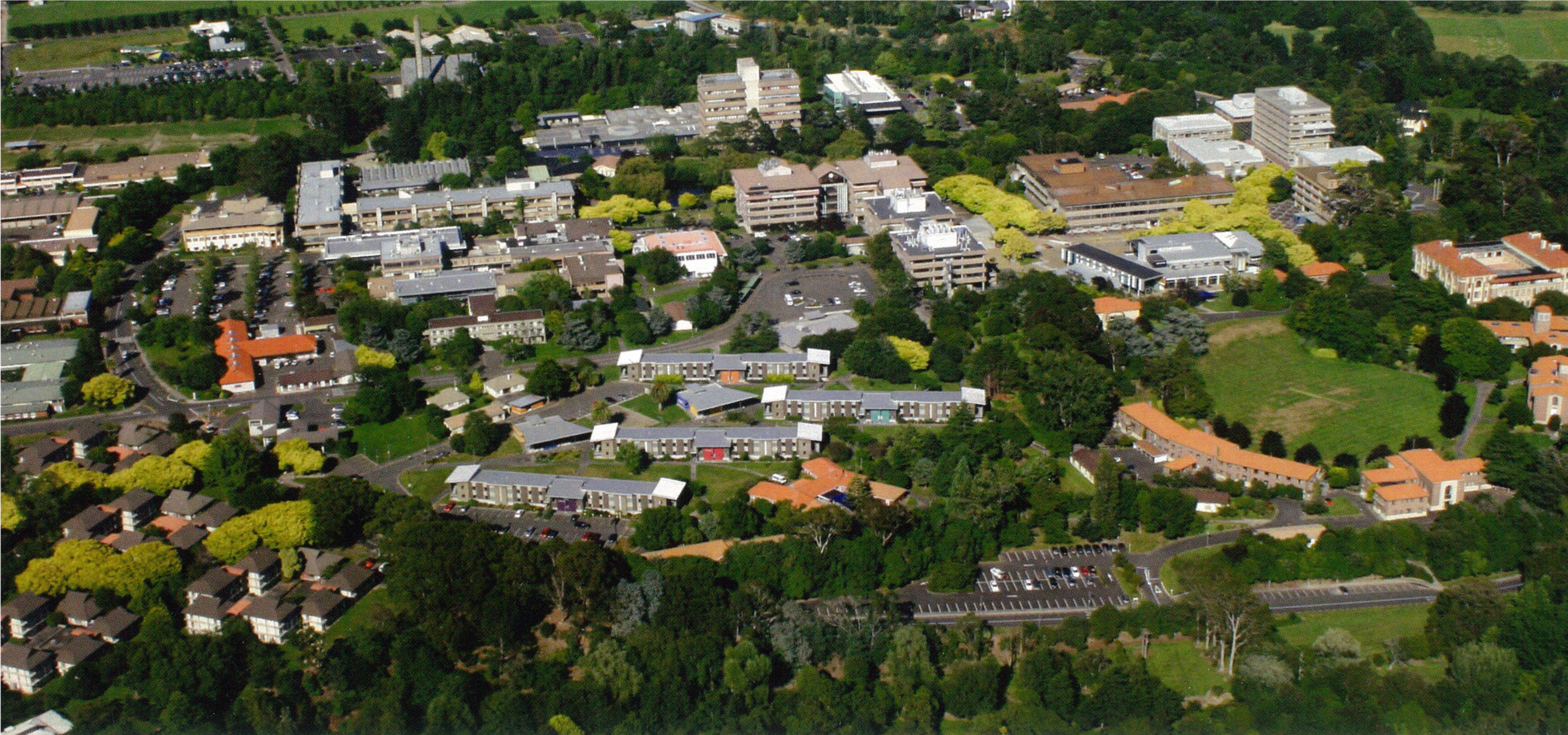
The Manawatū campus of Massey University, pictured in 2010. This was the university's original campus before expanding to Auckland and Wellington.

Massey University (Māori: Te Kunenga ki Pūrehuroa) is a public research university in New Zealand that provides internal and distance education. The university has campuses in Auckland, Palmerston North, and Wellington, as well as a branch campus in Singapore which was opened in 2024.

Massey is home to New Zealand's only veterinary school which is ranked 19th in the world and first in Australasia and Asia. It also specialises in animal science and agriculture, aviation, and creative arts.

Massey has been delivering distance learning for over 60 years.

Data from Universities New Zealand shows that in 2024 the university had approximately 26,505 students enrolled, making it the country's second-largest university. Research is undertaken on all three campuses and people from over 130 countries study at the university.

According to the university's annual report, in 2024, around 16.2% of equivalent full-time students were based at the Auckland campus, 17.7% at the Manawatū (Palmerston North) campus, and 13.3% at the Wellington campus. Distance learning accounted for 47.7% of the student body, while the remaining 5.1% studied at other locations.

Vice-Chancellor Jan Thomas announced her resignation in April 2025. In October 2025, Professor Pierre Venter was named as the next Vice-Chancellor, with his term beginning in February 2026.

== History ==
=== Origins (1879–1926) ===
The idea of establishing an agricultural college in New Zealand's North Island gained momentum as early as 1879, championed by figures like Sir George Grey, and late by Inspector-General George Hogben. In 1912, newly elected Prime Minister William Ferguson Massey made the project his priority, leading to the formation of agriculture chairs at Victoria University College (Wellington, 1923) and Auckland University College (1924). In 1926, both institutions transferred their agricultural schools under the New Zealand Agricultural College Act to form the New Zealand Agricultural College. Shortly thereafter, the decision was made to establish the college at the Batchelar property near Palmerston North.

=== Massey Agricultural College (1927–1962) ===
Although the Massey Agricultural College Act established the college in law, it did not become operational until the Governor-General formally constituted its council on 17 January 1927, marking the legal and operational commencement of the institution. The first meeting of the College Council was held in Wellington on 1 February 1927. In September 1927, the Massey Agricultural College Act was passed, renaming the institution Massey Agricultural College in honour of former New Zealand Prime Minister William Fergusson Massey, who had died in 1925. The name recognised the support of Massey's government for agricultural education and the establishment of an agricultural college in the North Island. The college opened on its doors to students on 2 March 1928, under the leadership of Principal Geoffrey Peren and Vice-Principal William Riddet. Initial enrolment numbered eight students on the first day, increasing to 85 by the end of the first year and 175 by the end of the second.

On 20 March 1928 the college was officially opened by Minister of Agriculture Oswald Hawken. The college emphasised practical farming alongside scientific study, pioneering research in dairy, irrigation, and animal breeding on its own farmlands. Despite hardship during the Great Depression and World War II, it expanded student accommodation, established the students' association (featuring the ram's head symbol in 1930), and welcomed its first female diploma student, Enid Hills, in 1932, and in 1938 its first female undergraduate degree student, Paddy Thorpe.

Post-war growth set the stage for university status. In 1961, after the dissolution of the University of New Zealand, the agricultural college became Massey College and allied temporarily with Victoria University of Wellington (VUW) until full autonomy could be gained.

=== University status and expansion (1963–1992) ===
The establishment in 1960 of the Palmerston North University College (PNUC), a branch of Victoria University of Wellington (VUW), provided university-level education in the humanities and social sciences in Palmerston North, and also introduced distance education. On 1 January 1963, PNUC and Massey College merged to become Massey University College of Manawatu. The Massey University Act of 1963 officially established Massey University of Manawatu on 1 January 1964, granting it full autonomy and university status, including the power to confer degrees. The current name, Massey University, was adopted in 1966.

Under founding Vice-Chancellor Sir Alan Stewart (1964–82), the university grew rapidly. In its first year it enrolled approximately 1,877 students (about equal internal and extramural), and by 1992 the total roll had grown to nearly 24,700 across nine faculties. Key early faculties included agriculture, veterinary science (unique among NZ universities), technology, science, humanities, social sciences, business, education, and maths/information science.

=== Multi campus growth (1993–present) ===
The 1990s saw Massey University expanding and become a tri-city university and expand its academic programmes:

- Auckland campus opened at Albany on Auckland's North Shore in 1993, under Vice-Chancellor Sir Neil Waters. Classes at this campus began that same year.
- The merger with Palmerston North College of Education occurred in 1996, under Vice-Chancellor Prof James McWha.
- Wellington Polytechnic merged with Massey University in 1999, which lead to the formation of the College of Creative Arts in Wellington.

In the late 1990s, the university's nine faculties were rationalised into five colleges: Business, Creative Arts, Education, Humanities and Social Sciences, and Sciences. In 2013, the College of Education was merged into the College of Humanities and Social Sciences, and a new College of Health was established. The goals of the establishment of the College of Health are to promote health and wellbeing, disease and injury prevention and protect people and communities from environmental risks to health.

In April 2024, Massey University signed an agreement with the private Singaporean education provider PSB Academy to provide various media, design and management courses as part of plans to establish a campus in Singapore. Chancellor Jan Thomas said this was part of Massey University's plans to diversify its income and enrol 5,000 offshore students by 2026. The campus opened its first intake in November 2024.

== Colleges and schools ==
Massey University organises its teaching and research through five discipline-based colleges, while a stand-alone School of Aviation reports directly to the senior leadership team.

The College of Creative Arts (Toi Rauwhārangi) is centred on the Wellington campus and brings together the National Academy of Screen Arts, Whiti o Rehua School of Art, Te Rewa o Puanga School of Music and Screen Arts, and Ngā Pae Māhutonga Wellington School of Design.

The College of Health (Te Kura Hauora Tangata) unites the School of Health Sciences, the School of Nursing, the School of Social Work, and the School of Sport, Exercise and Nutrition, reflecting the university's broad focus on population and individual wellbeing.

The College of Humanities and Social Sciences (Te Kura Pūkenga Tangata) hosts the Institute of Education (Te Kura o Te Mātauranga), the School of Humanities, Media and Creative Communication, the School of People, Environment and Planning, the School of Psychology (Te Kura Hinengaro Tangata), and Te Pūtahi-a-Toi – School of Māori Knowledge, making it Massey's largest and most diverse college.

The science and technology disciplines are grouped in the College of Sciences (Te Wāhanga Pūtaiao), which includes the School of Agriculture and Environment, the School of Built Environment, the School of Food Technology and Natural Sciences, the School of Mathematical and Computational Sciences, and School of Veterinary Science.

Business, economics and executive education are provided by the Massey Business School (Te Kura Whai Pakihi). It comprises the School of Accountancy, Economics and Finance (Te Kura Huinga Tahua), the School of Management and Marketing, and the Professional and Executive Development unit.

Outside the college structure, the School of Aviation (Te Kura Rererangi) delivers New Zealand's only university-based professional pilot training and aviation management programmes.

== Campuses ==
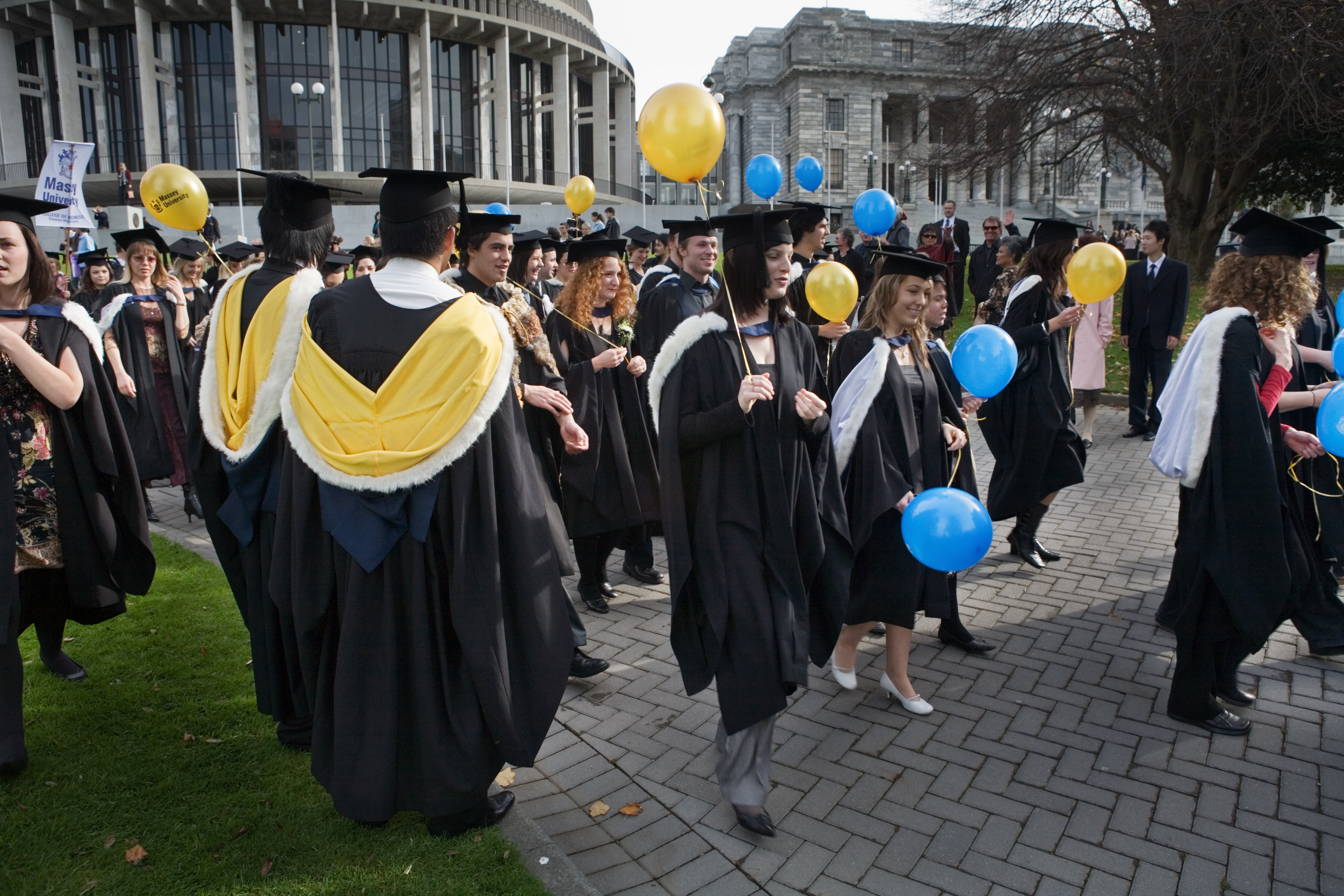
Graduates in Wellington

Massey University has campuses in Palmerston North in the Manawatū, in Wellington (in the suburb of Mt Cook) and on Auckland's North Shore in Albany. In addition, Massey offers most of its degrees extramurally within New Zealand and internationally. Research is undertaken on all three campuses. In November 2024, Massey University began offering several programs at the Singaporean PSB Academy as part of plans to establish an international branch campus in Singapore.

=== Auckland campus (Albany) ===
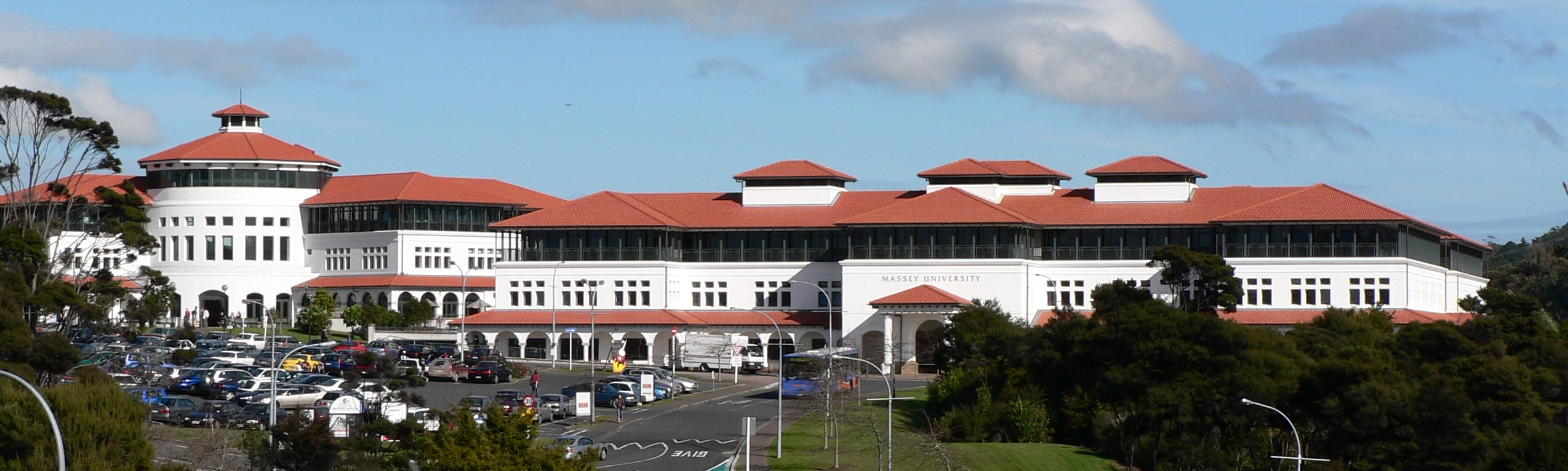
Part of Massey University's Albany Campus in 2005

Since 1993 the Albany campus in Auckland has grown rapidly in a fast developing part of Auckland's North Shore City. Science and Business are the two largest colleges on the campus, with the College of Science housing the New Zealand Institute for Advanced Study solely on the campus. Around 4,809 students are enrolled at Albany. This campus has grown since then and an on-campus accommodation facility opened in semester one 2015. On the Albany campus, a large golden chicken wing sculpture commemorates the site's history as a chicken farm.

On 1 July 2025 the New Zealand Police opened a branch of the Royal New Zealand Police College on the Auckland campus. This facility is being used for recruit training as well as senior courses.

=== Manawatū campus (Palmerston North) ===
Manawatū campus' concourse and student centre building during summer break.

Massey University was first established at the Turitea campus in Palmerston North, and hosts around 3000 students annually.

The Turitea site houses the main administrative units of Massey University as well as the College of Humanities and Social Sciences, the College of Sciences, the College of Health and Massey Business School. It is also home to the only Veterinary School in New Zealand. Massey University acquired a smaller second campus in Palmerston North in Hokowhitu when it merged with the Palmerston North College of Education in 1996, which was combined with the existing Faculty of Education to form Massey University's College of Education. In 2013 the Institute of Education was formed as part of the College of Humanities and Social Sciences. The Hokowhitu Campus was later sold in 2016 after the institute was relocated to the Turitea campus.

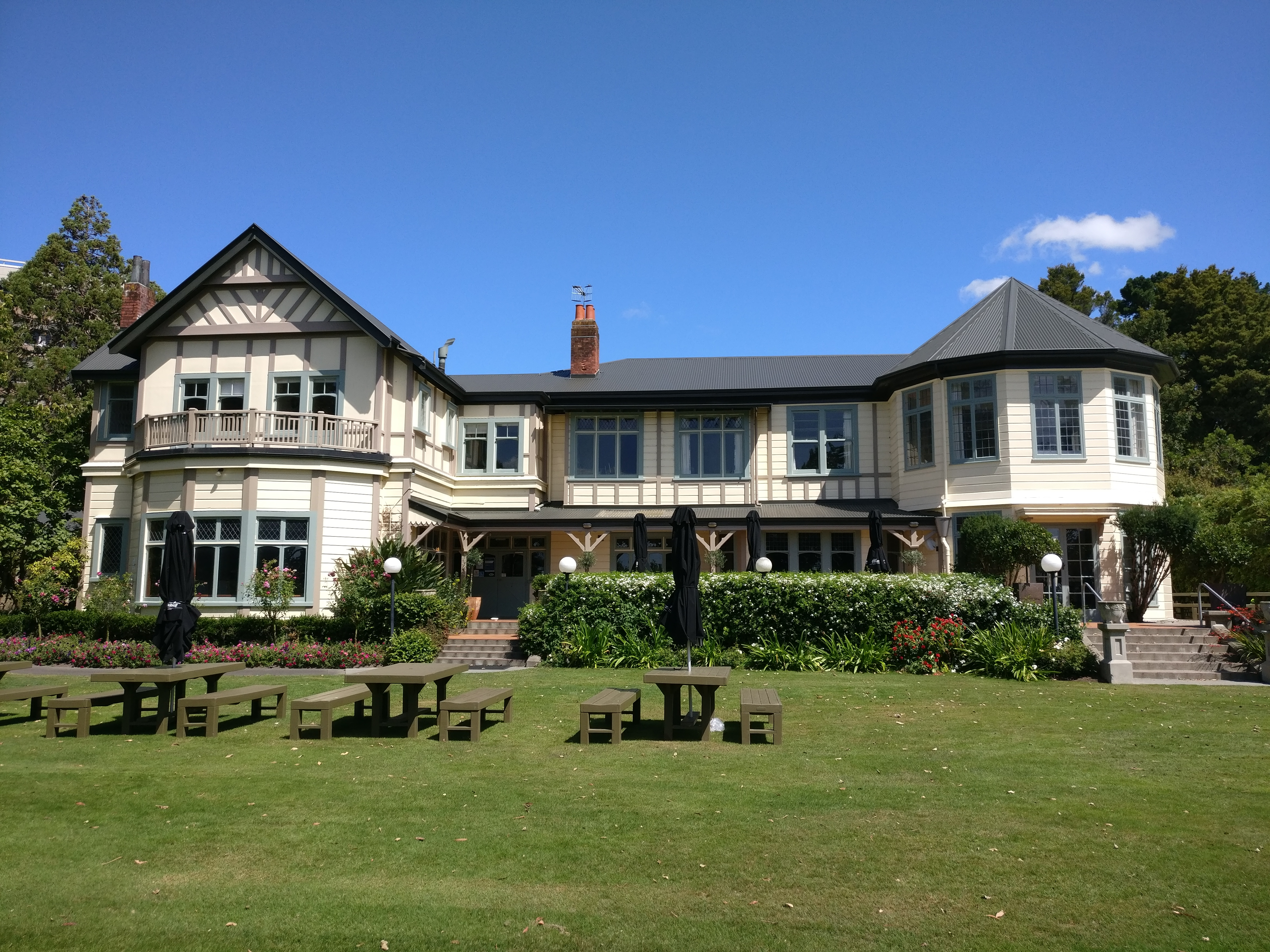
Wharerata, Palmerston North

Wharerata is a historic colonial home built in 1901 and surrounded by formal gardens and mature trees. It housed the staff social club until the late 1990s, and is now used as a cafe, function centre and wedding venue.

In 2019, Heritage New Zealand listed student hostel, Colombo Hall as a category 2 historic place. It was built in 1964.

In February 2023 the university announced that it would be building two solar farms on the Palmerston North campus, with a peak output of 7.87MW.

=== Wellington campus (Pukeahu) ===
The Pukeahu campus in Wellington campus was created through the merger with Wellington Polytechnic that was approved by the New Zealand Government and took place in 1999. The history of Wellington Polytechnic goes back to 1886 when the Wellington School of Design was established, it had a name change in 1891 to Wellington Technical School and in 1963 it was divided into Wellington Polytechnic and Wellington High School.

The Pukeahu campus primarily specialises in Design (College of Creative Arts), Nursing and Communication and Journalism. It has over 2,500 students.

=== Extramural ===
Extramural study first began in 1960 and Massey University is New Zealand's largest and pre-eminent provider of distance education.

In the mid-2010s, the university embarked on a major project to further digitise its distance delivery and in 2015 adopted Moodle (branded as Stream) as its new Learning Management System (LMS).

=== Libraries ===
The Massey University Library was first established at Massey Agricultural College in 1930 when the first librarian, Erica Baillie, was appointed at the college. The library of the Palmerston North University College became part of the Massey College Library after the merger of the two institutions in 1963. With the expansion of the university to other locations, site libraries were established. These include the Auckland campus library in 1993, the Hokowhitu site library in 1996 (since closed) with the merger with Palmerston North College of Education, and Wellington campus library in 1999 with the merger with Wellington Polytechnic. For a time in the 2000s, a site library was also operated at Ruawharo in Napier.

Like the university, the library has grown exponentially since the 1960s. It caters for both on-campus and distance students. Māori materials are well represented in the library collections. Among the collections with Māori material are the Ngā Kupu Ora collection, Māori Land Court Minute Books and the Bagnall collection. Heritage collections administered by the library include the Library Special Collections and the Massey University Archives.

=== Singapore campus ===
In April 2024, Chancellor Jan Thomas and Prime Minister Christopher Luxon confirmed that Massey University would partner with Singapore's PSB Academy as part of plans to establish an international branch campus. The Singapore campus opened in November 2024, offering a bachelor in information science, a bachelor of business of analytics.

== Graduation ceremony venues ==
- Te Rau Karamu Marae in Wellington,
- Michael Fowler Centre in Wellington,
- Regent on Broadway in Palmerston North,
- Bruce Mason Centre in Auckland

== Governance ==
The governing body of Massey Agricultural College, and Massey College, was the Council (known as the Board of Governors, between 1938 and 1952). Massey University is governed by the University Council. The council oversees the management and control of the university's affairs, concerns and property.

The following table lists those who have held the position of Chair of the Board of Governors of the college and later Chancellor of the university, being the ceremonial head of the institution.

	Name	Portrait	Term
Chair of the Board of Governors
1	George Fowlds		1927–1934
2	William Perry		1934–1935
3	Thomas Hunter		1936–1938
4	Arthur Morton		1938–1942
5	Grey Campbell		1943
6	Alan Candy		1944–1946
7	Gus Mansford		1947
8	Walter Dyer		1947–1959
9	Ned Holt		1960–1962
Chancellor
1	Jack Andrews		1963–1966
2	Blair Tennent		1967–1970
3	Les Gandar		1970–1975
4	Arthur Ward		1976–1980
5	Lindsay Wallace		1981–1984
6	Doug Easton		1985–1990
7	Hugh Williams		1991–1997
8	Morva Croxson		1998–2002
9	Nigel Gould		2003–2008
10	Russ Ballard		2009–2013
11	Chris Kelly		2013–2016
12	Michael Ahie		2016–2024
13	Alistair Davis		2024–present

The following table lists those who have held the position of principal of the college and later vice-chancellor of the university, being the chief executive officer of the institution.

	Name	Portrait	Term
Principal
1	Geoffrey Peren		1927–1958
1	Alan Stewart		1959–1963
Vice-chancellor
1	Alan Stewart		1964–1983
2	Neil Waters		1983–1995
3	James McWha		1995–2002
4	Judith Kinnear		2003–2008
5	Steve Maharey		2008–2016
6	Jan Thomas		2017–2026
7	Pierre Venter		2026-present

=== Coat of arms ===
Coat of arms of Massey University
Adopted 1967 Crest On a wreath of the colours issuant from flames proper a ram's head argent horned and ensigned by the horns of the African long legged ram. Escutcheon Gyronny of ten argent and azure a mullet gules ambriated argent and irradiated or. Motto Floreat scientia (Latin: 'Let knowledge flourish')

== Academic profile ==
=== Key facts ===
From 2024 Annual Report:

- 2,655 staff
- 26,099 students (15,947 EFTS)
- 3,163 Māori students
- 1,593 Pacific students
- 262 women in leadership positions (49%)
- 2 National Centres of Research Excellence (and numerous university-based Research Centres)

=== Academic reputation ===
University rankings

Global – Overall
- ARWU World: 801-900 (2025)
- CWTS World: 677 (Note: The CWTS Leiden Ranking is based on P (top 10%).) (2024)
- QS World: =230 (2026)
- QS Employability: 251–300 (2022)
- THE World: 501–600 (2026)
- USNWR Global: =660 (25/26)

National – Overall
- ARWU National: 6 (2025)
- CWTS National: 3 (2024)
- QS National: 3 (2026)
- THE National: 5–7 (2026)
- USNWR National: 6 (25/26)

In the 2026 Quacquarelli Symonds World University Rankings (published 2025), the university attained a tied position of #230 (3rd nationally).

In the Times Higher Education World University Rankings 2026 (published 2025), the university attained a position of #501–600 (tied 5–7th nationally).

In the 2025 Academic Ranking of World Universities, the university attained a position of #801-900 (tied 6th nationally).

In the 2025–2026 U.S. News & World Report Best Global Universities, the university attained a tied position of #660 (6th nationally).

In the CWTS Leiden Ranking 2024, the university attained a position of #677 (3rd nationally).

== Student life ==
=== Te Tira Ahu Pae ===
Te Tire Ahu Pae (TTAP) is the single students' association at Massey University's four campuses in Pāmamao – Distance, Ōtehā – Auckland, Manawatū – Palmerston North and Pukeahu – Wellington. In the new structure, there are a total of 31 student reps on the Te Tira Ahu Pae Student Executive.

Te Tire Ahu Pae provides both representation and student services to Massey University students.

The services TTAP delivers include:

- Student Representation
- Advocacy
- Clubs and societies
- Events
- Media – Radio Control 99.4FM and Massive Magazine

== Notable people ==
=== Faculty and staff ===
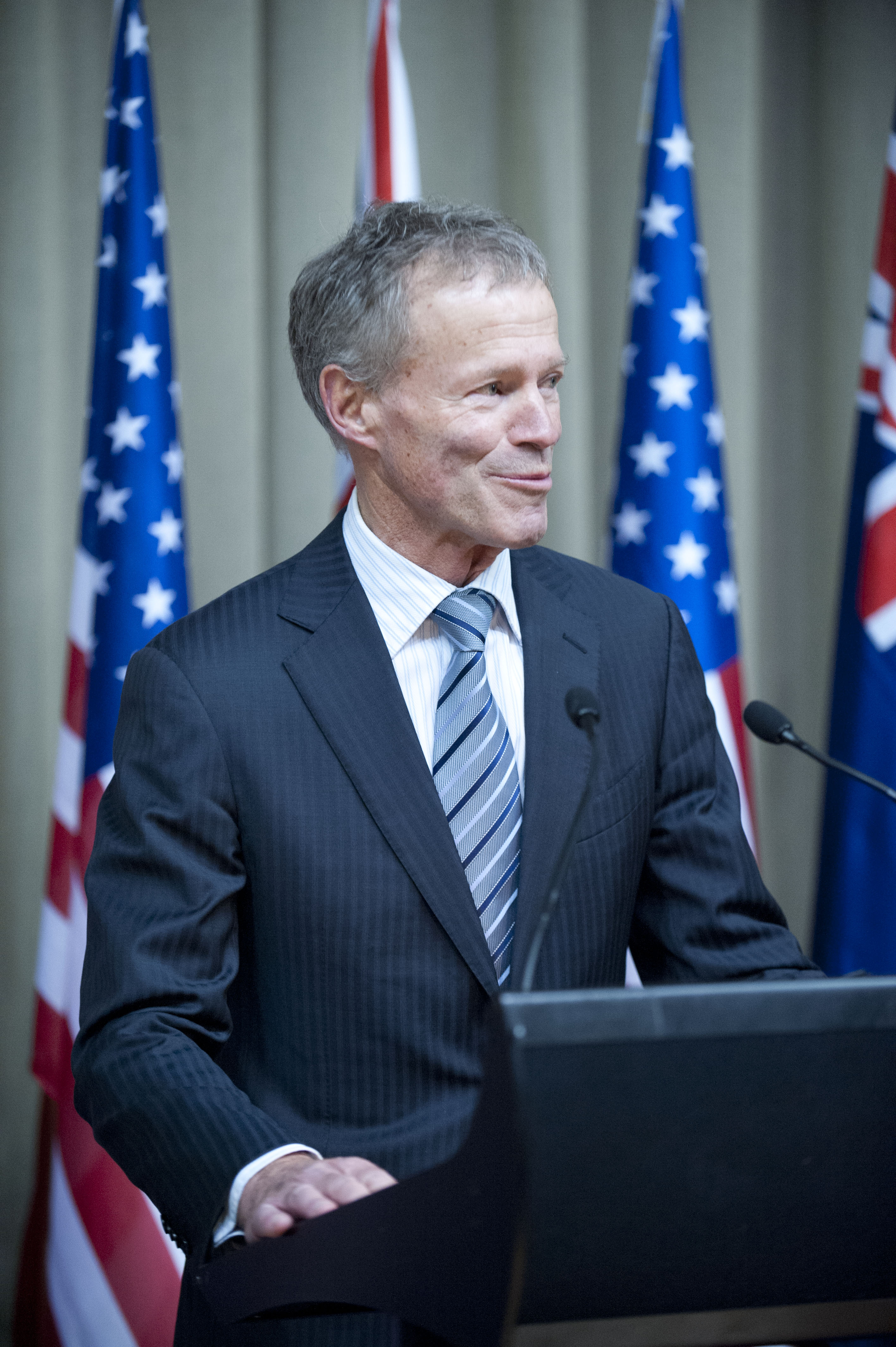
Lockwood Smith

Notable faculty, past or present, include:

- Fiona Alpass
- Marti Anderson (statistician)
- Kingsley Baird
- Helen Moewaka Barnes
- Rosemary E. Bradshaw
- Dianne Brunton
- Barbara Burlingame
- Paul Callaghan
- Marta Camps
- Brian Carpenter
- Kerry Chamberlain
- Ashraf Choudhary
- Shane Cotton
- Anne de Bruin
- John Dunmore
- Mohan Dutta
- Mary Earle
- Craig Harrison
- Joel Hayward
- Darrin Hodgetts
- Karen Hoare
- Jill Hooks
- Ingrid Horrocks
- Joanne Hort
- Mike Joy
- Vicki Karaminas
- Hugh Kawharu
- Sarah Leberman
- Ruggiero Lovreglio
- Steve Maharey
- Gaven Martin
- Stuart McCutcheon
- Robert McLachlan
- Jane Mills
- Caroline Miller
- Mary Morgan-Richards
- Anne Noble
- David Officer
- W. H. Oliver
- Nitha Palakshappa
- Farah Palmer
- David Parry
- Diane Pearson
- David Penny
- Geoffrey Peren
- Peter Schwerdtfeger
- Nicolette Sheridan
- Lockwood Smith
- David Stenhouse
- Christine Stephens
- Monty Sutrisna
- Marilyn Waring
- John Stuart Yeates
- Andrea 't Mannetje
- Mandy Morgan

=== Notable alumni ===
==== Politicians ====
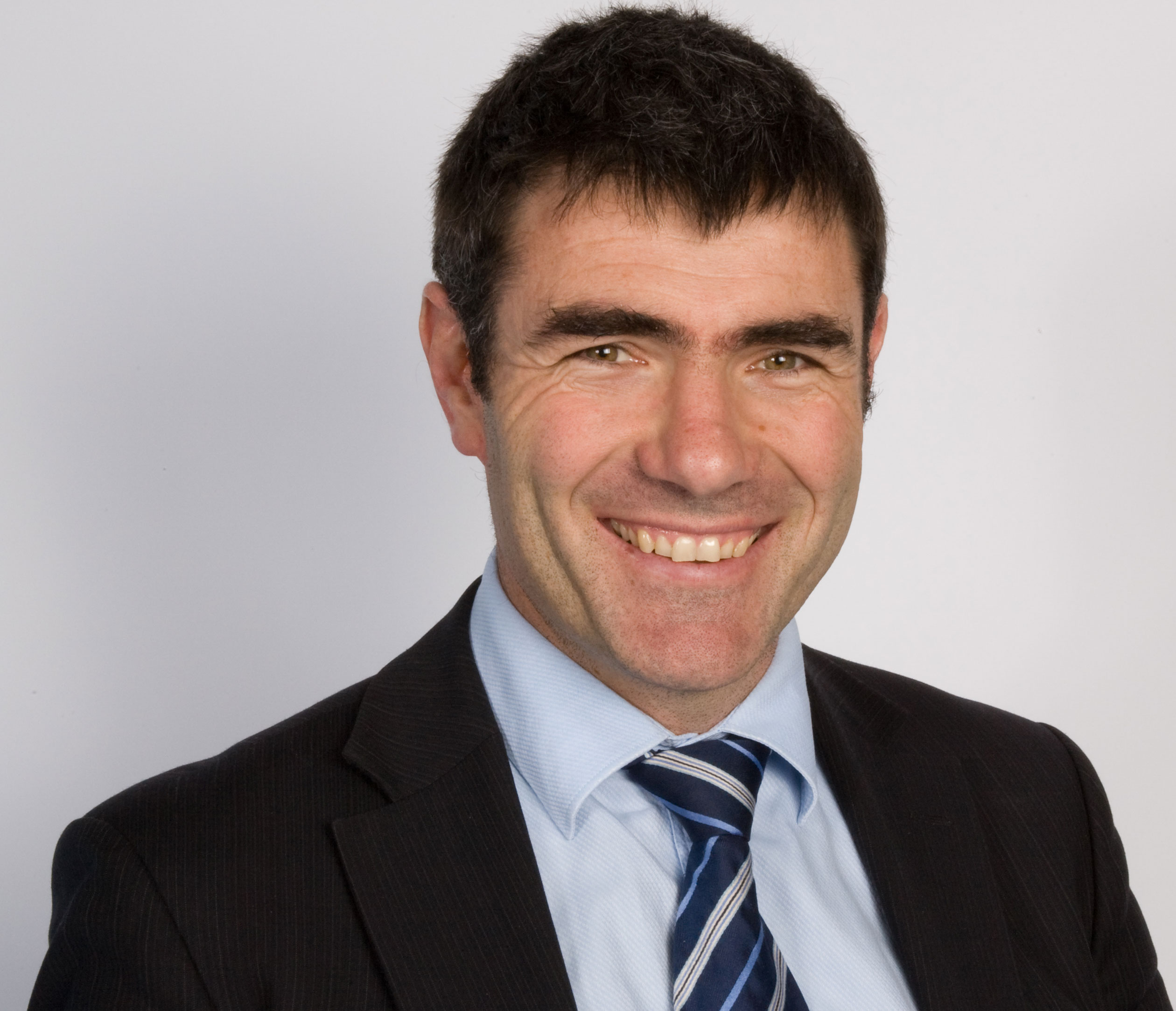
Nathan Guy

- Paula Bennett (BA, social policy)
- Ashraf Choudhary (PhD, agronomy)
- Brian Connell (history and geography)
- Wyatt Creech (agriculture)
- Peter Dunne (business administration)
- Nathan Guy (agriculture)
- Pete Hodgson (BVSc, veterinary science)
- Steven Joyce (BSc, zoology)
- John Luxton (BAgSci and Dip. Ag Science)
- Steve Maharey (MA, sociology)
- Tony Ryall (BBS and Dip. Business Studies)
- Nicky Wagner (MBA)
- Ian Shearer (MAgSci)
- Sir Lockwood Smith (BAgSci and MAgSci)

==== Sportspeople ====
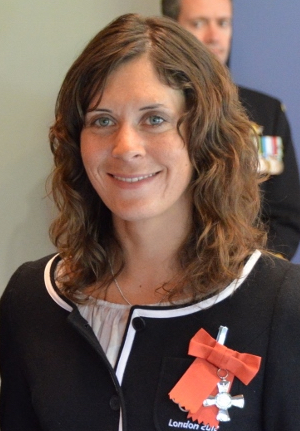
Jo Aleh

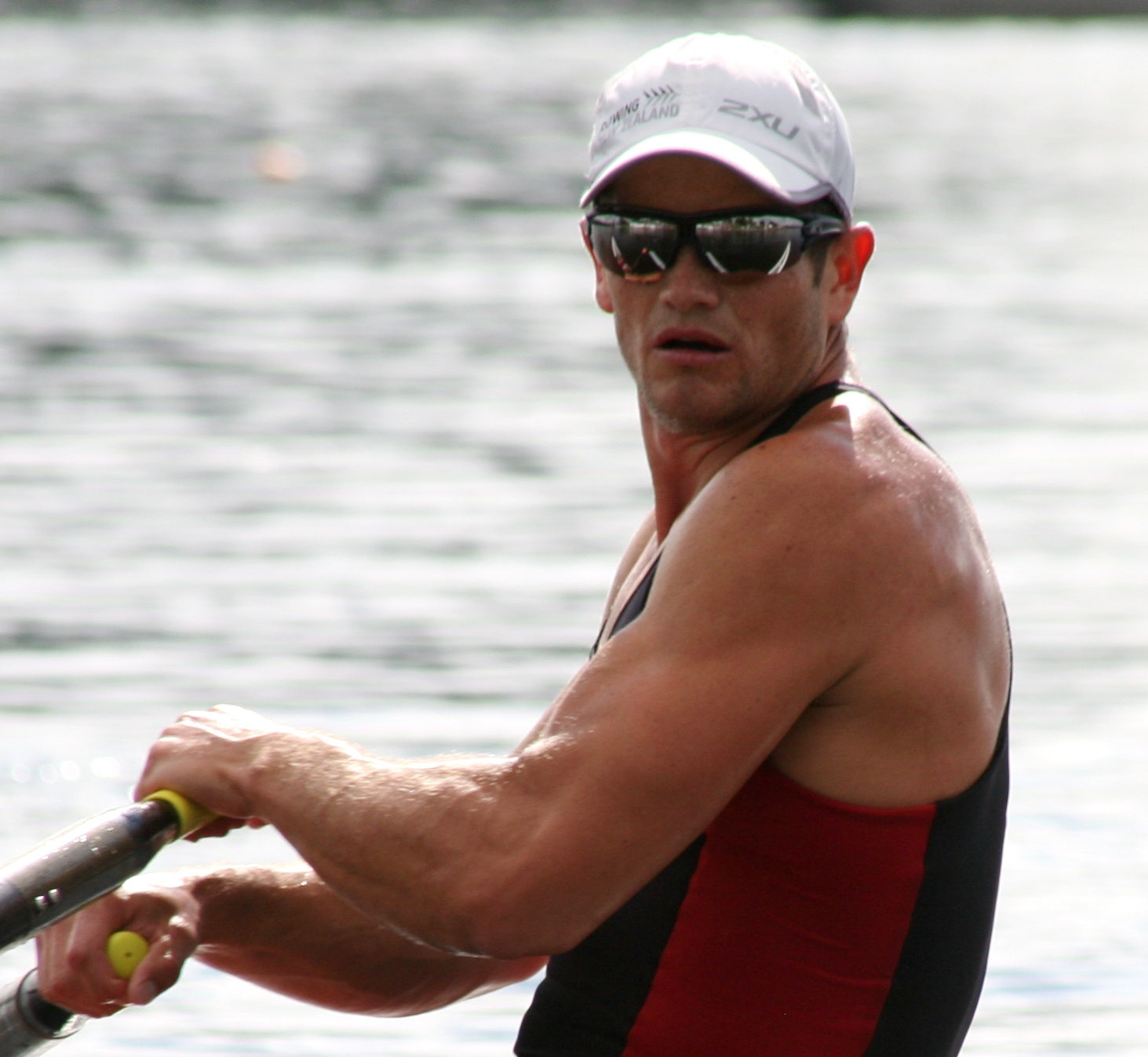
Nathan Cohen

- Jo Aleh (born 1986) – world champion and Olympic champion sailor
- Nathan Cohen (born 1986) – world champion and Olympic champion rower
- Rico Gear – rugby union
- Scott Talbot – swimmer and swimming coach
- Farah Palmer (Black Ferns)
- Graham Henry (All Blacks)
- Paul Hitchcock (Black Caps)
- Nehe Milner-Skudder (All Blacks)
- Gemma Flynn (Black Sticks)
- Sally Johnston – sport shooter

==== Others ====
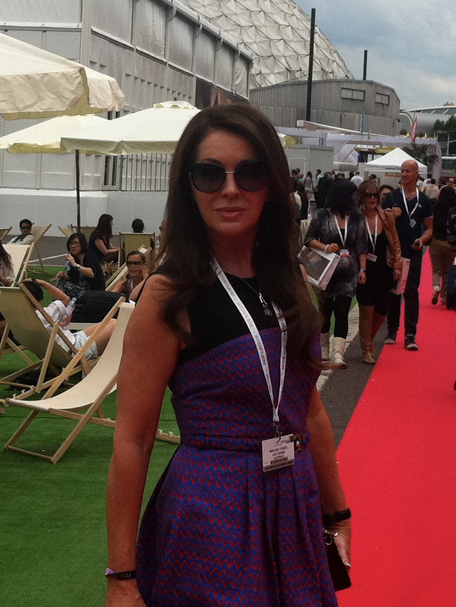
Kay Cohen

- Fiona Alpass – full professor at the Massey University.
- Kay Cohen (born 1952) – fashion designer
- Catherine Day – biochemist (BSc and PhD)
- Lucy Easthope – researcher
- Robert Holmes à Court (1937–1990) – businessman (BAgSci, forestry)
- Susan Kemp – social work academic
- Alan Kirton (1933–2001) – agricultural scientist (BAgrSc and MAgSc)
- Phil Lamason – WWII RNZAF pilot
- Kyle Lockwood – architectural designer, designer of the Silver fern flag (DipDArch and DipArchTech)
- Ross McEwan – banker, CEO of National Australia Bank
- Claire McLachlan – professor, specialist in early-childhood literacy
- Simon Moutter – engineer, businessman (BSc, physics)
- Craig Norgate – businessman
- Jaedyn Randell – singer
- Alan Stewart (1917–2004) – founding vice-chancellor of Massey
- Richard Taylor – special effects technician
- Stephen Tindall – businessman
- Saffronn Te Ratana – artist
- Mona Williams (born 1943) – writer and English lecturer

=== Honorary doctors ===
Massey University have recognised the contribution of many national and international notable people with honorary doctorates since 1964. Among them, there is Peng Liyuan, the first lady of the current Chinese leader Xi Jinping.

- List of honorary doctors of Massey University

== Controversies ==
Since the 2010s, Massey University has been involved in a number of public controversies and institutional challenges that have attracted national attention and prompted debate around governance, academic freedom, and financial sustainability.

In December 2010 Massey announced that the Wellington campus would close its School of Engineering and Advanced Technology the next month. Students were offered places at either the Albany or Manawatū campuses with compensation, but those who could not make the move and chose to undertake their degree elsewhere were given no compensation, and only a few papers were able to be cross-credited.

=== Chancellor Kelly's resignation ===
In December 2016, the Chancellor of the university, Chris Kelly, caused outrage by making several comments in a rural newspaper regarding the gender of those in the veterinarian profession. While outlining changes that were being made to the structure of the university's veterinarian and agricultural degrees, Kelly said that more women passed the first year of the veterinarian degree "because women mature earlier than men, work hard and pass. Whereas men find out about booze and all sorts of crazy things during their first year... That's fine, but the problem is one woman graduate is equivalent to two-fifths of a full-time equivalent vet throughout her life because she gets married and has a family, which is normal." These remarks caused widespread outrage, with Kelly's apology via Twitter and Facebook doing little to calm the situation. Kelly resigned as Chancellor on 14 December 2016, and was replaced promptly by then Pro Chancellor Michael Ahie.

=== 2018 Don Brash visit ===
In August 2018 Don Brash, a former Leader of the Opposition, was due to speak at the university following an invitation of the Massey University Politics Society. Citing security concerns, Jan Thomas, the Vice Chancellor of Massey University, cancelled the booking the student society had made to use university facilities. Thomas was widely criticised and calls were made for her resignation. The Prime Minister of New Zealand Jacinda Ardern described canceling the event as an overreaction. A review by Massey University's Council subsequently cleared Thomas of wrongdoing, with Chancellor Michael Ahie stating that the Council supported and had full confidence in Professor Thomas. Massey University's Māori staff association Te Matawhānui publicly spoke out in support of Thomas, particularly due to her leadership of Massey as a Treaty of Waitangi-led university.

=== RPNow Exam Monitoring (2020s) ===
Between 2020 and 2024, Massey University used an artificial intelligence remote exam monitoring tool called Remote Proctor Now (RPNow) to detect cheating in closed-book exams. The university stopped using it in 2024 after experiencing technical problems.

=== Singapore Campus Proposal and Restructuring (2023) ===
In 2023, Massey controversially proposed opening a campus in Singapore, aiming to have 5,000 students based offshore by 2026. The university's plans to expand overseas while cutting jobs at home angered staff and students at a time when significant cost cutting was taking place under Vice Chancellor Jan Thomas. The university reported a loss estimated at $50 million as of October 2023, which had previously been reported as $33 million in September 2023 and at $14.2 million deficit in July 2023. Cuts, including reducing staff numbers in the schools of Natural Sciences and Food and Advanced Technology by around 60 per cent, were described as 'brutal' with Radio New Zealand reporting fears the plan puts the university into a death spiral.

On 14 December 2023, Massey University confirmed that it would lay off over 60 jobs at its College of Sciences as part of a restructure. On 18 December, Massey confirmed that it was planning to sell or lease NZ$151 million worth of property on its three campuses to address its financial problems. The affected properties include nine buildings at the Albany campus including lecture halls and a recreation centre, four buildings in Wellington, and nine in Manawatū including two student villages and farmland. Under the proposed sale, the university would sell of much of its Albany campus except the new science building.

=== Defunding the Students' Association ===
In October 2024 Massey University announced it would no longer be funding their students' association- Te Tira Ahu Pae for 2025.

After receiving backlash from the student body who said the move would "set an alarming precedent for the future of independent student unionism in New Zealand" the university agreed to renew their contracts with the association.
