= Kay Cohen =

Australian fashion designer (born 1952)

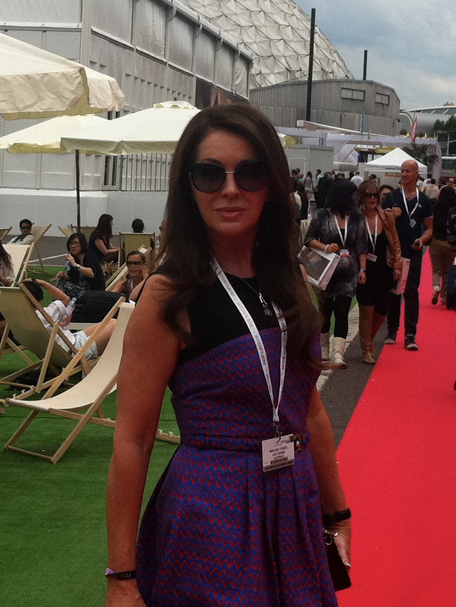
- Cohen in Paris 2011
- Born: 31 December 1952 (age 73); Levin, New Zealand
- Education: Massey University; Heriot-Watt University
- Occupation: Fashion designer
- Known for: Lingerie Design
- Labels: Silent Assembly; Curvessence; Pleasure State; Elle Macpherson Intimates

Kay Cohen (born Kathleen Siddall on 31 December 1952 in Levin, New Zealand) is an Australian fashion designer and business woman based in Sydney, Australia. Cohen has led a number of lingerie design brands, most notably as founder and creative director of Pleasure State and as general manager and creative director of Elle Macpherson Intimates. Cohen is the inventor of the Biofit uplift bra.

== Early life and education ==
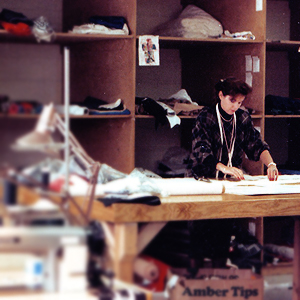
In her design studio Wellington, New Zealand

Cohen was raised on a farm and discovered fashion at the age of 12. She attended Wellington Polytechnic (now Massey University) in nearby Wellington, majoring in clothing and textile design. After graduation, she qualified and continued as a lecturer at the school, instructing fellow Australian fashion designer Collette Dinnigan. The first 15 years of Cohen's career were spent designing fashion outerwear. Cohen later qualified with an MBA from Heriot-Watt University, Edinburgh.

== Lingerie beginnings ==
Cohen transitioned to lingerie design in 1992, when she joined Triumph International, in Brisbane, Australia, where she was responsible for creative direction for brands including Triumph and Sloggi, and introduced Valisere to the Australian market. In 1997 Cohen returned to New Zealand and was appointed group general manager of brands for the New Zealand lingerie group Bendon. At Bendon, Cohen was known for her creative direction and successful reshaping of supermodel Elle Macpherson's lingerie label, Elle Macpherson Intimates, as well as leading creative for labels Bendon, Bendon Man, Hey Sister and Expozay swim.

== Elle Macpherson Intimates and the Bendon Group ==
During her time as creative director of Elle Macpherson Intimates, the label was credited as the top fashion underwear brand in Australian and UK department stores. In 1997 Cohen launched Macpherson Men, a men's underwear label which rapidly achieved commercial success in the Australian and New Zealand markets. The combined success of both Elle Macpherson Intimates and Macpherson Men prompted Bendon to increase the distribution of the Elle Macpherson underwear brands to the United Kingdom. In 2001 it was announced that the label would be stocked in Selfridges and House of Fraser in their London Stores.

In 2002, Cohen relaunched swimwear label Expozay, employing Australian actress/model Sophie Monk, as brand ambassador. (Cohen later worked with Monk for the launch of the Biofit Bra). Cohen's Expozay swim launch in Auckland New Zealand also featured Jennifer Hawkins two years before she won the Miss Universe title.

In 2002, after Bendon was acquired by the Pacific Retail Group, Cohen was identified as the most likely successor to the incumbent CEO. Cohen remained in a design capacity as she was headhunted and relocated to Australia in early 2003 to head creative direction for the Berlei Group, comprising brands Berlei, Formfit, Hestia, Playtex and Wonderbra. Within six months Cohen had become disillusioned by the prospect of putting new blood into old brands. Cohen perceived a niche in lingerie design: a fusion of fashion, fit and function. By early April 2004 reports of an Australian Fashion Week launch of Cohen's new luxury lingerie brand Pleasure State began to appear.

== Pleasure State ==
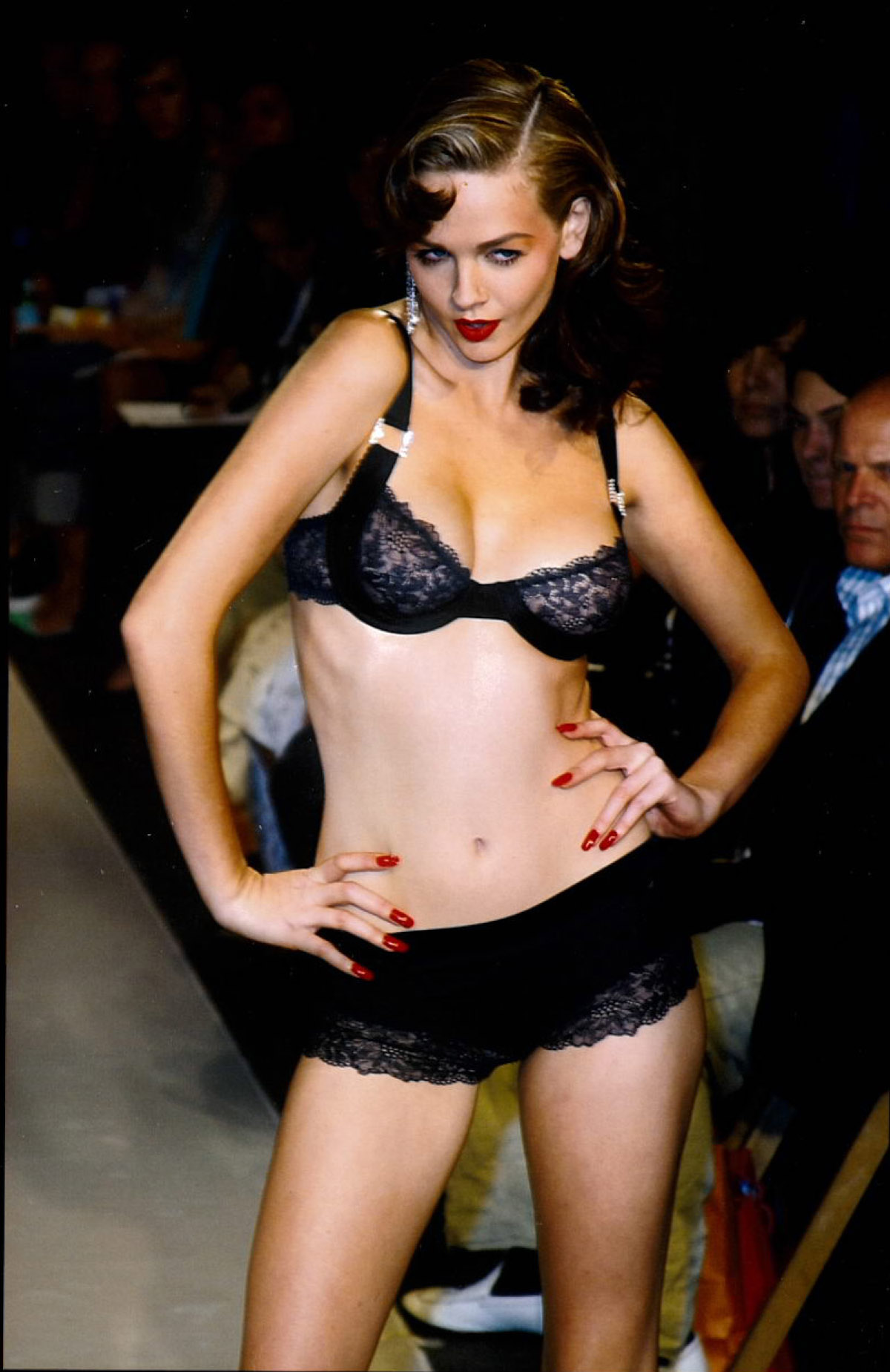
Australian Fashion Week in Sydney, Australia, wearing Pleasure State

Cohen launched Pleasure State at the Mercedes Australian Fashion Week 2004 in Sydney, with local fashion media voting Pleasure State as one of the top 10 shows. Prior to the launch, the brand had been picked up by Australian department store David Jones and Harrods, Selfridges, Bentalls, Liberty and House of Fraser in the United Kingdom.

=== Fashion Week Launch collection ===
The initial collection featured vintage French leavers lace and silks, complemented by the reintroduction of woven fabrics, opposed to traditional knits. The garments were accented with Swarovski crystal details, and are credited with originating this trend in lingerie design. The first collection was underpinned by wider bra straps and smooth-line tailoring, which became hallmarks of Pleasure State (now Pleasure State Couture). The fabrics included blends of pure silk with tactel and lycra, intended to enhance the performance of garments for everyday wearability, which were predominantly sourced from France and Italy.

=== International growth ===
By March 2005, Cohen's label had more than 300 stockists globally, including department stores Galeries Lafayette in Paris and Victoria's Secret. in the United States. By April of that year, Cohen's designs were available in 45 Victoria's Secret stores across the US and was one of only three international designer lingerie brands to be stocked alongside Victoria's Secret product. In November 2005 Cohen's label was available across Russia in 90 Wild Orchid Stores and opened the retailers fashion show at the Moscow Manege, quickly becoming their best selling brand. Within two years of the brand's launch, Cohen's label was available in 25 countries, and had launched its diffusion line Pleasure State White Label, renaming the high fashion Pleasure State: Pleasure State Couture. Pleasure State is currently available in 35 countries and more than 1000 stores globally.

Concurrently the brand shifted its Australian department store distribution to rival retailer Myer with a national roll out of in store boutiques. Cohen's designs were further bolstered by celebrities Jessica Simpson, Ashlee Simpson (appearing in the garments at the 2006 MTV Australia Music Awards), Rihanna and Anna Nicole Smith. By mid-2007 Cohen's label was turning over more than $AUD30 million per annum, and at this time Cohen announced the launch of the Biofit bra.

=== Biofit uplift bra ===
Cohen's Biofit uplift bra had the biggest bra launch in the history of Limited Brands (Victoria's Secret parent company). Cohen's innovation was to engineer a push-up bra customized to each cup size, delivering a graduation of cleavage appropriate to the woman's bust size. Cohen again worked with Sophie Monk for the Australian Biofit launch. Monk appeared in a music video where she performed Push It, which was mastered by her then fiancée Benji Madden. Due to the agreement with Victoria's Secret, Biofit was subsequently renamed Myfit in the Australian Market.

Cohen merged Pleasure State with her former company Bendon in May 2010, and has relinquished her interest in the company.

== Silent Assembly ==
Cohen launched a new brand Silent Assembly in Paris at the Mode City Lingerie fair in July 2013. Silent Assembly is a luxury lingerie label which features Cohen's new bra technology Curvessence, intended to replace underwires.
