= Nitha Palakshappa =

New Zealand professor of marketing

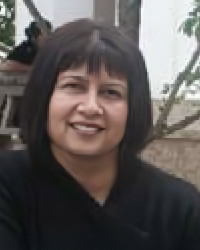

Academic background
- Education: University of Canterbury
- Thesis: Collaborative relationships in New Zealand : an exploratory examination (2003)
- Doctoral advisor: Robert T. Hamilton, Venkataraman Nilakant

Nitha Palakshappa, also known as Nitha Dolli, is a New Zealand marketing academic, and is a full professor at Massey University, specialising in sustainability and marketing in the fashion and food sectors.

== Academic career ==
Palakshappa completed a PhD titled Collaborative relationships in New Zealand: an exploratory examination at the University of Canterbury in 2003. Palakshappa then joined the faculty of the University of Waikato, and then Massey University, rising to associate professor in 2022, and full professor in 2024.

Palakshappa's research and teaching centre on sustainability in the fashion and food sectors, covering topics such as ethical value chains, conscious consumption, and how brands can meet sustainability goals. Palakshappa was involved in a Swedish research project funded through the Swedish Institute for Strategic Environmental Research, a cross-disciplinary study aimed at understanding how environmental communication could transform Sweden's sustainability. The marketing stream of the research worked with brands such as IKEA, Global Compact Network, Nudie Jeans, KappAhl, and H&M on sustainability reporting, transparency and social responsibility.

In New Zealand, Palakshappa has worked on food system sustainability, and was co-leader of the Farming to Flourish project in Taranaki. In this project Palakshappa worked with Sita Venkateswa (Massey), Dirk Roep (Wageningen University), and Carl Freeman (Farm Next Door and Freeman Farms) to learn how to educate people about farming, and how to encourage regenerative farming and diversify crops.

== Selected works ==
- Isabella Chaney; Nitha Dolli (2001). "Cause related marketing in New Zealand". International Journal of Nonprofit and Voluntary Sector Marketing. 6 (2): 156–163. doi:10.1002/nvsm.143. Wikidata Q124097114.
- Nitha Palakshappa; Mary Ellen Gordon (2007). "Collaborative business relationships: Helping firms to acquire skills and economies to prosper". Journal of Small Business and Enterprise Development. 14 (2): 264–279. doi:10.1108/14626000710746691. Wikidata Q124097141.
- Gabriel Eweje; Nitha Palakshappa (2009). "Business partnerships with nonprofits: working to solve mutual problems in New Zealand". Corporate Social Responsibility and Environmental Management. 16 (6): 337–351. doi:10.1002/csr.192. Wikidata Q124097244.
- Nitha Palakshappa; Mary Ellen Gordon (2006). "Using a multi‐method qualitative approach to examine collaborative relationships". Qualitative Market Research. 9 (4): 389–403. doi:10.1108/13522750610689104. Wikidata Q124097333.
- Nitha Palakshappa; Suzanne Grant (2017). "Social enterprise and corporate social responsibility: Toward a deeper understanding of the links and overlaps". International Journal of Entrepreneurial Behaviour and Research. 24 (3): 606–625. doi:10.1108/ijebr-05-2016-0131. Wikidata Q124097335.
- Nitha Palakshappa; Sarah Dodds (2020). "Mobilising SDG 12: co-creating sustainability through brands". Marketing Intelligence Planning. 39 (2): 265–283. doi:10.1108/mip-08-2018-0360. Wikidata Q124096375.
