= Ingleton =

Ingleton may refer to:

- Ingleton, County Durham
- Ingleton, North Yorkshire
- Christine Ingleton, British professor of palliative nursing
