= Sean Fingleton =

Irish painter (born 1950)

- Born: Sean Fingleton; 1950 (age 75–76)
- Education: University College Dublin; Letterkenny RTC; NCAD
- Occupation: Visual artist
- Known for: Painting (especially landscapes and seascapes)

Sean Fingleton (born 1950) is an Irish visual artist who works mainly in oil and is noted for Irish landscapes and seascapes.

== Biography ==
Fingleton was born in Malin, County Donegal in 1950. He attended University College Dublin, where he earned a BA in Philosophy and English Studies. He also received an H.Dip in Higher Education and studied art at Letterkenny RTC and the National College of Art and Design. In 2019, 8 pieces of his work related to Donegal were loaned to and placed on display at Letterkenny Institute of Technology, successor to one of his almae mater.

== Recognition and holdings ==
Fingleton received the Royal Hibernian Academy’s Fergus O'Ryan Award in 1983 and the Guinness Peat Aviation Emerging Artists Award in 1986, as well as the Independent Artists Painting Bursary. He was elected by his peers to the Irish national artists' academy, Aosdána.

Two of his works are in the collection of the Irish Museum of Modern Art, his painting, Coastal Scene, is part of the European Parliament art collection in Strasbourg, and his work is also on display at the Royal Hospital in Gloucester in England, and the residence of the President of Ireland, Aras an Uachtarain.
