= Alistair Davis (businessman) =

New Zealand business leader and university chancellor

Alistair Davis ONZM
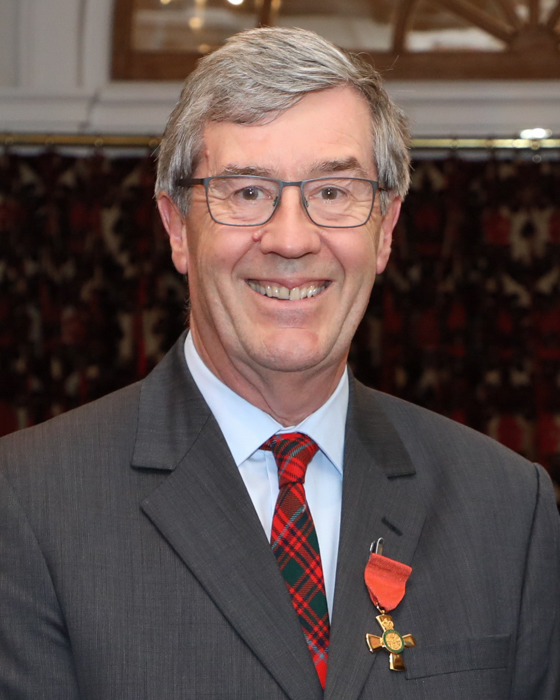
- Davis in 2021

13th Chancellor of Massey University
- Incumbent
- Assumed office 8 March 2024
- Preceded by: Michael Ahie

Personal details
- Born: Alistair Grant Davis
- Education: Victoria University of Wellington
- Occupation: Business executive

Alistair Grant Davis ONZM is a New Zealand business leader and sustainability advocate. He has served as the chancellor of Massey University since March 2024. He spent more than 40 years with Toyota New Zealand, including 12 years as chief executive officer, and was recognised in the 2021 New Year Honours, for services to the motor industry, business and sustainability.

== Early life and education ==
Davis grew up in Wellington and was educated at Wellington College. He then studied at Victoria University of Wellington, graduating in 1979 with Bachelor of Laws and Bachelor of Commerce and Administration degrees.

== Business career ==
The day after finishing his final university examination in 1979, Davis joined Toyota New Zealand as the company’s first graduate hire. Over three decades he worked across virtually every part of the organisation before being appointed chief executive officer in 2008. His tenure introduced customer-centric innovations such as the National Customer Service Centre in Palmerston North, the expansion of Toyota Finance and the launch of Lexus in New Zealand. While at Toyota, he introduced the Agency business model to improve customer service. He also sat on the boards of Toyota Australia and Toyota Finance New Zealand and chaired the Sustainable Business Council Advisory Board. After retiring as CEO in June 2020, he served as chair of Toyota New Zealand until 2022.

== Sustainability leadership ==
Committed to corporate responsibility, Davis co-founded the Climate Leaders Coalition in 2018 to encourage collective action on reducing greenhouse-gas emissions. He continues to write and speak on sustainable transport and regenerative business practice and serves on several external sustainability advisory panels.

== Massey University governance ==
Davis first became involved with Massey University through its College of Business advisory board, which he chaired until 2015. He joined the university council in 2018, and was elected pro chancellor in November 2023. On 8 March 2024, he succeeded Michael Ahie as chancellor, chairing the Council and presiding at graduation ceremonies.

== Honours and awards ==
In the 2021 New Year Honours, Davis was appointed an Officer of the New Zealand Order of Merit, for services to the motor industry, business and sustainability.

== Personal life ==
Davis lives in Palmerston North and is active in the All Saints Anglican parish. He is married with three adult children and enjoys trail running and tramping in his spare time.
