= Jane Mills =

Health researcher

Jane Elizabeth Mills
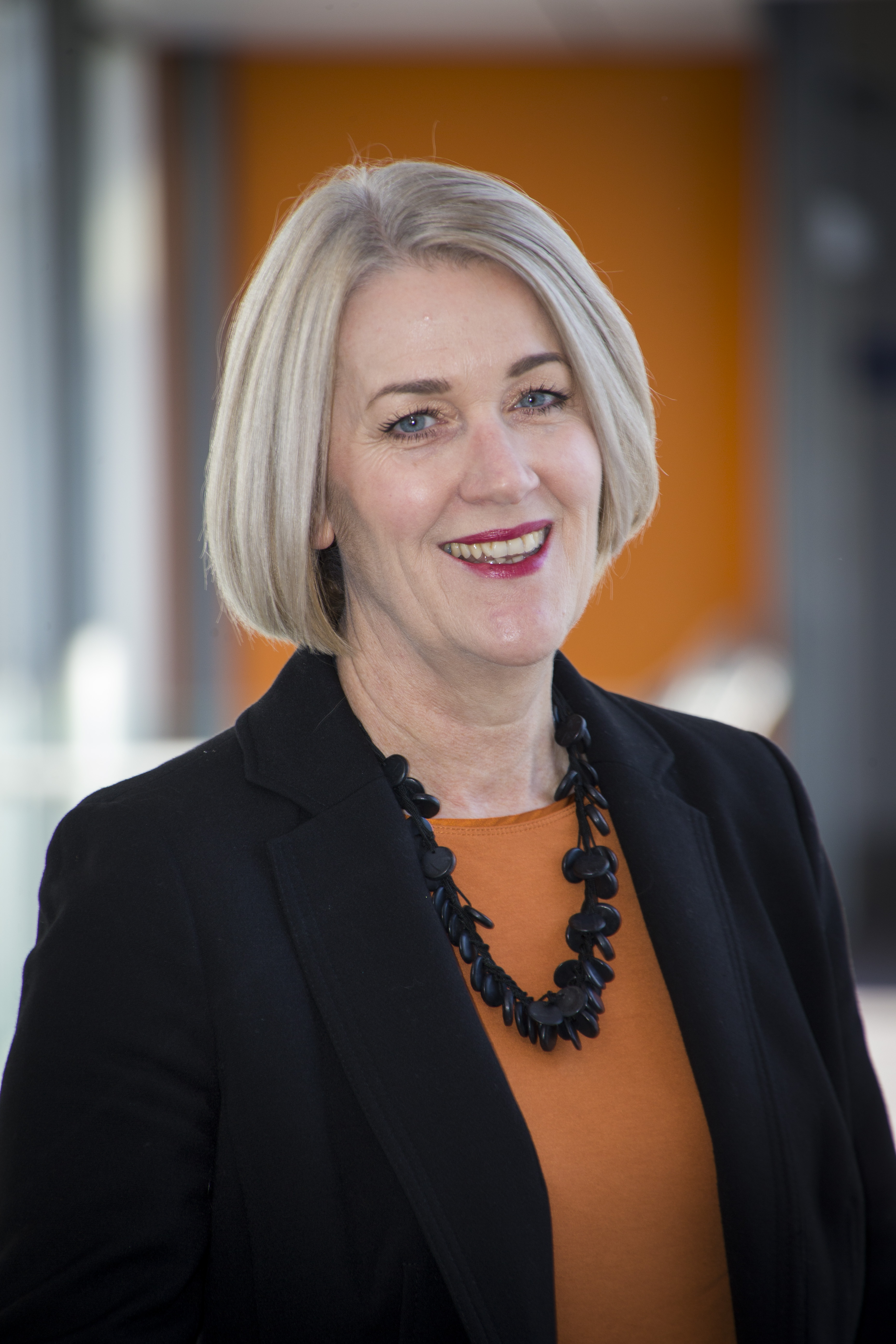
- Born: Launceston, Tasmania, Australia
- Education: Monash University, PhD, Charles Sturt University MEd, Imperial College London MBA, UTas MN
- Known for: Grounded Theory
- Children: Emma Mills, Alec Mills
- Scientific career
- Fields: Constructivist Grounded Theory
- Workplaces: La Trobe University, Massey University, James Cook University, Monash University
- Thesis: Australian rural nurses' experiences of mentoring : a constructivist grounded theory study (2006)
- Doctoral advisor: Professor Karen Francis and Professor Ann Bonner

Jane Elizabeth Mills is an Australian-New Zealand academic and as of 2020 is the Dean and Head, La Trobe Rural Health School, Bendigo, Victoria, Australia.

== Academic career ==
After a 2006 PhD titled 'Australian rural nurses' experiences of mentoring : a constructivist grounded theory study' at the Monash University, Mills moved to James Cook University, Cairns where she undertook a number of different roles before being promoted to Professor (Promotional Chair). After completing an MBA at Imperial College, London she moved to Massey University, as the Pro Vice Chancellor of the College of Health. Mills is currently employed at La Trobe University as the Dean and Head of the La Trobe Rural Health School. Mills remains an adjunct professor at both Massey University and James Cook University.

Mills' best known work relates to constructivist grounded theory and in particular her book with Professor Melanie Birks Grounded Theory a Practical Guide. Published by Sage, this text is considered to be one of the most contemporary guides to grounded theory methodology/methods and is widely used by higher degree research candidates.

== Selected works ==
- Birks, Melanie; Hoare, Karen; Mills, Jane (1 January 2019). "Grounded Theory: The FAQs". International Journal of Qualitative Methods. 18. doi:10.1177/1609406919882535. ISSN 1609-4069.
- Harrison, Helena; Birks, Melanie; Franklin, Richard; Mills, Jane (24 January 2017). "Case Study Research: Foundations and Methodological Orientations". Forum Qualitative Sozialforschung / Forum: Qualitative Social Research. 18 (1). doi:10.17169/fqs-18.1.2655. ISSN 1438-5627.
- Birks, Melanie; Mills, Jane (2011). Grounded theory: a practical guide (1. publ ed.). Los Angeles: SAGE. ISBN 978-1-84860-993-8.
- Redman-MacLaren, Michelle; Mills, Jane (July 2015). "Transformational Grounded Theory: Theory, Voice, and Action". International Journal of Qualitative Methods. 14 (3): 1–12. doi:10.1177/160940691501400301. ISSN 1609-4069.
- Mills, J., & Birks, M. (2014). Qualitative Methodologies: a practical guide. London, UK: Sage.
- Redman-MacLaren, Michelle; Mills, Jane; Tommbe, Rachael (18 August 2014). "Interpretive focus groups: a participatory method for interpreting and extending secondary analysis of qualitative data". Global Health Action. 7 (1) 10.3402/gha.v7.25214. doi:10.3402/gha.v7.25214. ISSN 1654-9716. PMC 4138497. PMID 25138532.
- Nurjannah, Intansari; Mills, Jane; Park, Tanya; Usher, Kim (1 January 2014). "Conducting a Grounded Theory Study in a Language Other Than English". SAGE Open. 4 (1). doi:10.1177/2158244014528920. ISSN 2158-2440.
- Chamberlain-Salaun, Jennifer; Mills, Jane; Usher, Kim (1 July 2013). "Linking Symbolic Interactionism and Grounded Theory Methods in a Research Design". SAGE Open. 3 (3). doi:10.1177/2158244013505757. ISSN 2158-2440.
- Whiteside, Mary; Mills, Jane; McCalman, Janya (1 December 2012). "Using Secondary Data for Grounded Theory Analysis". Australian Social Work. 65 (4): 504–516. doi:10.1080/0312407X.2011.645165. ISSN 0312-407X.
- Hoare, Karen J; Mills, Jane; Francis, Karen (2012). "Sifting, sorting and saturating data in a grounded theory study of information use by practice nurses: A worked example". International Journal of Nursing Practice. 18 (6): 582–588. doi:10.1111/ijn.12007. ISSN 1440-172X. PMID 23181960.
- Hoare, Karen J; Mills, Jane; Francis, Karen (24 May 2012). "Dancing with data: An example of acquiring theoretical sensitivity in a grounded theory study". International Journal of Nursing Practice. 18 (3): 240–245. doi:10.1111/j.1440-172x.2012.02038.x. ISSN 1322-7114. PMID 22621293.
- Mills, Jane; Birks, Melanie; Hegney, Desley (March 2010). "The status of rural nursing in Australia: 12 years on". Collegian. 17 (1): 30–37. doi:10.1016/j.colegn.2009.09.001. ISSN 1322-7696. PMID 20394272.
- Birks, Melanie; Mills, Jane; Francis, Karen; Chapman, Ysanne (1 September 2009). "A thousand words paint a picture: The use of storyline in grounded theory research". Journal of Research in Nursing. 14 (5): 405–417. doi:10.1177/1744987109104675. ISSN 1744-9871.
- Mills, Jane; Chapman, Ysanne; Bonner, Ann; Francis, Karen (28 March 2007). "Grounded theory: a methodological spiral from positivism to postmodernism". Journal of Advanced Nursing. 58 (1): 72–79. doi:10.1111/j.1365-2648.2007.04228.x. hdl:10072/400385. ISSN 0309-2402. PMID 17394618.
- Mills, Jane; Bonner, Ann; Francis, Karen (1 March 2006). "The Development of Constructivist Grounded Theory". International Journal of Qualitative Methods. 5 (1): 25–35. doi:10.1177/160940690600500103. ISSN 1609-4069.
- Mills, Jane; Bonner, Ann; Francis, Karen (10 January 2006). "Adopting a constructivist approach to grounded theory: Implications for research design". International Journal of Nursing Practice. 12 (1): 8–13. doi:10.1111/j.1440-172x.2006.00543.x. ISSN 1322-7114. PMID 16403191.
