= Hugh Patrick McKenna =

Irish academic (born 1954)

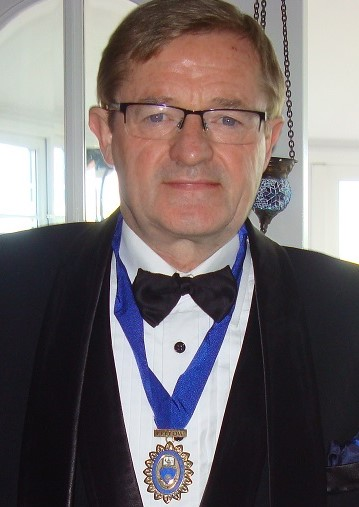
- Born: 25 January 1954 (age 72); Monaghan
- Known for: Research in Nursing

Academic background
- Education: University of London; Ulster University

Academic work
- Discipline: Nursing
- Institutions: Ulster University

Hugh Patrick McKenna CBE FRCN (born 25 January 1954) is a British academic. He was Dean of Medical School Development at Ulster University.

McKenna served on the 2001 U.K. Research Assessment Exercise panel for nursing, chaired the panel for Nursing and Midwifery in the 2008 U.K. Research Assessment Exercise and chaired the sub-panel for Dentistry, Allied Health Professions, Nursing and Pharmacy sub-panel in the 2014 U.K. Research Excellence Framework. He chairs the sub-panel for Dentistry, Allied Health Professions, Nursing and Pharmacy sub-panel in the 2021 U.K. Research Excellence Framework and as a member of the 2021 U.K. Research Excellence Framework Interdisciplinary Research Advisory Panel. He was a founding member of The Lancet Commission on Nursing and is a Trustee of the Alzheimer's Society.

== Education ==
McKenna is a Registered Nurse, holds a BSc in nursing from Ulster University and a PhD in nursing from Ulster University.

== Career ==
McKenna has served as: director of research, Centre for Nursing Research (now the Institute for Nursing and Health Research); head of School of Health Sciences; head of School of Nursing; dean, Faculty of Health and Life Sciences; and pro-vice chancellor for research and innovation at Ulster University. He is an adjunct professor at the University of Technology Sydney and a member of the Quality Assurance Council of the Hong Kong University Grants Committee. in 2018 he chaired the Swedish Research Council's Medical Research Review. McKenna is Honorary Colonel of 253 GS Medical Regiment(v). and in 2014, he co-founded the UK Military Veterans and Emergency Services Committee and the RCN's Defence Nurses’ Network.

== Recognition ==
McKenna was appointed a Commander of the British Empire (CBE) in the 2008 New Years Honours list. He is a fellow of the Royal College of Nursing (2003), the American Academy of Nursing (2009), and the Royal College of Surgeons in Ireland Faculty of Nursing and Midwifery ad eundem (1999). In 2013 McKenna was awarded an Outstanding Achievement Award by the Royal College of Nursing, in 2016 an honorary doctorate from Edinburgh Napier University and in 2018 was named among the most influential nurses by inspire. In 2004 McKenna delivered the Winifred Raphael Memorial lecture at the Royal College of Nursing Congress. McKenna is a Member of the Academia Europaea (2019).

== Personal life ==
McKenna is married with two children.

== Publications ==
Mckenna has 331 publications on Google Scholar. They have been cited over 15,000 times giving him an h-index of 49.

=== Books ===
- McKenna HP (1997) Nursing theories and models Routledge, London ISBN 0-415-14222-9
- Ketefian S, McKenna HP (2004) Doctoral education in nursing: an international perspective Routledge, London ISBN 978-0-415-31900-3
- Watson R, McKenna HP, Keady J, Cowman S (2008) Nursing research: methods and designs Elsevier, Edinburgh ISBN 978-0-443-10277-6
- McKenna HP, Pajnikihar M, Murphy F (2014) Fundamentals of models, theories and practice Wiley Blackwell, Oxford ISBN 978-0-470-65776-8
