= Journal of Clinical Nursing =

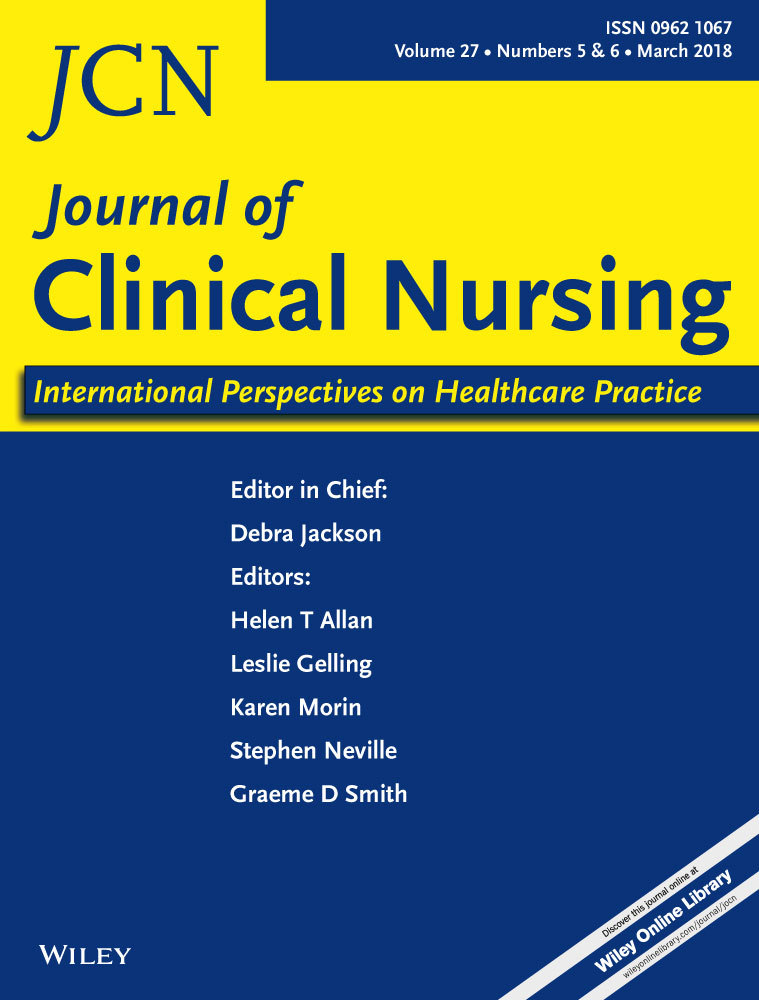
- Discipline: Nursing
- Language: English
- Edited by: Mark Hayter

Publication details
- History: 1990–present
- Publisher: Wiley
- Frequency: Monthly
- Impact factor: 4.423 (2021)

Standard abbreviations
- ISO 4: J. Clin. Nurs.

Indexing
- ISSN: 1365-2702
- OCLC no.: 818922681

Links
- Journal homepage; Online access; Online archive

The Journal of Clinical Nursing (also known as JCN) is a monthly peer-reviewed medical journal covering all aspects of nursing. It is published by John Wiley & Sons.

== History ==
The journal was established in 1990 with Christine Webb as founding editor-in-chief. Subsequent editors-in-chief were Roger Watson and Debra Jackson. The current editor-in-chief is Mark Hayter, of the Manchester Metropolitan University.

== Abstracting and indexing ==
The journal is abstracted and indexed in:

- CINAHL
- Current Contents/Social & Behavioral Sciences
- EBSCO databases
- Index Medicus/MEDLINE/PubMed
- ProQuest databases
- PsycINFO
- Science Citation Index Expanded
- Scopus
- Social Sciences Citation Index

According to the Journal Citation Reports, the journal has a 2021 impact factor of 4.423.
