= Journal of Advanced Nursing =

- Discipline: Nursing
- Language: English
- Edited by: Debra Jackson

Publication details
- History: 1976–present
- Publisher: Wiley
- Frequency: Monthly
- Impact factor: 3.187 (2020)

Standard abbreviations
- ISO 4: J. Adv. Nurs.

Indexing
- ISSN: 0309-2402 (print); 1365-2648 (web)
- OCLC no.: 896750387

Links
- Journal homepage; Online access; Online archive

The Journal of Advanced Nursing (also known as JAN) is a monthly peer-reviewed medical journal covering all aspects of nursing. It is published by John Wiley & Sons.

== History ==
The journal was established in 1976 with James P. Smith as founding editor-in-chief. Subsequent editors-in-chief were Jane Robinson, Alison J. Tierney and Roger Watson. The current editor-in-chief is Debra Jackson (University of Sydney).

== Abstracting and indexing ==
The journal is abstracted and indexed in:

- CINAHL
- Current Contents/Social & Behavioral Sciences
- EBSCO databases
- Index Medicus/MEDLINE/PubMed
- ProQuest databases
- PsycINFO
- Science Citation Index Expanded
- Scopus
- Social Sciences Citation Index

According to the Journal Citation Reports, the journal has a 2019 impact factor of 2.376.
