= John Fingleton (economist) =

Irish economist and public official (b. 1965)

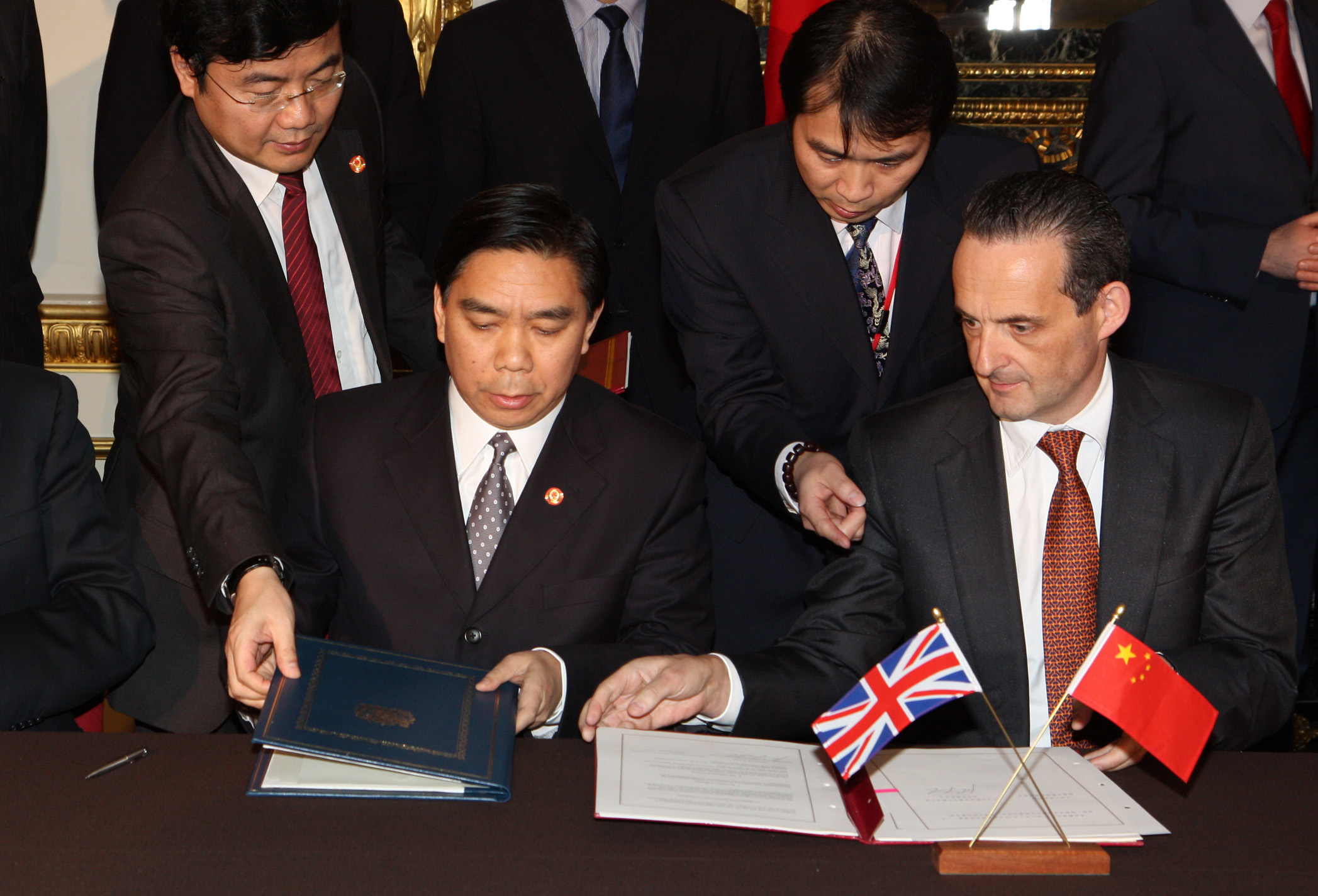
John Fingleton, Chief Executive, Office of Fair Trading (far right) signs a Memorandum of Understanding with Xu Xianping, Vice Chairman of National Development and Reform Commission in London, 10 January 2011.

John Anthony Fingleton CBE (born 21 September 1965) is an Irish-British economist and former CEO of the Office of Fair Trading. He is Senior Independent Member of the Innovate UK Board.

== Early life and career ==
Fingleton was born in September 1965, he studied economics at Trinity College Dublin and Nuffield College Oxford, writing his PhD under supervision from James Mirrlees and graduating with a DPhil in 1991.

After graduating from Oxford, Fingleton taught economics at the London School of Economics and Trinity College Dublin. While an academic at TCD, he advocated deregulation of the Irish taxi market and a relaxation of restrictive licensing laws in alcohol retail. In 2000, Fingleton was appointed chairman of the Competition Authority of Ireland - where he made a number of prominent hires including former FTC Commissioner Terry Calvani. Fingleton was also responsible for managing the introduction of the Irish Competition Act 2002 into law.

== Office of Fair Trading ==
In 2005, Fingleton was appointed Chief Executive of the Office of Fair Trading. While at the OfT, he led investigations into bank overdraft fees, competition between supermarkets, credit cards, and the PPI market, as well as an investigation into UK airports that led to the breakup of BAA. Fingleton was criticised during his tenure for his high salary, which at £275,000 made him the second-highest paid civil servant in the UK, after the Governor of the Bank of England.

Fingleton left the OfT in 2012, just before it and the Competition Commission were merged to form the new Competition and Markets Authority. He was succeeded by Clive Maxwell.

== Later career ==
Fingleton now runs a company advising businesses with competition and regulation problems. In 2015, he called for BT and Openreach to be split up to increase competition in the broadband market. In 2018, he wrote a report attacking the government's plans to expand the national security test in mergers, which he warned would be damaging to the UK economy.

On 30 October 2023, Federal Treasurer Jim Chalmers appointed Fingleton to the Competition Taskforce Advisory Panel, which has been established to advise the Treasury on national competition policy.

In 2025 he led the Nuclear Regulatory Taskforce, looking at ways to improve the operation of the Office for Nuclear Regulation.

== Public office ==
Fingleton is a board member of UKRI and Fingleton was appointed Commander of the Order of the British Empire (CBE) in the 2022 New Year Honours for services to the economy and innovation.
