= Merryn Gott =

New Zealand nursing academic

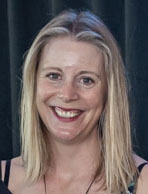
- Born: Caryl Merryn Gott
- Education: University of Sheffield
- Scientific career
- Workplaces: University of Auckland
- Thesis: Sexual activity, sexually transmitted diseases and risk behaviour among older adults (2000)

Caryl Merryn Gott is a New Zealand social science academic specialising in palliative care. She is currently a full professor at the University of Auckland.

== Academic career ==
After a 2000 PhD titled 'Sexual activity, sexually transmitted diseases and risk behaviour among older adults' at the University of Sheffield, She was appointed a full professor at the University of Auckland.

Gott won the 2014 Research Medal (now the Hill Tinsley Medal) from the New Zealand Association of Scientists. In 2016 she was named NEXT Woman of the Year Health and Science In 2019, Gott was elected a Fellow of the Royal Society of New Zealand.

Gott is perhaps best known for working in bi-cultural palliative care.

== Selected works ==
- Gott, Merryn, and Sharron Hinchliff. "How important is sex in later life? The views of older people." Social Science & Medicine 56, no. 8 (2003): 1617–1628.
- Gott, Merryn, Elisabeth Galena, Sharron Hinchliff, and Helen Elford. "“Opening a can of worms”: GP and practice nurse barriers to talking about sexual health in primary care." Family practice 21, no. 5 (2004): 528–536.
- Gott, Merryn, Sharron Hinchliff, and Elisabeth Galena. "General practitioner attitudes to discussing sexual health issues with older people." Social Science & Medicine 58, no. 11 (2004): 2093–2103.
- Gott, Merryn, Jane Seymour, Gary Bellamy, David Clark, and Sam Ahmedzai. "Older people's views about home as a place of care at the end of life." Palliative medicine 18, no. 5 (2004): 460–467.
- Gott, Merryn, and Sharron Hinchliff. "Barriers to seeking treatment for sexual problems in primary care: a qualitative study with older people." Family practice 20, no. 6 (2003): 690–695.
- Broad, Joanna B., Merryn Gott, Hongsoo Kim, Michal Boyd, He Chen, and Martin J. Connolly. "Where do people die? An international comparison of the percentage of deaths occurring in hospital and residential aged care settings in 45 populations, using published and available statistics." International journal of public health 58, no. 2 (2013): 257–267.
