= Palliative Medicine (journal) =

Academic journal for Palliative Medicine

- Discipline: Palliative Medicine & Chronic Care
- Language: English
- Edited by: Catherine Walshe

Publication details
- History: 1987–present
- Publisher: SAGE Publications
- Frequency: 10/year
- Impact factor: 4.956 (2018)

Standard abbreviations
- ISO 4: Palliat. Med.

Indexing
- ISSN: 0269-2163 (print); 1477-030X (web)
- OCLC no.: 57055576

Links
- Journal homepage; Online access; Online archive

Palliative Medicine is a peer-reviewed academic journal that publishes papers in the field of medicine. The journal's editor is Catherine Walshe (Lancaster University). It has been in publication since 1987 and is currently published by SAGE Publications on behalf of the European Association for Palliative Care.

== Scope ==
Palliative Medicine is a highly ranked, peer reviewed scholarly journal dedicated to improving knowledge and clinical practice in the palliative care of patients with advanced disease. It reflects the multidisciplinary approach that is the hallmark of effective palliative care.

== Abstracting and indexing ==
Palliative Medicine is abstracted and indexed in, among other databases: SCOPUS, and the Social Sciences Citation Index. According to the Journal Citation Reports, its 2018 impact factor was 4.956. It is ranked 6 out of 98 in Health Care Sciences & Services, 15 out of 185 in Public, Environmental & Occupational Health (SCI) and 17 out of 160 in Medicine, General & Internal.
