= Advances in Neonatal Care =

- Discipline: Neonatal nursing
- Language: English
- Edited by: Debra H. Brandon and Jacqueline M. McGrath

Publication details
- History: 2001–present
- Publisher: Lippincott Williams & Wilkins (United States)
- Frequency: Bimonthly
- Impact factor: 1.244 (2018)

Standard abbreviations
- ISO 4: Adv. Neonatal Care

Indexing
- ISSN: 1536-0903 (print); 1536-0911 (web)
- LCCN: 2001211728
- OCLC no.: 47348509

Links
- Journal homepage; Online access; Online archive; Instructions for Authors; Submit an Article

Advances in Neonatal Care is a bimonthly peer-reviewed healthcare journal of neonatal nursing. It is the official journal of the National Association of Neonatal Nurses.

== See also ==
- Journal of Obstetric, Gynecologic, & Neonatal Nursing
- Neonatal Network: The Journal of Neonatal Nursing
- List of nursing journals
