= Thomas John Murray =

Canadian neurologist and medical historian

Thomas John Murray OC ONS
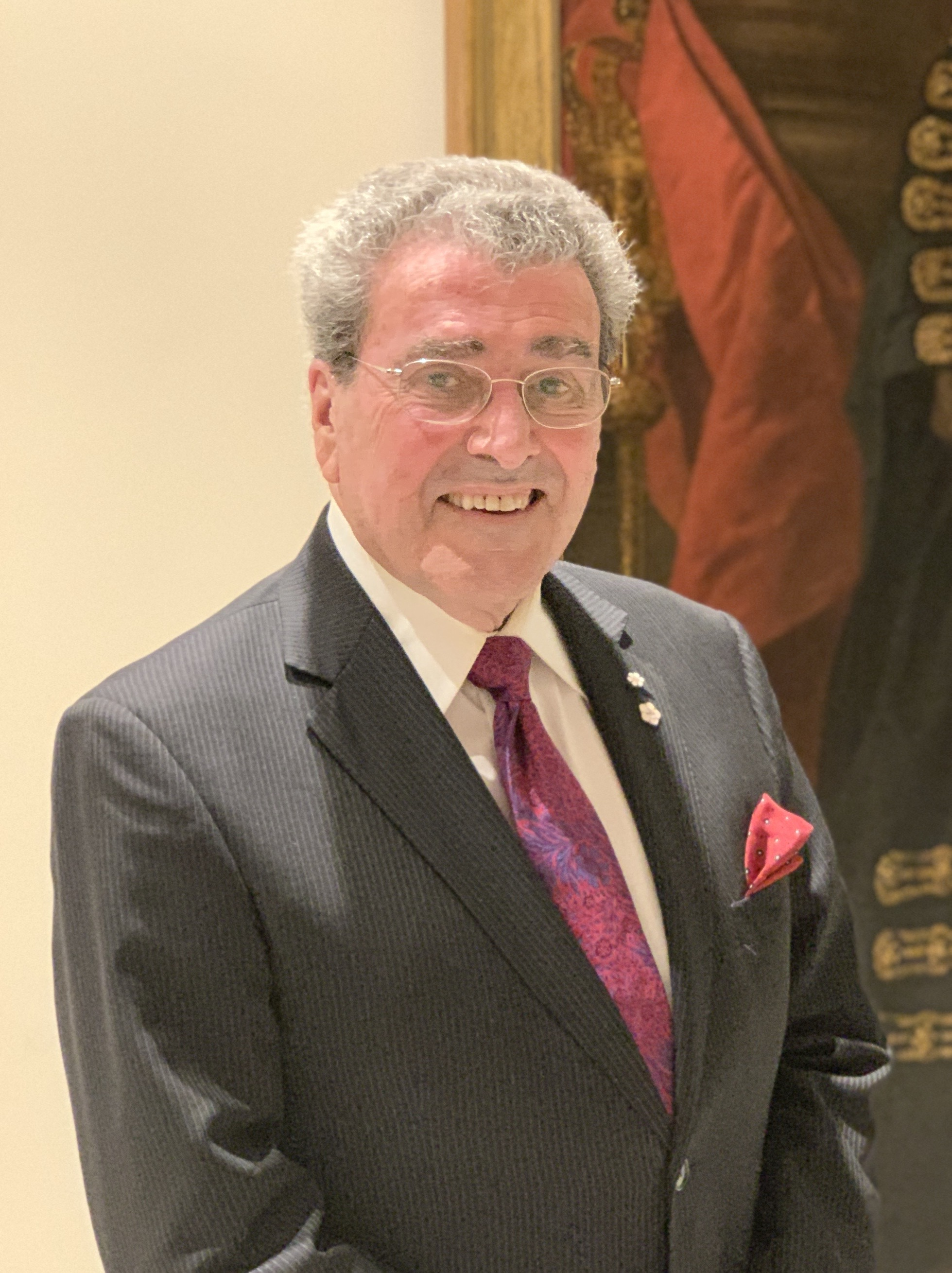
- Jock Murray, Royal College of Physicians, London (2019)
- Born: May 1938 (age 87–88); Pictou, Nova Scotia, Canada
- Education: St. Francis Xavier University
- Medical career
- Profession: Neurologist
- Institutions: Dalhousie University School of Medicine
- Notable works: Multiple Sclerosis: The History of a Disease

Thomas John "Jock" Murray OC ONS (born May 1938) is a Canadian neurologist, medical historian and author.

Following his neurology training, Murray joined the faculty of medicine at Dalhousie in 1970. He was the founding director of the Dalhousie Multiple Sclerosis Research Unit, co-founder of the Consortium of North American Multiple Sclerosis Centres, chair of the Canadian Medical Forum, president of the Canadian Neurological Society and of the Association of Canadian Medical Colleges, vice-president of the American Academy of Neurology, chair of the board of governors and chair of the board of regents for the American College of Physicians, and served as dean of Medicine at Dalhousie.

His published works include Sir Charles Tupper: Fighting Doctor to Father of Confederation (1999), which he co-authored with his wife, Multiple Sclerosis: The History of a Disease (2005), and The Quotable Osler. American College of Physicians, Philadelphia (2008), which he co-edited with Mark E. Silverman and Charles S. Bryan.

== Early life and education ==
Thomas John "Jock" Murray was born in May 1938 into the Scottish community of Pictou, Nova Scotia as the third eldest of ten children. 'Jock' was the Scottish nickname for John. His father edited and published a weekly newspaper and his mother wrote columns for the paper. He was educated at St. Francis Xavier University, Antigonish and the Dalhousie University School of Medicine, Halifax.

Murray was commissioned into the Navy in 1958. In 1963, he graduated in medicine and worked in general practice for two years, following which he returned to Halifax to train in internal medicine.

== Medical career ==
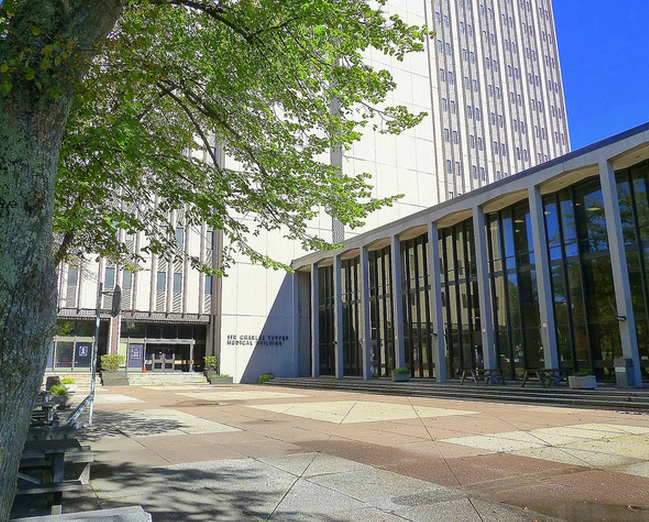
Faculty of medicine at Dalhousie

Following his neurology training in Halifax, London, and Toronto, Murray joined the faculty of medicine at Dalhousie in 1970.

He became the founding director of the Dalhousie Multiple Sclerosis Research Unit, and helped found the Consortium of North American Multiple Sclerosis Centres, and served as its president. Murray also served as chair of the Canadian Medical Forum, as president of the Canadian Neurological Society and of the Association of Canadian Medical Colleges, and as vice-president of the American Academy of Neurology. He was chair of the board of governors and chair of the board of regents for the American College of Physicians.

He served as dean of Medicine at Dalhousie from 1985 to 1992. In addition to becoming Professor of Medicine and of Medical Humanities, he was head of Neurology. In 1996, he contributed to the report presented to President Clinton by the Working Group on Disability in US Presidents.

== Writing ==
Murray has published more than 300 articles, a number of books on neurology subjects and 43 chapters. In 1999, he co-authored Sir Charles Tupper: Fighting Doctor to Father of Confederation with his wife. As well as archival evidence from the Nova Scotia provincial archives and published material, they studied Charles Tupper's family recollections to present both his medical and political career.

In 2005, he published Multiple Sclerosis: The History of a Disease. He co-edited a book on Sir William Osler's quotations.

== Honours and awards ==
In 1973, he was awarded the Professor of the Year award from medical students at Dalhousie University. He was named an officer of the Order of Canada in 1991, the Canada 125th Anniversary Medal the following year and the John B. Neilson Award of the Associated Medical Services and Hannah Institute for the History of Medicine in 1995. In 1997, he received the Dr. A. B. Baker Award for Lifetime Achievement in Neurological Education from the Academy of Neurology and in 2000, was awarded the Labe Scheinberg Award for Lifetime Contributions to Multiple Sclerosis from the Consortium of Multiple Sclerosis Centres. In 2001, he received both the Mentor of the Year Award from the Royal College of Physicians and Surgeons of Canada and the Queen Elizabeth II Jubilee Medal. St. Francis Xavier University and Acadia University have honoured him with honorary degrees.

He was the founder of the Dalhousie Society for the History of Medicine and served as its first president. He also served as president of the Canadian Society for the History of Medicine. He is also a member of the Order of Nova Scotia. In 2014, Murray was inducted into the Canadian Medical Hall of Fame.

== Personal and family ==
Murray met Janet when he became a university officer cadet in Halifax in 1958, and they had their first date alone at the Carleton Hotel. They married two years later and have four children and seven grandchildren.

== Selected publications ==
=== Books ===
- Sir Charles Tupper: Fighting Doctor to Father of Confederation. Associated Medical Services (1999). Co-authored with Janet Murray. ISBN 9781550411836
- Multiple Sclerosis: The History of a Disease. Demos Medical Publishing, New York (2005). ISBN 1-888799-80-3
- The Quotable Osler. American College of Physicians, Philadelphia (2008). Co-edited with Mark E. Silverman and Charles S. Bryan. ISBN 978-1934465004
- Noble Goals, Dedicated Doctors: The Story of Dalhousie Medical School. Nimbus Publishing Limited (2017). ISBN 9781771085298

=== Book chapters ===
- "An appalling sudden death" in Jacalyn Duffin's Clio in the Clinic: History in Medical Practice. University of Toronto Press (2005). ISBN 0802038549

=== Articles ===
- Murray, TJ (2009). "Read any good books lately?". Mcgill J Med. 12: 90–1. PMC 2687923. PMID 19753296.
- — (2009). "The history of multiple sclerosis: the changing frame of the disease over the centuries". Journal of the Neurological Sciences. 277: S3–S8. doi:10.1016/S0022-510X(09)70003-6.
- — (2017). "Serving two masters: the medical and political careers of Sir Charles Tupper". Canadian Medical Association Journal. 189: E866–E868. doi:10.1503/cmaj.170224. PMC 5489394. PMID 28652483.
