= Daniel Sokol =

British barrister

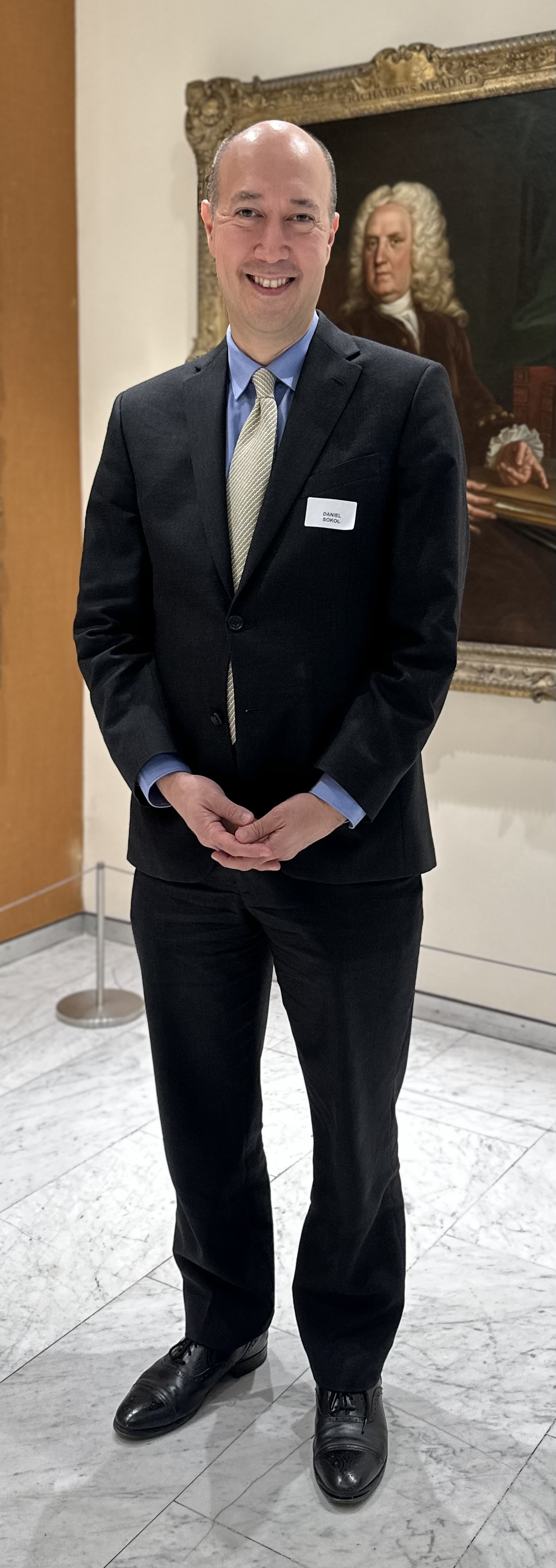
- Daniel Sokol, Royal College of Physicians (2023)
- Born: 1978 (age 47–48); Puyricard, France
- Other name: Ethics Man
- Education: Winchester College
- Alma mater: University of Oxford (BA); Imperial College London (PhD)
- Known for: Medical ethics President of the Osler Club of London (2023-2025)
- Scientific career
- Fields: Medical ethics
- Workplaces: Keele University; King's College London; St George's, University of London
- Thesis: Truth-telling and deception in contemporary medical practice : an empirical and philosophical analysis (2006)
- Doctoral advisor: Tim Rhodes; Raanan Gillon
- Website: medicalethicist.net

Daniel K. Sokol (born 1978) is a barrister, medical ethicist, and international lecturer, known for his academic and journalistic writings on the ethics of medicine. He is a member of 12 King's Bench Walk, a barristers' chambers in London, England.

Under the sobriquet Ethics Man, Sokol writes a regular column in the British Medical Journal. He has criticised the decision making practices of university panels and, in response, founded Alpha Academic Appeals in 2012 to support students challenging unfair academic outcomes.

== Early life and education ==
Daniel Sokol was born in Puyricard, France, to Ronald P. Sokol, and educated in France until the age of 11. He attended Winchester College before studying Linguistics and French Literature at St Edmund Hall, Oxford. He received his Bachelor of Arts in 2001 and obtained a Wellcome Trust Award to study a master's degree in Social and Economic History (specialising in the History of Medicine) at Green College, Oxford. He then studied for a Master's in Medical Ethics at Imperial College London and, under the supervision of Raanan Gillon and Tim Rhodes, completed a PhD in the subject, also funded by the Wellcome Trust.

Following his PhD, he was appointed a lecturer in Ethics at Keele University. In 2008, he moved to St George's, University of London, before qualifying as a barrister at the Inner Temple in 2011.

== Career ==
In 2005, while senior lecturer in Clinical Ethics at Imperial College, London, Sokol co-authored, with Gillian Bergson, a textbook on medical ethics and law for students. Since 2007, he has written a regular column, as Ethics Man, for the British Medical Journal. In 2012, Sokol published Doing Clinical Ethics, a textbook for clinicians.

In October 2018 Book Guild Publishing released his book Tough Choices, a text aimed at a general readership.

Sokol set up the Centre for Remedial Ethics in November 2019, which provides one-to-one medical ethics courses to clinicians undergoing disciplinary procedures.

== University student appeals ==
Sokol has criticised the decision making practices of university panels, arguing that procedural shortcomings can result in unjust outcomes with serious consequences for students. In response, he founded Alpha Academic Appeals in late 2012 to provide professional support for students seeking to challenge unfair academic decisions. This led to King's College London terminating his appointment as an honorary member of the teaching staff in 2014 after he had held the position for less than a year. This was on the basis that Alpha was charging students for services that they could allegedly obtain for free from the students' union, and therefore it would be undesirable for the college to continue its association with him.

== Duty of care during pandemics ==
Sokol has called for the introduction of professional clinical ethicists in British hospitals, argued that doctors have a strong but not absolute duty of care in times of virulent epidemics, and defended the moral permissibility of clinicians deceiving patients in rare circumstances. He highlights the ethical conflict faced by healthcare workers during deadly pandemics, where their duty to care for individuals clashes with their duty to protect their own lives and families.

== History of medicine ==
American professor of infectious diseases, Charles S. Bryan, notes Sokol to have studied and written on medical ethics surrounding Sir William Osler and in his Encyclopaedia of Osler notes that Sokol, writing in the British Medical Journal in 2007, interprets Aequanimitas as an essay that "tackles head-on a timeless question: what makes a good doctor?" In his article William Osler and the jubjub of ethics; or how to teach medical ethics in the 21st century (2007), Sokol notes that Osler's view of ethics centred on personal character and virtues, aiming to form good doctors, teachers, and students through strong moral habits rather than by analysing specific moral problems. He argues that medical ethics education today should follow this example by focusing on real interactions between doctors and patients, supported by ethics discussions on hospital wards, instead of relying mostly on classroom lectures.

== Personal life ==
In his personal life, Sokol is a semi-professional magician. He is married to Samantha, a neurosurgeon.

== Other roles ==
Sokol has been a visiting scholar in bioethics at Washington Hospital Center, Washington, D.C., and Providence St. Vincent Medical Center, Oregon, and has sat on a number of committees, including those of the Ministry of Defence, the Ministry of Justice, and the Royal College of Surgeons of England. He has been a senior editor of the Postgraduate Medical Journal. Since 2020 Sokol has chaired the Metropolitan Police Research Ethics Committee. From 2023 to 2025, he was president of the Osler Club of London.

== Selected publications ==
=== Articles ===
- Sokol, Daniel K. (2005). "Meeting the ethical needs of doctors". British Medical Journal. 330 (7494): 741–742. doi:10.1136/bmj.330.7494.741. ISSN 0959-8138. PMC 555865. PMID 15802701.
- Sokol, Daniel K. (2006). "Virulent Epidemics and Scope of Healthcare Workers' Duty of Care". Emerging Infectious Diseases. 12 (8): 1238–1241. doi:10.3201/eid1208.060360. ISSN 1080-6040. PMC 3291234. PMID 16965703.
- Sokol, Daniel K. (December 2006). "How the doctor's nose has shortened over time; a historical overview of the truth-telling debate in the doctor-patient relationship". Journal of the Royal Society of Medicine. 99 (12): 632–636. doi:10.1177/014107680609901212. ISSN 0141-0768. PMC 1676322. PMID 17139067.
- Sokol, Daniel K. (2007). "Can deceiving patients be morally acceptable?". British Medical Journal. 334 (7601): 984–986. doi:10.1136/bmj.39184.419826.80. ISSN 0959-8138. PMC 1867874. PMID 17494019.
- Sokol, Daniel K. (December 2007). "William Osler and the jubjub of ethics; or how to teach medical ethics in the 21st century". Journal of the Royal Society of Medicine. 100 (12): 544–546. doi:10.1177/0141076807100012010. ISSN 0141-0768. PMC 2121630. PMID 18065704.
- Sokol, Daniel K. (September 2008). "Medicine as performance: what can magicians teach doctors?". Journal of the Royal Society of Medicine. 101 (9): 443–446. doi:10.1258/jrsm.2008.080133. ISSN 1758-1095. PMC 2587378. PMID 18779245.
- Sokol, D. K. (4 March 2009). "Ethics Man. Rethinking ward rounds". British Medical Journal (Clinical Research Ed.). 338: b879. doi:10.1136/bmj.b879. ISSN 1756-1833. PMID 19261674.
- Sokol, D. K. (21 November 2012). "How good a doctor do you need to be?". British Medical Journal (Clinical Research Ed.). 345 e7858. doi:10.1136/bmj.e7858. ISSN 1756-1833. PMID 23172943.
- Sokol, Daniel (2017). "Charlie Gard case: an ethicist in the courtroom". British Medical Journal j3451. doi:10.1136/bmj.j3451. ISSN 0959-8138. S2CID 37219934.

=== Books ===
- Medical Ethics and Law: Surviving on the Wards and Passing Exams. Trauma Publishing. 2005. ISBN 978-0-9547657-1-2. (Co-author)
- Doing Clinical Ethics: A Hands-on Guide for Clinicians and Others. Springer. 2012. ISBN 978-94-007-2783-0.
- Pupillage Inside Out: How to Succeed as a Pupil Barrister. Sweet & Maxwell. 2013. ISBN 978-0-414-02913-2. (Co-author)
- Tough Choices: Stories from the Front Line of Medical Ethics. Book Guild Publishing, Limited. 2018. ISBN 978-1-912575-48-0.
- A Young Person's Guide to Law and Justice. The Book Guild Publishing. 2024. ISBN 978-1-83574-027-9. (Co-author)

== See also ==
- List of presidents of the Osler Club of London

== Bibliography ==
- Bryan, Charles S. (2020). Sir William Osler; An Encyclopaedia. Novato, California: Norman Publishing in association with the American Osler Society. ISBN 978-0-930405-91-5.
