= Charles S. Bryan =

American physician

Charles S. Bryan MD, MACP, FRCP
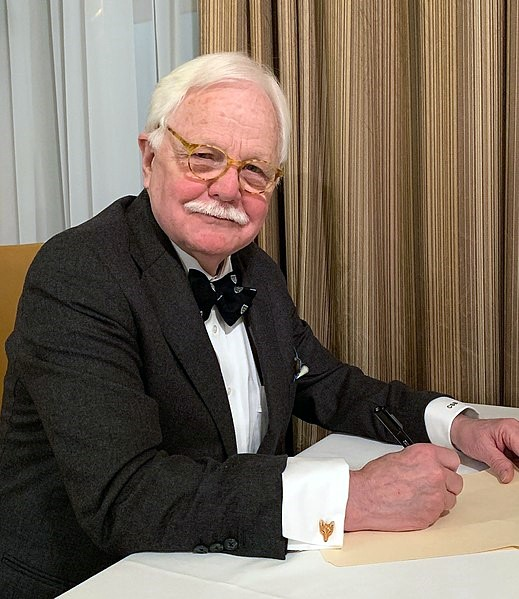
- Bryan, Montreal (2019)
- Born: Charles Stone Bryan; 1942 (age 83–84)
- Education: Harvard College; Johns Hopkins University School of Medicine
- Occupation: Professor of internal medicine
- Known for: Research in infectious diseases; Literary contributions to internal medicine and history of medicine
- Medical career
- Profession: Physician and medical historian
- Institutions: University of South Carolina School of Medicine (UofSC)
- Research: Infectious disease; History of medicine
- Awards: Order of the Palmetto (2013)

Charles Stone Bryan (born 1942) is an American retired infectious disease physician, researcher, author and Heyward Gibbes distinguished professor emeritus of internal medicine at the University of South Carolina School of Medicine (UofSC). His contributions to medicine have included working on a formula for administering the maximum possible dose of penicillin to people with kidney failure which would treat the infection and avoid penicillin toxicity, and treating and writing on HIV/AIDS. He is also a noted medical historian and an authority on the life of William Osler.

He is a Master of the American College of Physicians, and has been president of the South Carolina Infectious Diseases Society, the American Osler Society and the Columbia Medical Society. His awards include the American Osler Society's Lifetime Achievement Award in 2010 and the Order of the Palmetto in 2013.

Bryan's publications include Osler: Inspirations from a Great Physician (1997), Infectious Diseases in Primary Care (2002), and Asylum Doctor; James Woods Babcock and the Red Plague of Pellagra (2014), the result of 15 years of research.

== Early life and education ==
Charles Bryan, known also as "Charley", was born and brought up in Columbia, South Carolina. His father, Leon S. Bryan, was a physician who graduated from the Medical College of South Carolina during the Depression. His mother, Mary Morrill Leadbeater Bryan, was the daughter of John Leadbeater Jr. (1872–1917), one of the last proprietors of the Stabler Leadbeater Apothecary in Alexandria, Virginia. Mary L. Bryan was a founding member of the League of Women Voters chapter in Columbia, South Carolina, and served as president of the South Carolina state chapter of the League of Women Voters from 1961 to 1963.

Charles attended Dreher High School and then Harvard College. At Harvard, he spent some time under sociologist David Riesman and wrote on slavery on a South Carolina rice plantation. This became the start of Bryan's parallel career in medical history.

In 1963, he transferred to the Johns Hopkins University School of Medicine, taking a copy of William Osler's inspirational addresses, Aequanimitas, given to him by his father. Here, he approached historian David Donald and developed his slavery paper into a thesis and during one summer break, he worked on a project on bloodletting under historian Owsei Temkin. In 1966, he received a traveling scholarship in the history of medicine by the University of Kansas. This took him to London where he continued further studies of bloodletting and also visited The Doctor by Luke Fildes at the Tate Gallery.

In 1967 he completed his five years of medical education and received both a BA and MD.

== Career ==
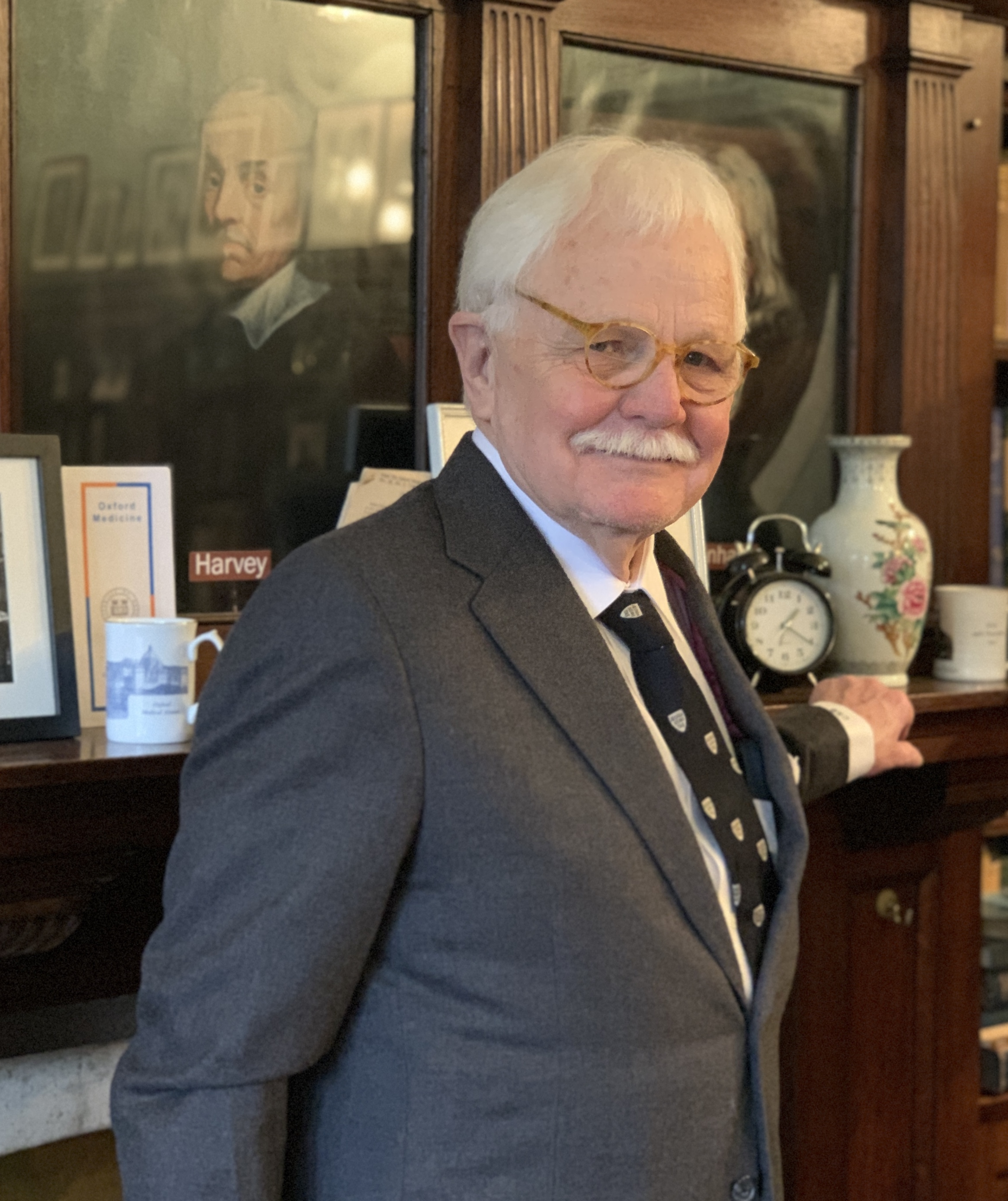
Charles S. Bryan, Norham Gardens, Oxford (2020)

In 1974, he returned to Columbia after completing training at both the Johns Hopkins and the Vanderbilt University Medical Center and then entered private practice in internal medicine and infectious diseases. In 1977, he became a charter faculty member at the UofSC, where he has served as director of the Division of Infectious Diseases between 1977 and 1993, chair of the Department of Medicine between 1992 and 2000, and director of the Center for bioethics and medical humanities from 2000.

In the early 1970s, Bryan and nephrologist Bill Stone worked out a formula for administering the maximum possible dose of penicillin to a person in kidney failure which would treat the infection while avoiding penicillin toxicity.

He served as a hospital epidemiologist at a number of hospitals in the Columbia area. For the care of patients with HIV/AIDS, a disease Bryan has treated and written on and stressed the importance of understanding the social and historical context of, he was the principal founder of the Midlands Care Consortium in South Carolina. He also contributed to South Carolina's early response to the HIV/AIDS epidemic.

In 2020, he published Sir William Osler: An Encyclopedia, which included contributions from 135 authors.

== Honors and awards ==
Bryan is a master of the American College of Physicians, a fellow of the Royal College of Physicians of Edinburgh and Royal College of Physicians, London, a fellow the Infectious Diseases Society of America, a co-founder and past president of the South Carolina Infectious Diseases Society, and a past president of the Columbia Medical Society and of the Waring Library Society. He is a member of a number of medical organizations including the American Clinical and Climatological Association, the National Foundation for Infectious Diseases and the American Osler Society, of which he is a past president.

Bryan is the recipient of a number of awards including;

- Logan Clendening traveling fellowship in the history of medicine, University of Kansas (1967).
- William Osler Medal from the American Association for the History of Medicine (1967).
- Theodore E. Woodward Award from the American Clinical and Climatological Association (2002).
- Laureate Award, Nicholas E. Davies Memorial Scholar Award and Centennial Legacy Award, all of the American College of Physicians.
- President's Award of the South Carolina Medical Association.
- Lifetime Achievement Award from the American Osler Society in 2010

In April 2012, Bryan was inducted into the Society of St. Luke at Providence Hospital, Columbia. In 2013 he received the Order of the Palmetto.

The Association of Professors of Medicine created the Charles S. Bryan Dinner in recognition of his contributions to that organization. In 2002, a portrait of Bryan was completed by artist Tarleton Blackwell. It was based on a photograph taken in 1994, in Osler's study at 13 Norham Gardens, Oxford. In 2003, the Charles S. Bryan History of Medicine Room at the University of South Carolina was named in his honor, and the same institution also created the Charles S. Bryan Scholar Award to recognize each year an outstanding internal medicine resident. In 2017, the South Carolina chapter of the American College of Physicians created the Charles S. Bryan Lecture in the Humanities.

== Personal and family ==
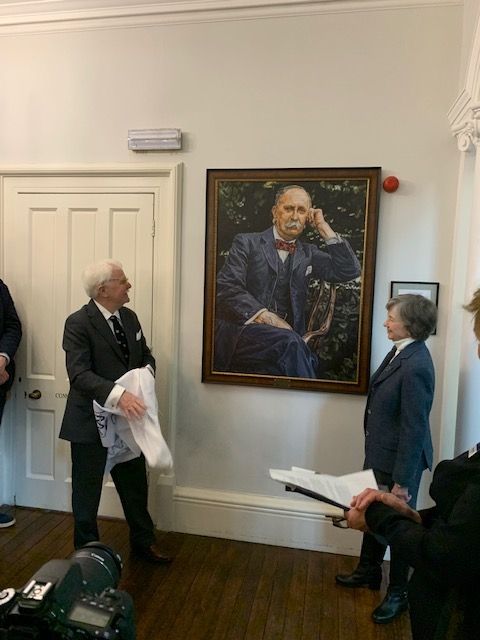
Unveiling of portrait of Sir William Osler by Charles S. Bryan and his wife Donna. Taken in Oxford, 2020

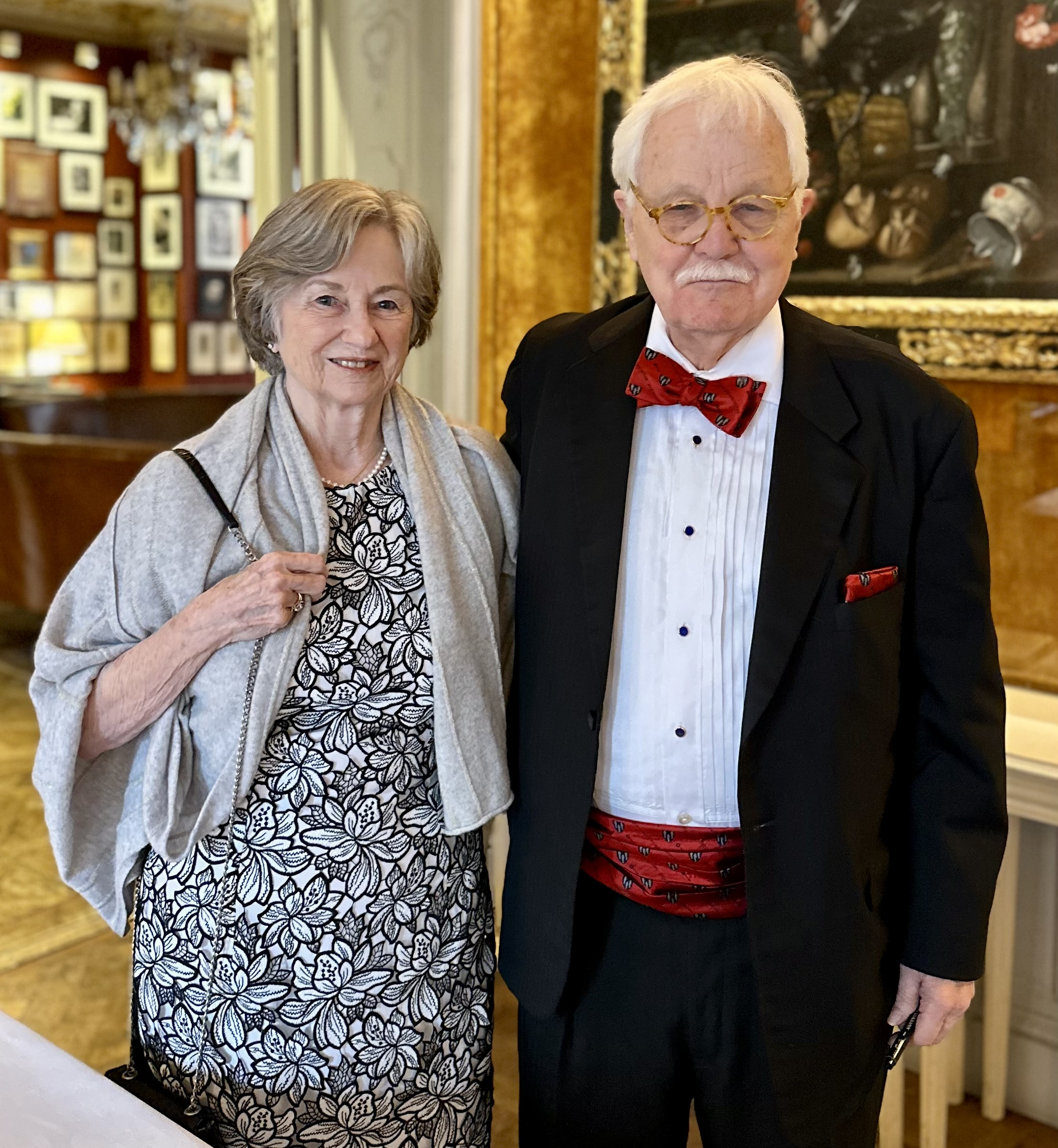
C. S. Bryan and wife Donna, London (2023)

Bryan is married to the former Donna Hennessee, who founded the Seeds of Hope Farmers Market Project in South Carolina.

== Selected publications ==
Bryan has authored a number of works on the pharmacology of antibiotics, bloodstream infections, and hospital-acquired infections as well as on the history of medicine, particularly relating to Sir William Osler, on whom he is considered an authority. He has made over 500 contributions to medical literature including writing 12 books. In 2020, he led the creation of William Osler: An Encyclopedia.

=== Books ===
- Osler: Inspirations from a Great Physician, Oxford University Press, 1997. ISBN 9780195112511
- Infectious Diseases in Primary Care, W. B. Saunders Company, 2002. ISBN 9780721690568
- The Quotable Osler, co-authored with Mark E. Silverman and T. J. Murray, American College of Physicians, 2008. ISBN 9781934465004
- Asylum Doctor; James Woods Babcock and the Red Plague of Pellagra, Waring Historical Library, Medical University of South Carolina, 2014. ISBN 978-1-61117-490-8 Details mental illness and pellagra in South Carolina. In 2015, it was described as "probably his most ambitious undertaking, requiring as it did 15 years of painstaking research".
- Sir William Osler: an encyclopedia. Novato, California: Norman Publishing. 2020. ISBN 978-0-930405-91-5. OCLC 1151926858.

=== Editor ===
Between 1977 and 2012, he was editor of the Journal of the South Carolina Medical Association and in addition he has reviewed for a number of other medical journals, including Infection Control & Hospital Epidemiology.

=== Articles ===
He has authored a landmark article on the overprescribing of antibiotics.

- Bryan, Charles S.; Stone, W. J. (1975). ""Comparably Massive" Penicillin G Therapy in Renal Failure". Annals of Internal Medicine. 82 (2): 189–95. doi:10.7326/0003-4819-82-2-189. PMID 1115440.
- "Analysis of 1,186 episodes of gram-negative bacteremia in non-university hospitals: the effects of antimicrobial therapy", Clinical Infectious Diseases, 1 July 1983; 5: 629–638. Co-authored with Kenneth L. Reynolds and Eric R. Brenner
- Bryan, C. S. (1989). "Strategies to improve antibiotic use". Infectious Disease Clinics of North America. 3 (4): 723–34. doi:10.1016/S0891-5520(20)30304-4. PMID 2687360.
- "Fever, Famine, and War: William Osler as an Infectious Diseases Specialist", Clinical Infectious Diseases, Vol. 23, No. 5 (Nov., 1996), pp. 1139-1149.
- "Penicillin Dosing for Pneumococcal Pneumonia, co-authored with Rohit Talwani and M. Shawn Stinson, Chest, December 1997, pp. 1657-1664
- Bryan, Charles S. (1994). "What is the Oslerian tradition?". Annals of Internal Medicine. 120 (8): 682–7. doi:10.7326/0003-4819-120-8-199404150-00010. PMID 8135454. S2CID 42878390.
- Bryan, Charles S. (1999). "Treatment of pneumococcal pneumonia: the case for penicillin G". The American Journal of Medicine. 107 (1A): 63–68. doi:10.1016/S0002-9343(99)00099-6. PMID 10451011.
- Bryan, Charles S. (2015). "Osler redux: the American College of Physicians at 100". The Lancet. 385 (9979): 1720–1. doi:10.1016/S0140-6736(15)60881-9. PMID 25943928. S2CID 35770145.
