= Academy of Neonatal Nursing =

US professional organization

- Abbreviation: ANN
- Formation: 2001
- Type: Professional organization
- Purpose: Professional and neonatal nursing education
- Headquarters: 1425 N. McDowell Blvd., Suite 105
- Location: Petaluma, California 94954
- Region served: Worldwide
- Members: Neonatal nurses
- Official language: English
- Main organ: Executive committee
- Website: www.academyonline.org

== Founder ==
Charles Rait is the founder of Neonatal Network (1981) and the National Association of Neonatal Nurse (1984). He is the originator of the Academy of Neonatal Nursing (2001). He also has done hundreds or educational conferences and learning programs sponsored through these organizations.

== History ==
The Academy of Neonatal Nursing (ANN) is a professional organization in the United States for neonatal nurses. It was established on February 6, 2001 and has approximately 6,000 members. The organization is supporter of the Foundation for Neonatal Research and Education (FNRE).

== Mission ==
The mission of the Academy of Neonatal Nursing is to provide neonatal education and programs to health care professionals caring for neonatal and their families.

== Activities ==
The mission is achieved through professional, peer-reviewed publications (Neonatal Network: The Journal of Neonatal Nursing), educational conferences, and offering books and other materials to neonatal health care professionals.

== Executive committee ==
ANN is governed by an Executive Committee. Members of this committee are:

- Debbie Fraser,
- Julieanne Schiefelbein,
- Denise L. Zimmerman,
- Tina Scott,
- AnnMarie Barber,
- Karen D'Apolito,
- Sean G. Smith,

== Publications ==
ANN's primary publication is Neonatal Network: The Journal of Neonatal Nursing, published bimonthly. It has approximately 10,000 subscribers, including over 1,000 American neonatal intensive care units (NICUs). The peer-reviewed journal was established in 1981 and publishes articles on clinical practice, research and nursing education.

== Continuing education ==
ANN is an accredited source for continuing education in nursing in the US. It runs three educational conferences per year: one for advanced-practice neonatal nurses, one for neonatal nurses in general, and one for mother-baby nurses. ANN also supports nursing research and education through the Foundation for Neonatal Research and Education.
