= National Association of Neonatal Nurses =

U.S. professional organization

- km
- Abbreviation: NANN
- Formation: 1984
- Type: Professional organization
- Purpose: Scientific, Educational
- Headquarters: Chicago, IL
- Website: www.nann.org

The National Association of Neonatal Nurses (NANN) is a professional organization for neonatal nurses in the United States. NANN was founded in 1984 by five neonatal nurses: Patricia Johnson, Linda Bellig, Tracy Karp, Charles Rait and Donna Lee Loper. Within one year, the association boasted a membership of 3,790.

== Mission ==
The mission of the National Association of Neonatal Nurses is to address the educational and practice needs within the evolving specialty of neonatal nursing, while giving all neonatal nurses national representation.

This mission is achieved through professional, peer-reviewed publications (Advances in Neonatal Care), educational conferences, and offering books and other materials to neonatal health care professionals.

== Legislation ==
NANN supported the Newborn Screening Saves Lives Reauthorization Act of 2013 (H.R. 1281; 113th Congress), a bill that would amend the Public Health Service Act to reauthorize grant programs and other initiatives to promote expanded screening of newborns and children for heritable disorders.
