= W. Bruce Fye =

American physician (born 1946)

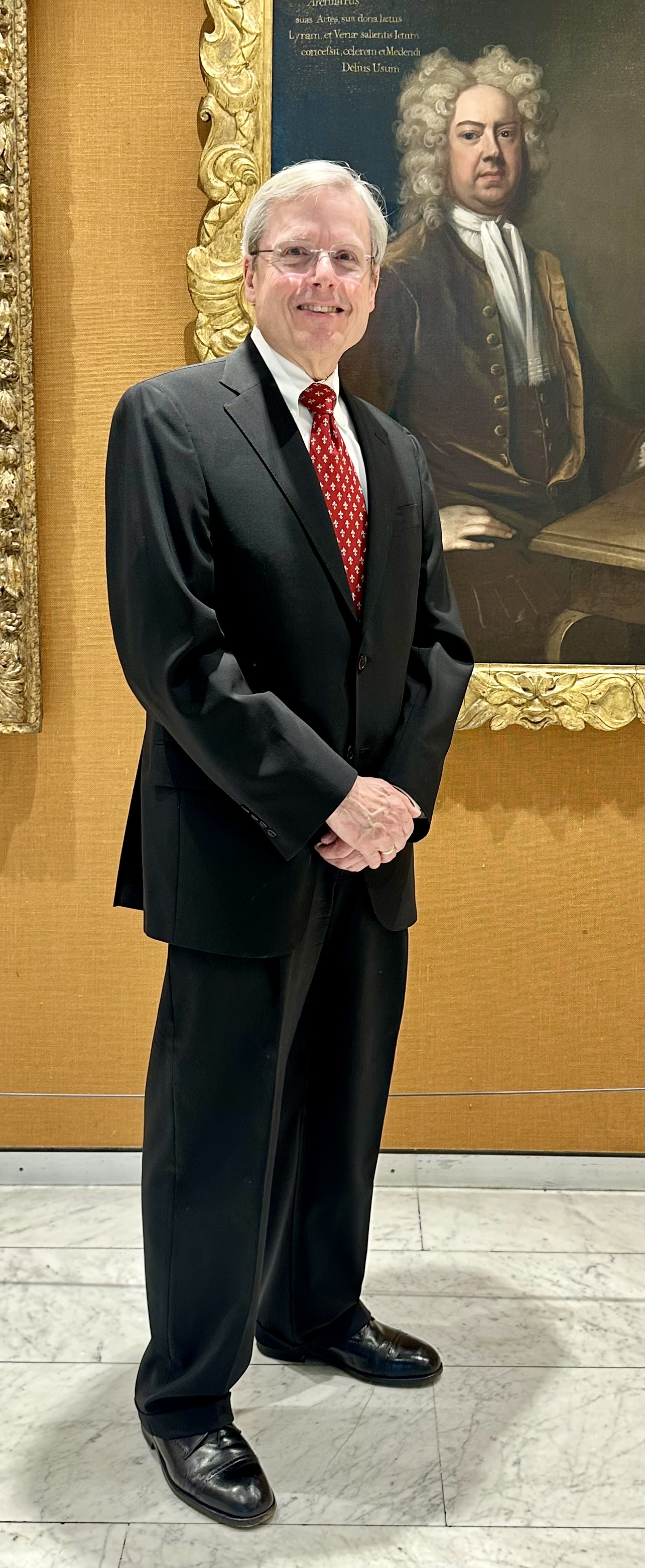
- W. Bruce Fye, (Royal College of Physicians, 2023)
- Born: Wallace Bruce Fye; 1946 (age 79–80); Meadville, Pennsylvania, United States
- Education: Johns Hopkins University
- Occupations: Cardiologist; Medical historian
- Known for: Bibliophilia; Philanthropy; W. Bruce Fye Center for the History of Medicine
- Medical career
- Profession: Physician
- Institutions: St. Joseph’s Hospital in Marshfield; New York-Presbyterian Weill Cornell Medical Center; Johns Hopkins University; Mayo Clinic
- Notable works: The Development of American Physiology: Scientific Medicine in the Nineteenth Century (1987); American Cardiology: The History of a Specialty and its College (1996); "Profiles in Cardiology" series; Caring for the Heart (2015)
- Awards: William H. Welch Medal (2000); American Osler Society’s Lifetime Achievement Award (2009); Albert Nelson Marquis Lifetime Achievement Award (2018); Genevieve Miller Lifetime Achievement Award (2022)

Wallace Bruce Fye (born 1946) is an American retired cardiologist, medical historian, writer, bibliophile and philanthropist. He is emeritus professor of medicine and the history of medicine at the Mayo Clinic, Rochester, Minnesota, and was the founding director of the institution's W. Bruce Fye Center for the History of Medicine.

Fye was born in Meadville, Pennsylvania, and grew up in the suburbs of Philadelphia. A collector from a young age, he developed an interest in old books, and following qualifications in both medicine and history of medicine from the Johns Hopkins University, he pursued a dual career in cardiology and medical history, where his particular interests have included 19th century professionalization of physiology, American medical education in the 19th and 20th centuries, and the history of cardiology, specialization, and the Mayo Clinic.

In 1978, he was both elected a Fellow of the American College of Cardiology (ACC) and appointed to the Marshfield Clinic in Wisconsin, where he was chair of its Cardiology Department until 1999 and where he established the echocardiography laboratory. Fye's appointments have also included vice-chief of staff of St. Joseph's Hospital in Marshfield, governor of the ACC's Wisconsin chapter and head of cardiology at Marshfield Clinic. He has been a president of the American College of Cardiology, the American Association for the History of Medicine, and the American Osler Society.

Fye is the sole author of more than 100 articles. In 1987, he published his first book The Development of American Physiology: Scientific Medicine in the Nineteenth Century. He contributed more than 50 biographical sketches to the "Profiles in Cardiology" series in the journal Clinical Cardiology. These were reprinted in a book titled Profiles in Cardiology which was co-edited with J. Willis Hurst and C. Richard Conti. Other noted publications have included his 2006 article titled "Troponin trumps common sense" and “Women Cardiologists: Why so few?”

In 2014, when Fye retired from Mayo Clinic, he became emeritus professor of medicine and the history of medicine. he later donated many of the books and papers he had collected over the previous 50 years to the Mayo Clinic, the Huntington Library, San Marino, California, and the Alan Mason Chesney Archives of the Johns Hopkins Medical Institutions, Baltimore, Maryland.

== Early life and education ==
W. Bruce Fye was born in 1946 in Meadville, Pennsylvania, and grew up in the suburbs of Philadelphia. He was the only child of a banker and his childhood hobbies revolved around collecting, that included stamps, coins, and baseball cards. By the age of 14, he had developed an interest for old books, later described "as an advanced case of bibliomania", and by the tenth grade, he decided to become a doctor.

Fye received his undergraduate and medical degrees, BA (1968) and MD (1972) from Johns Hopkins University, where he was elected to four national honour societies: Delta Phi Alpha, Alpha Epsilon Delta, Phi Beta Kappa and Alpha Omega Alpha. He completed his internal medicine residency at New York Hospital-Cornell Medical Center [now the New York-Presbyterian Weill Cornell Medical Center] in Manhattan, before returning to Johns Hopkins in 1975 for his cardiology fellowship. During his tenure as a Robert Wood Johnson Clinical Scholar at Hopkins, he completed his cardiology training and received an MA degree in 1978 from the Institute of the History of Medicine.

== Career ==
=== Marshfield Clinic ===
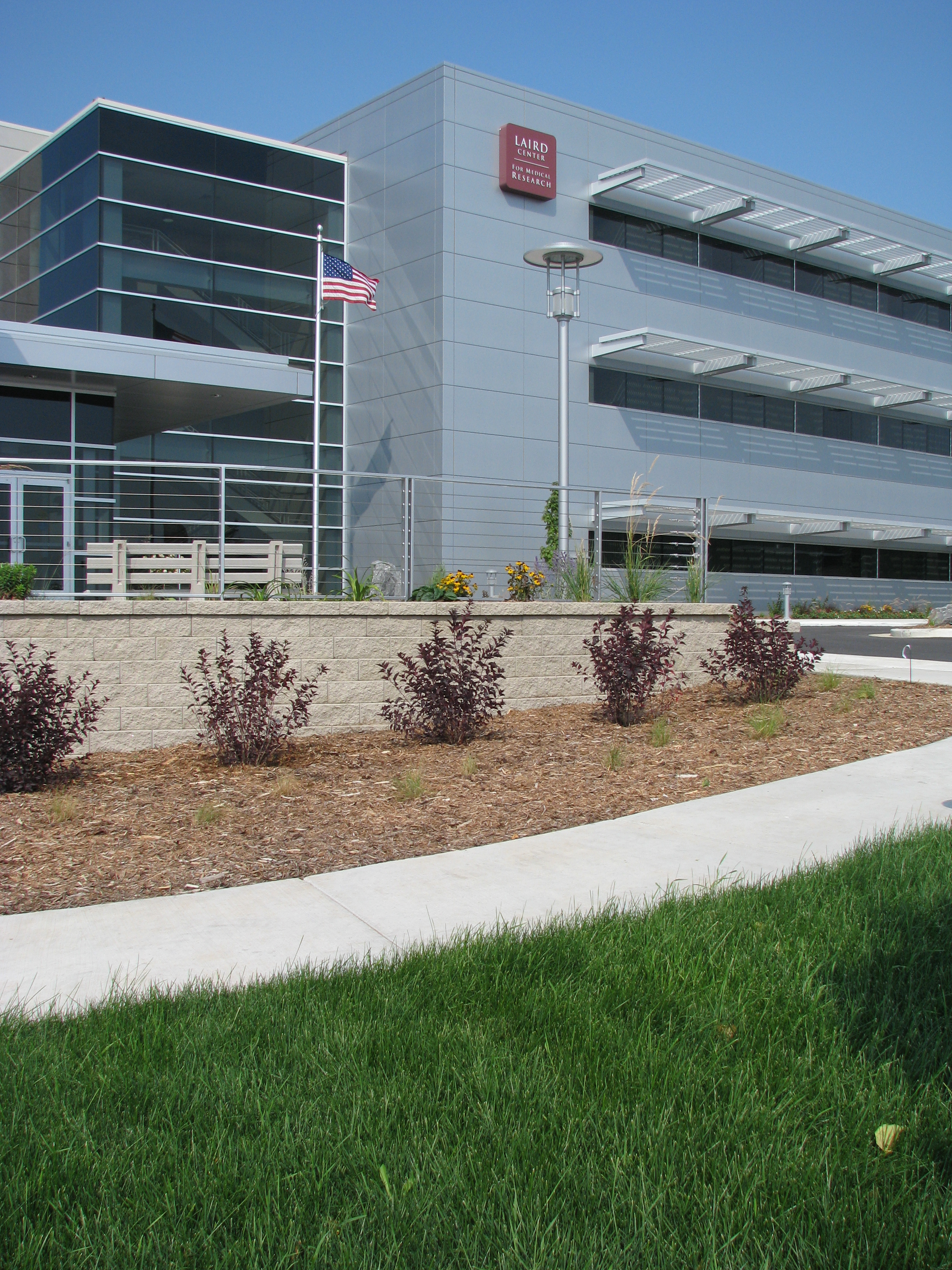
Marshfield Clinic

In 1978, Fye was elected a fellow of the American College of Cardiology (ACC) and in the same year joined the Marshfield Clinic in Wisconsin, where he founded the echocardiography laboratory. He served as chair of Marshfield's Cardiology Department from 1981 through 1999, having been elected to nine two-year terms.

In addition to a number of committee appointments at the Marshfield Clinic, Fye was vice-chief of staff of St. Joseph's Hospital in Marshfield from 1989 to 1999.

Between 1993 and 1996, he was governor of the ACC's Wisconsin chapter (1993–1996) and chaired the organization's Government Relations Committee.

As head of cardiology at Marshfield Clinic, Fye established a taskforce on workforce and co-chaired the 35th Bethesda Conference: Cardiology's Workforce Crisis: A Pragmatic Approach. He endeavoured, with resistance, to recruit cardiologists and produce studies on the workforce in cardiology. One of his monthly editorials titled “Women Cardiologists: Why so few?” discussed the masculine image of cardiology and the problems with work-life balance.

=== Mayo Clinic ===
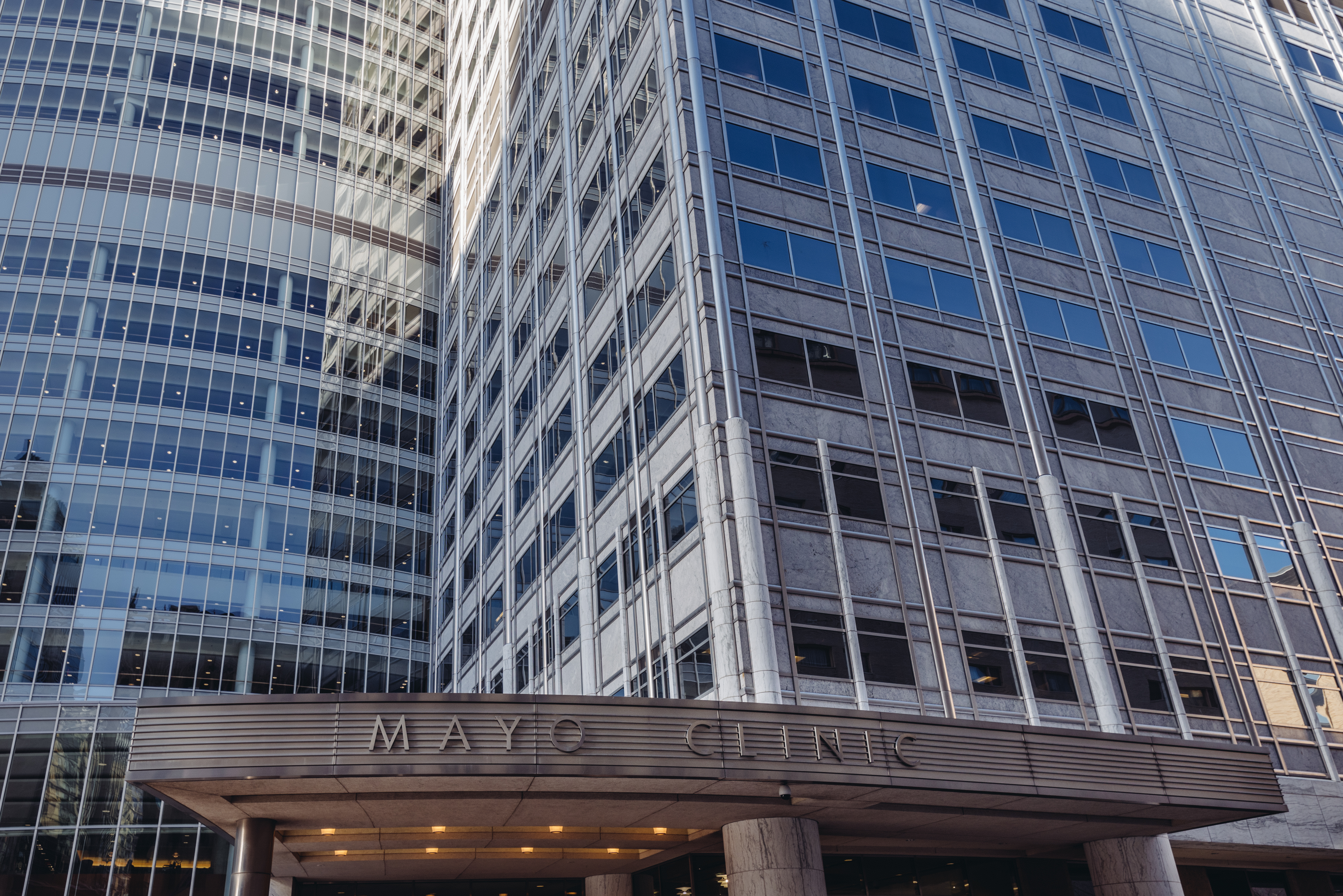
Mayo Clinic Building in Rochester, Minnesota

In 2001, Fye moved to Rochester, Minnesota to join the Mayo Clinic. At the Mayo Clinic his clinical responsibilities centered on echocardiography and the care of patients with heart valve disease. In 2005 he was selected as the founding director of the Mayo Clinic Center for the History of Medicine.

=== Profiles in cardiology ===
In 2003, with J. W. Hurst and C. R. Conti, he published Profiles in Cardiology: A Collection of Profiles Featuring Individuals Who Have Made Significant Contributions to the Study of Cardiovascular Disease. Fye contributed more than fifty biographical sketches to the "Profiles in Cardiology" series in the journal Clinical Cardiology. These were reprinted in a book titled Profiles in Cardiology which was co-edited with J. Willis Hurst and C. Richard Conti and published by Mahwah, NJ: Foundation for Advances in Medicine and Science (2003).

=== American College of Cardiology ===
During his tenure as president of the ACC, between 2002 and 2003, Fye tackled some of the effects of Clinton health care plan of 1993, which had highlighted the high number of specialists and a need for generalists, with the result that between 1994 and 2000, fellowship appointments fell by nearly a third. He stated in an interview that;

managed care had a “gatekeeper” model, which prevented patients from seeing a cardiologist unless a primary care physician had signed off. Accordingly, competition in cardiology increased.

In 2006, his essay "Troponin trumps common sense", which discussed the appropriate use of the troponin test, drew the attention of a number of cardiology colleagues. In a reply, he stated "rather than allowing troponin to trump common sense, we should inject more common sense into the process of ordering a troponin level in the first place".

He also worked on the origins of the Mayo Clinic and authored a book titled The Mayo Clinic and Cardiology: Specialization in the Twentieth Century.

== History of medicine ==
Fye's interest in medical history developed out of his efforts in collecting books, which began in 1961. By the end of the decade he had begun to focus on acquiring old medical books. In 1973, during his medical training in New York City, he launched a mail order book business, W. Bruce Fye Antiquarian Medical Books. He coordinated a luncheon symposium on collecting medical books at the 1977 meeting of the American Association for the History of Medicine and published his first article on the subject two years later.

His particular interests in the history of medicine have included 19th century professionalization of physiology, the American medical education in the 19th and 20th centuries, and the history of cardiology, specialization, and the Mayo Clinic.

In 1987, Fye published his first book based on his MA thesis at Johns Hopkins, The Development of American Physiology: Scientific Medicine in the Nineteenth Century (Johns Hopkins University Press). Of a number of reviews, historian Philip Pauly wrote,

Fye outlines the emergence of the discipline of physiology in American within the framework of a late nineteenth century medical reform movement. The book is important for reasserting the central importance of experimental science in the social transformation of American medicine.

He was the founding director of the Mayo Clinic's W. Bruce Fye Center for the History of Medicine, named by the Mayo Clinic in his honour as a result of his philanthropy.

In addition to building up a large collection of books, offprints, and autographs relating to the history of cardiology, Fye has been a collector of prints and engravings relating to medicine and engraved portraits of physicians. He curated two exhibitions of prints drawn from his collection: Medicine and Art (Marshfield, WI, New Visions Gallery, 1996) and Five Hundred Years of Medicine in Art from the Collection of Bruce and Lois Fye (Rochester, MN, Rochester Art Center, 2010). That exhibition was held in conjunction with the annual meetings of the American Osler Society and the American Association for the History of Medicine.

Fye was editor-in-chief of the Classics of Cardiology Library, which produced facsimile reprints of books of significance in the history of cardiology and cardiac surgery. The series was launched with an original volume William Osler's Collected Papers on the Cardiovascular System, which Fye edited.

In 2014, when Fye retired from Mayo Clinic, he became emeritus professor of medicine and the history of medicine. The following year he published Caring for the Heart: Mayo Clinic and the Rise of Specialization, where his “goal was to write a book that explained how and why the care of patients with heart disease changes so dramatically during the twentieth century”. Surgeon and historian Justin Barr wrote in his review;

Caring for the Heart weaves together the history of the Mayo Clinic, the history of cardiology, and the history of specialization, into a single account, pulling the strengths from each element to help dissect, explain, and historicize the others. In so doing, Fye has created a highly readable story of modern medicine in twentieth-century America, meeting the challenge of appealing to professional historians, clinicians, and interested public alike.

Based on his research and publications about the history of the Mayo Clinic, Fye functioned as Senior Historical Consultant for the two-hour Ken Burns film The Mayo Clinic: Faith, Hope, Science, which premiered on PBS on 25 September 25, 2018.

In 2016, he donated many of the books he had collected over the previous 50 years to the Mayo Clinic. In 2021, Fye arranged to donate his private papers to the Alan Mason Chesney Archives of the Johns Hopkins Medical Institutions, Baltimore, Maryland, and donated what was believed to be the largest private collection of books and other materials related to the history of cardiology to the Huntington Library, San Marino, California.

== Personal and family ==
Fye met Lois Baker in high school in Bucks County, Pennsylvania, and they married whilst he was a medical student and she was a nurse at Johns Hopkins. They have two daughters, Katherine and Elizabeth.

== Awards ==
- 2000: William H. Welch Medal, for his book American Cardiology: The History of a Specialty and its College (Johns Hopkins University Press, 1996).
- 2003: Designated 'Master of the American College of Cardiology'.
- 2005: One of 15 individuals inducted into the 'Johns Hopkins University Society of Scholars'.
- 2009: Fifth recipient of the American Osler Society’s Lifetime Achievement Award.
- 2015: Named “Newsmaker of the Year in the Health Field” Rochester Post-Bulletin
- 2018: Chosen for the Archivists and Librarians in the History of the Health Sciences (ALHHS) Recognition of Merit
- 2018: Recipient of Albert Nelson Marquis Lifetime Achievement Award
- 2022: Genevieve Miller Lifetime Achievement Award from the American Association for the History of Medicine.

== Selected publications ==
PubMed lists Fye as the sole author of more than 100 articles.

=== Articles ===
- Fye, W. B. (December 1979). "Collecting medical books: practical and theoretical considerations with an annotated bibliography". Transactions & Studies of the College of Physicians of Philadelphia. 1 (4): 305–23. PMID 400268.
- Bruce Fye, W. (April 2003). "The power of clinical trials and guidelines, and the challenge of conflicts of interest". Journal of the American College of Cardiology. 41 (8): 1237–1242. doi:10.1016/s0735-1097(03)00232-8. PMID 12706915.
- Fye, W.Bruce (July 2004). "Introduction: the origins and implications of a growing shortage of cardiologists". Journal of the American College of Cardiology. 44 (2): 221–232. doi:10.1016/j.jacc.2004.05.019. PMID 15261909.
- Fye, W. Bruce (December 2006). "Troponin Trumps Common Sense". Journal of the American College of Cardiology. 48 (11): 2357–2358. doi:10.1016/j.jacc.2006.10.014. PMID 17161278.
- W. Bruce Fye (2010). "Presidential Address: The Origins and Evolution of the Mayo Clinic from 1864 to 1939: A Minnesota Family Practice Becomes an International "Medical Mecca"". Bulletin of the History of Medicine. 84 (3): 323–357. doi:10.1353/bhm.2010.0019. PMID 21037395. S2CID 44839983.

=== Books ===
- William Osler’s Collected Papers on the Cardiovascular System. Birmingham and New York (1985). Gryphon Editions. The Classics of Cardiology Library
- The Development of American Physiology: Scientific Medicine in the Nineteenth Century. Baltimore: Johns Hopkins University Press (1987). ISBN 0-8018-3459-7
- American Cardiology: The History of a Specialty and Its College. Baltimore: Johns Hopkins University Press (1996). ISBN 0-8018-5292-7
- Profiles in Cardiology: A collection of profiles featuring individuals who have made significant contributions to the study of cardiovascular disease. Co-authored with J. W. Hurst and C. R. Conti, Foundation for Advances in Medicine and Science (2003). ISBN 978-0615120843
- J. Willis Hurst: His Life and Teachings. Co-authored with Silverman. M. E., Mahwah, NJ. (2007). Foundation for Advances in Medicine and Science. ISBN 978-0-615-13546-5
- Caring for the Heart: Mayo Clinic and the Rise of Specialization. New York: Oxford University Press (2015). ISBN 978-0-19-998235-6; chapter titles with abstracts for each chapter
