= Monica McLemore =

American nurse and academic researcher

Monica Rose McLemore
- Born: 1969 (age 56–57)
- Education: University of California, San Francisco
- Scientific career
- Workplaces: University of California, San Francisco; The College of New Jersey; San Francisco State University
- Thesis: An evaluation of the molecular species of CA125 across the three phases of the menstrual cycle. (2010)

Monica Rose McLemore (born 1969) is an American nurse who is an associate professor of Family Health Nursing at the University of California, San Francisco. Her work considers reproductive justice and medical care for marginalised communities, with an overarching aim to eliminate healthcare inequalities. During the COVID-19 pandemic, McLemore studied the impact of coronavirus disease during pregnancy.

== Early life and education ==
McLemore was born as a preemie (pre-term birth). She had no medical members of her family, but decided to become a nurse when she was eight years old. She studied nursing at The College of New Jersey. She earned a Master of Public Health at San Francisco State University. McLemore moved to the University of California, San Francisco for her graduate studies, where she studied CA-125; an antigen that is associated with tumours.

== Research and career ==
McLemore studies the relationship between physical and mental health in low-income communities of colour. Her research makes use of reproductive justice theory; which argues that people who become pregnant have the right to decide how they want the birth to be. Rooted in reproductive justice theory, McLemore launched the Saving Our Ladies from early births And Reducing Stress (SOLARS) study, which looks to understand the impact of stress, anxiety and racism on gestational duration in Black and Latina communities.

McLemore was part of the preterm birth initiative (PTBi-California), which looks to understand why preterm births mainly occur in low-income women of colour. PTBi-California looks to mitigate for the disproportionate impact that preterm births have on already marginalised communities; and to work with physicians and educators to deserve programmes that better support these communities.

In 2020 McLemore retired from her clinical nursing career to focus entirely on research with a focus on Black maternal health. During the COVID-19 pandemic, McLemore studied the impact of coronavirus disease during pregnancy, and why Black Americans were hardest hit by the disease. In an article for Scientific American, she argued that the coronavirus disease was not an excuse to abandon pregnant women.

== Awards and honours ==
- 2015 American College of Nurse Midwives Teaching Award
- 2015 Speaking Race to Power Fellow
- 2018 Abortion Care Network Person of the Year
- 2019 Fellow of the American Academy of Nursing
- 2019 Excellence in Leadership Association of Women's Health, Obstetric and Neonatal Nurses
- 2020 UCSF Campaign Alumni Award

== Selected publications ==
- McLemore, Monica R. (2006-10-01). "Gardasil®: Introducing the New Human Papillomavirus Vaccine". Clinical Journal of Oncology Nursing. 10 (5): 559–560. doi:10.1188/06.cjon.559-560 (inactive 12 July 2025). ISSN 1092-1095. PMID 17063609.
- McLemore, Monica (2009). "Epidemiological and Genetic Factors Associated With Ovarian Cancer". Cancer Nursing. 32 (4): 289–290. doi:10.1097/ncc.0b013e3181adb252. ISSN 0162-220X. PMC 2891150. PMID 19444085.
- McLemore, Monica R.; Desai, Sheila; Freedman, Lori; James, Evelyn Angel; Taylor, Diana (2014). "Women Know Best—Findings from a Thematic Analysis of 5,214 Surveys of Abortion Care Experience". Women's Health Issues. 24 (6): 594–599. doi:10.1016/j.whi.2014.07.001. ISSN 1049-3867. PMID 25442704. S2CID 8087465.

McLemore has written for Vice, San Francisco Chronicle and Scientific American.
