= Journal of Obstetric, Gynecologic, & Neonatal Nursing =

- Discipline: Nursing, Obstetrics and gynecology, Women's health, and Neonatology
- Language: English
- Edited by: Joyce K. Edmonds

Publication details
- History: 1972-present
- Publisher: Elsevier on behalf of the Association of Women's Health, Obstetric and Neonatal Nurses
- Frequency: Bimonthly

Standard abbreviations
- ISO 4: J. Obstet. Gynecol. Neonatal Nurs.

Indexing
- ISSN: 0884-2175 (print); 1552-6909 (web)
- LCCN: 85644507
- OCLC no.: 11738525

Links
- Journal homepage

The Journal of Obstetric, Gynecologic, & Neonatal Nursing is a peer-reviewed nursing journal in the fields of obstetric nursing, women's health nursing, and neonatal nursing. It is the official scientific publication of the Association of Women's Health, Obstetric and Neonatal Nurses.

== Aims and Scope ==
Scholarship for the Care of Women, Childbearing Families & Newborns

JOGNN is the scientific journal of the Association of Women's Health, Obstetric and Neonatal Nurses. The mission of JOGNN is to advance the health and health care of women, childbearing and childrearing families, and newborns across all settings through the bimonthly publication of peer-reviewed nursing and interdisciplinary scholarship.

JOGNN leads the development of nursing knowledge in the specialties of women's health care; prenatal, intrapartum, and postpartum care; and neonatal care by publishing articles on related aspects of nursing and interdisciplinary research, practice, and policy. Articles published in JOGNN promote diversity, equity, and inclusion and contribute to the emotional, psychological, and physical well-being of women and others throughout the lifespan, their infants, and their families at the individual, community, and population levels. Articles may focus on innovative or novel approaches to the provision of health care, global and international perspectives with applicability to practice in North America, health equity and social determinants of health, health promotion and disease prevention, evidence-based quality improvement, and health policy.

The target audience of JOGNN is nurses, midwives, advanced practice nurses, other providers, and related professionals. Therefore, articles have clear implications for practice, research, and/or policy and contribute to the evidence base for the provision and development of care beyond the study setting. Article types include original research, reviews, health care improvement and evaluation, principles and practice, critical commentary, methods, and case reports.
