= Mark E. Silverman =

American cardiologist (1939–2008)

Mark Edwin Silverman FRCP FACC
- Born: June 21, 1939; Springfield, Ohio, US
- Died: November 12, 2008 (aged 69)
- Occupation: Physician
- Known for: Founding cardiology program at Piedmont Hospital; President of the American Osler Society (2000-2001); medical photography
- Medical career
- Profession: Cardiologist; Medical historian
- Institutions: Piedmont Hospital
- Sub-specialties: Cardiology

Mark Edwin Silverman (June 21, 1939 – November 12, 2008) was an American cardiologist, medical historian, medical educator and author of more than 200 medical articles and a number of books, who founded the cardiology program at Piedmont Hospital in Atlanta, Georgia.

Between 1966 and 1968, at the request of John Willis Hurst, he became a cardiology fellow at the Emory University in Atlanta. His interest in medical photographs led him to produce more than 24 articles on the value of images in the diagnosis of a number of diseases. In 1968, he co-authored an article with Hurst, titled The Hand and the Heart, illustrated with clinical pictures of findings in the hands of people with cardiovascular disease. They demonstrated, using a "Sherlock Holmesian approach", how the condition of the heart might be revealed by clues in the hands. The article made international headlines.

In 1970, a faculty position at Piedmont Hospital was created for him by Hurst, and Silverman subsequently established its first cardiology program. Eight years later, he was made professor at Emory. At Piedmont, he also created one of America's earliest patient education libraries, started programs to help people learn about heart disease and its prevention, and for over 25 years directed Piedmont's coronary care unit.

He made significant contributions to a number of books including British Cardiology in the 20th Century (2000), a collection of 867 quotations by Sir William Osler in The Quotable Osler (2002) and J. Willis Hurst: His Life and Teachings (2007).

In 1979, Silverman became president of the Georgia Chapter of the American Heart Association. In 2000, he was elected president of the American Osler Society, and in 2001 his work in British medical history was rewarded with a fellowship of the Royal Society of Medicine. The Mark E. Silverman Endowed Chair in Cardiology and Education was established in his name.

== Early life and education ==
Mark Silverman was born on June 21, 1939, in Springfield, Ohio. His father was a grocer. In 1959, he graduated from Ohio State University and then gained admission to the School of Medicine at the University of Chicago. In between his junior and senior years at medical school, during one summer, he attended Guy's Hospital in London, where he became interested in both clinical signs and the history of medicine. He received his MD in 1963 and returned to Ohio State to complete his internship and residency. Here, he was inspired to pursue a career in the specialty of cardiology by cardiac catheterisation pioneer James V. Warren and academic cardiologist John Willis Hurst, who was a visiting professor at Ohio State and the chief of medicine at Emory University in Atlanta.

== Career ==
=== Emory University Hospital ===
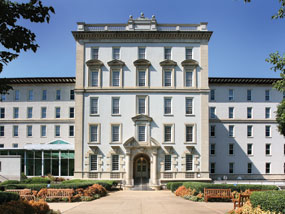
Emory University Hospital Front Entrance

Silverman became interested in medical photography and produced a collection which drove him to publish more than 24 articles on the value of images in the diagnosis of a number of diseases. Between 1966 and 1968, at the request of Hurst, he became a cardiology fellow at the Emory University in Atlanta.

In 1968, he wrote two articles with Hurst, one called "The mitral complex: Interaction of the anatomy, physiology, and pathology of the mitral annulus, mitral valve leaflets, chordae tendineae, and papillary muscles" and the other titled "The Hand and the Heart", a topic Silverman also presented to the Laennec Society of the American Heart Association. The article was illustrated with 24 pictures of findings in the hands of people with cardiovascular disease. They demonstrated, using what they described as a "Sherlock Holmesian approach", how the condition of the heart might be revealed by clues in the hands. He begins with a quote from Arthur Conan Doyle's A Study in Scarlet (1887):

Let him, on meeting a fellow-mortal, learn at a glance to distinguish the history of the man, and the trade or profession to which he belongs. Puerile as such an exercise may seem, it sharpens the faculties of observation, and teaches one where to look and what to look for. By a man's finger-nails, by his coat-sleeve, by his boots, by his trouser-knees, by the callosities of his forefinger and thumb, by his expression, by his shirt-cuffs – by each of these things a man's calling is plainly revealed. That all united should fail to enlighten the competent inquirer in any case is almost inconceivable.

It made international headlines. Subsequently, Silverman co-authored a section on inspection in the second edition (1970) of Hurst's classic cardiology textbook The Heart. He remained affiliated with the Emory for the rest of his medical career, teaching students, nurses and residents.

=== Piedmont Hospital ===
After spending two years in the United States Air Force, Silverman returned to a faculty position in 1970, which was created for him by Hurst, and Silverman subsequently founded the cardiology programme at Piedmont Hospital in Atlanta, Georgia. Hurst later recounted:

We rotated cardiology fellows through Piedmont Hospital for twenty-five years. The experience they gained there was rewarding, as they learned a great deal from Silverman and other physicians. I never had a trainee who did not think more of the subject and the profession after working with Silverman.

He was the only consultant cardiologist at the Piedmont for eight years, during which time he was responsible for the cardiac stress test, echocardiography and electrophysiology units, and the cardiac rehabilitation and exercise centre.

By 1978, he was a full professor at the Emory and became involved in the founding of a number cardiology services at Piedmont. He was an advocate of preventive medicine and founded the Nicholas E. Davies Community Health Information Center, one of America's first libraries for patient education. In 1980, he published Heart attack, what's ahead? A manual for patient/consumer health education, a booklet for people with coronary heart disease that sold millions of copies, the royalties from which went to the American Heart Association. In 1991, he was appointed founding chief of the Fuqua Heart Center at Piedmont. He directed Piedmont's coronary care unit for over 25 years.

=== Wellcome Institute for the History of Medicine ===
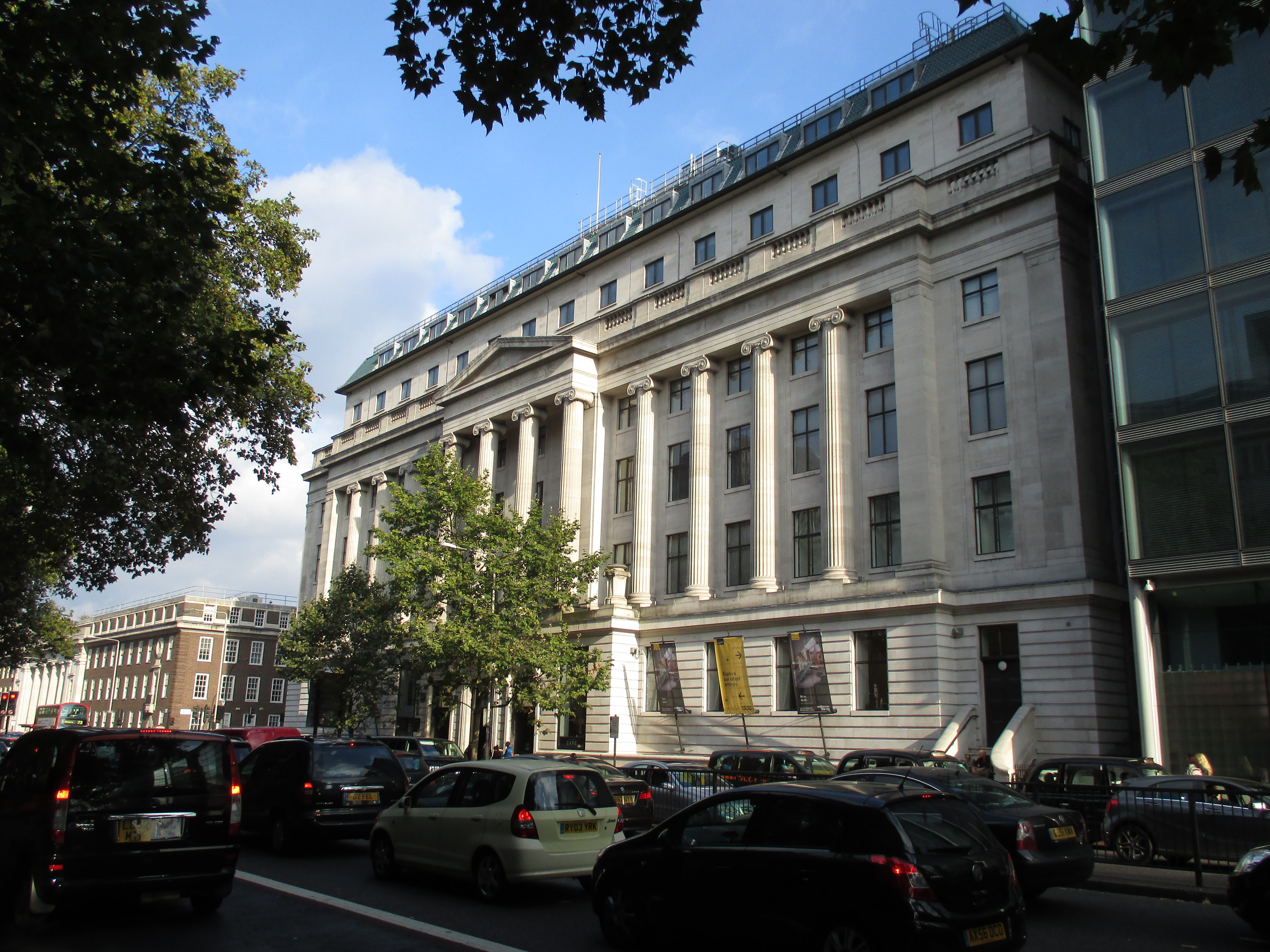
Wellcome Building

In 1998, Silverman became an academic fellow at the Wellcome Institute for the History of Medicine in London, where he spent six months researching and writing a book titled British Cardiology in the 20th Century, for which he was awarded a fellowship of the Royal College of Physicians.

Silverman authored a number of articles, chapters and five books. These included papers on British cardiologists, such as Paul Wood, inspired by his time at the Wellcome in London. In 2003, he co-authored a collection of 867 quotations by Sir William Osler in The Quotable Osler.

The influence of history also meant that when teaching new medical students, he would incorporate history of medicine by dressing as William Harvey and then read from De Motu Cordis.

== Honors and awards ==
In 1979, he became president of the Georgia Chapter of the American Heart Association and in 1986, received the Georgia Governor's Award in the Humanities.

Silverman was governor of the Georgia Chapter of the American College of Physicians (ACP) between 1995 and 1999 and was elected president of the American Osler Society for 2000–2001, and for both these organisations, he designed their ties.

In 2001, his work in British medical history was rewarded with a fellowship of the Royal Society of Medicine. In Atlanta, Silverman founded its Forum of Cardiology, Medical History Society and its Echocardiographic Society.

== Personal and family ==
In 1969, Silverman married Diana Howard. They have two sons, Joel and Adam.

== Death and legacy ==
In his final years, Silverman had been suffering with a rare disease of nerves, which caused him disturbing nerve sensations including the feelings of excessive heat and electric impulses. He described these symptoms as "like being in a vat of boiling oil, plus electric shocks" and found it notable that he "who had such an interest in teaching about rare diseases, would have such a rare disease that no neurologist had ever seen". He died unexpectedly on November 12, 2008.

The Mark E. Silverman Endowed Chair in Cardiology and Education was established in his name, and a tribute is held at Piedmont Heart every year. The Mark Silverman award is presented to a physician involved in the Georgia Chapter of the ACP who "has demonstrated excellence in bedside skills and teaching" and "served as an inspiration for younger physicians to advance their knowledge and training in medicine".

== Selected publications ==
Silverman authored more than 200 medical articles and a number of books.

=== Books ===
- Electrocardiography, basic concepts and clinical application. Co-authored with Robert J Myerburg and J Willis Hurst. New York : McGraw-Hill, (1983). OCLC 558440712
- Clinical skills for adult primary care. Co-authored with J Willis Hurst. Philadelphia : Lippincott-Raven (1996). ISBN 9780781703277
- British Cardiology in the 20th Century. Co-edited with Peter R. Fleming, Arthur Hollman, Desmond G. Julian and Dennis M. Krikler. Springer (2000). ISBN 9781447111993
- The quotable Osler. William Osler. Co-authored with Charles S. Bryan and T. J. Murray. Philadelphia : American College of Physicians (2002). ISBN 9781930513341
- J. Willis Hurst: His Life and Teachings. Co-authored with W. Bruce Fye and N. J. Mahwah, (2007). Foundation for Advances in Medicine and Science. ISBN 978-0-615-13546-5

=== Articles ===
- "The hand and the heart". Co-authored with J. Willis Hurst. The American Journal of Cardiology. November 1968 Vol.22, Issue 5, Pages 718–728. doi:10.1016/0002-9149(68)90211-7
- "The mitral complex. Interaction of the anatomy, physiology, and pathology of the mitral annulus, mitral valve leaflets, chordae tendineae, and papillary muscles". Co-authored with Hurst. American Heart Journal (1968) Sep;76(3):399-418. doi:10.1016/0002-8703(68)90237-8
- "Profiles in Cardiology; Charles J. B. Williams: English Pioneer in Auscultation". Clinical Cardiology (2007). Vol.30, pp. 532–534. doi:10.1002/clc.20148.
