= Caring for the Heart =

Medical history book

Caring for the Heart: Mayo Clinic and the Rise of Specialization
- Author: W. Bruce Fye
- Language: English
- Publisher: Oxford University Press
- Publication date: 2015
- Publication place: United States
- Pages: 704

Caring for the Heart: Mayo Clinic and the Rise of Specialization is a historical account of the diagnosis and treatment of heart disease in the United States during the twentieth century, written by American historian and cardiologist W. Bruce Fye, and published in 2015 by Oxford University Press. It highlights major medical advancements and the contributions of key individuals and institutions in both the United States and Europe. The Mayo Clinic in Rochester, Minnesota, is used as a central case study due to its prominent role in the development of diagnostic and surgical techniques. These innovations include the electrocardiograph, cardiac catheterisation, heart surgery, and coronary angiography. The book also examines the medical care provided to Franklin D. Roosevelt for his severe hypertension and heart failure.

== Publication ==
Caring for the Heart: Mayo Clinic and the Rise of Specialization was published in 2015 by Oxford University Press.

== Content ==
The book has 704 pages covering three main areas: the development of heart disease treatment, the evolution of the Mayo Clinic, and the rise of medical specialisation and technology. It begins with the history of the Mayo Clinic from its founding to the 1940s, alongside the development of cardiology in the United States and at the Mayo. It then presents case studies on heart surgery, diagnostic technologies including catheterisation and echocardiography, coronary care units, nursing, angioplasty, electrophysiology, and heart failure treatment, including transplants. There is account of Mayo’s role in World War II aviation medicine and its early refusal of NIH funding due to concerns over government control. Key contributions from institutions like the University of Minnesota and the Cleveland Clinic are also discussed.

The book also examines the medical care provided to Franklin D. Roosevelt for his severe hypertension and heart failure.
