= Association of Women's Health, Obstetric and Neonatal Nurses =

American professional organization

- Abbreviation: AWHONN
- Formation: 1969
- Type: Professional organization
- Purpose: Professional
- Headquarters: 1800 M Street, Suite 740S Washington, DC 20036
- Region served: US and Canada
- Members: Obstetric nurses, neonatal nurses, Women's health nursing|women's health nurses
- President: Cheryl Bellamy DNP, MS, BSFS, RN, CNM, CNS-C
- Website: www.awhonn.org

The Association of Women's Health, Obstetric and Neonatal Nurses (AWHONN) is a 501(c)(3) nonprofit membership organization. The stated purpose of AWHONN is to promote the health of women and newborns.

== History ==
AWHONN became a separate and independent organization in 1993. Using the Association of Women's Health, Obstetric and Neonatal Nurses (AWHONN) guidelines correctly can make staffing the safest possible. When these staffing guidelines are followed appropriately, they allow for quality care and more time for the nurse to spend at the bedside with the patient. The experience and skill mix of the nurses on the labor and delivery unit is another critical element of safe staffing. Nurses in labor and delivery units should have one patient to care for if the woman is having her labor induced or has chosen a birthing plan without pain medication or an epidural. Two nurses should be at every birth, one to care for the mom and the other to care for the baby. As far as post partum and mother baby units, the ratio is one nurse for every 3-4 couplets (mom and a baby) as long as they are all considered "stable".

== Sections and Chapters ==
There are 51 AWHONN Sections (one for each state, plus one that represents members in the US Armed Forces). Within each section, there are local chapters.

== Activities ==
=== Standards and Guidelines ===
AWHONN publishes Standards for Professional Nursing Practice in the Care of Women and Newborns. These standards define the roles, functions and competencies of nurses caring for women and newborns and delineate the various roles and behaviors for which the professional nurse is accountable.

AWHONN also publishes multiple evidence-based nursing guidelines for use by nurses caring for women and newborns. These evidence-based guidelines cover topics like fetal heart rate monitoring, labor induction, neonatal skin care, care of the late preterm infant, breastfeeding, HPV counseling, neonatal hyperbilirubinemia, nursing staffing, and care of the patient in the second stage of labor.

=== Legislative Programs ===
AWHONN works with members of Federal, State, and local governments to advocate for the health of women and newborns. AWHONN also provides education for nurses on how to become involved in the legislative process.

=== Publications ===
Professional Journals:

- Journal of Obstetric, Gynecologic, & Neonatal Nursing (JOGNN)
- Nursing for Women's Health

Consumer Publications and Websites:

- Healthy Mom & Baby
- Health4mom.org

=== Coalitions and Collaborations ===
AWHONN collaborates with other healthcare organizations that support health promotion and improvement for women and newborns.

- March of Dimes
- National Institute of Child Health and Human Development
- Coalition for Patients' Rights
- Partnership to End Cervical Cancer
- Americans for Nursing Shortage Relief (ANSR) Alliance
- American Heart Association (Go Red for Women Campaign)
- National Heart, Lung, and Blood Institute (The Heart Truth Campaign)

=== Research ===
AWHONN awards small research grants to members conducting research activities that are consistent with its mission.
