= Bill Stone (nephrologist) =

American nephrologist (1936–2020)

- Born: William J. Stone; 1 August 1936
- Died: 11 May 2020 (aged 83); Nashville
- Occupation: Physician
- Known for: Dialysis programmes in Tennessee, penicillin dosing in people with kidney problems
- Medical career
- Profession: Nephrologist
- Institutions: Vanderbilt University Medical Center
- Research: Kidney disease

Bill Stone (1 August 1936 – 11 May 2020), was a nephrologist at Vanderbilt University Medical Center. He was head of the kidney department at the Nashville Veterans Affairs Medical Center, part of the Tennessee Valley Healthcare System, for over 45 years. There, in the 1970s, he began the first dialysis treatments that could be performed both in a healthcare setting and at home. During this time he helped work out how to administer safe doses of penicillin to people with kidney failure, who otherwise might develop toxic levels of penicillin in their blood.

== Early life and education ==
William J. Stone was born on 1 August 1936 in Washington D. C., to William Spencer Stone, an army physician and later dean of University of Maryland Medical School, and his wife Louise Rankin Stone. After graduating from Princeton University in 1957, he gained his medical degree from the Johns Hopkins School of Medicine, and then worked at Vanderbilt University where he completed his medical residency before serving there as chief resident. Subsequently, he gained a nephrology fellowship at Cornell University.

== Career ==
He served as Major in the U.S. Army and Medical Officer at the 3rd Field Hospital in Saigon from 1968 to 1969, during the Vietnam War. After the war he was appointed assistant professor of medicine at Vanderbilt. In 1972, he became chief of Nephrology.

Stone was head of the kidney department at the Nashville Veterans Affairs Medical Center, part of the Tennessee Valley Healthcare System, for over 45 years. There, in the 1970s, he began the first dialysis treatments that could be performed both in a healthcare setting and at home. During this time, with infectious disease specialist Charles S. Bryan, he worked out how to administer safe doses of penicillin to people with kidney failure, who otherwise might develop toxic levels of penicillin in their blood.

== Personal and family ==
Stone composed limericks and produced five volumes on medical limericks. He was married to Elizabeth and they had three children.

== Death and legacy ==
He died on 11 May 2020 in Nashville. A renal dialysis unit is named for him.

== Selected publications ==
- Bryan, Charles S.; Stone, W. J. (1975). ""Comparably Massive" Penicillin G Therapy in Renal Failure". Annals of Internal Medicine. 82 (2): 189–95. doi:10.7326/0003-4819-82-2-189. PMID 1115440. (Co-authored)
