= Cooper, Kentucky =

Unincorporated community in Kentucky, United States

- Unincorporated community
- Location within Kentucky
- Coordinates: 36°46′16″N 84°51′41″W
- Country: United States
- State: Kentucky
- County: Wayne
- Elevation: 873 ft (266 m)
- Time zone: UTC-5 (Eastern (EST))
  - Summer (DST): UTC-4 (EDT)
- Area code: 606
- GNIS feature ID: 507751

Cooper is an unincorporated community in Wayne County, Kentucky, United States.

John Willis Hurst (1920–2011), physician, was born in Cooper.
