= Aequanimitas =

Essay by Sir William Osler

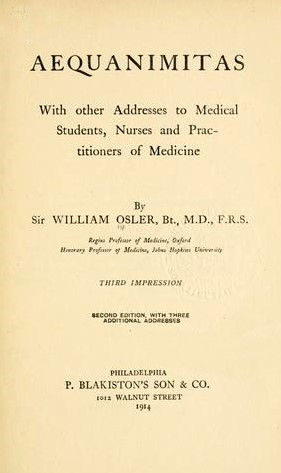
- Aequanimitas with Other Addresses to Medical Students, Nurses and Practitioners of Medicine, 1914.
- Author: Sir William Osler
- Language: English
- Publisher: P. Blakiston's Son & Co. (Philadelphia); H. K. Lewis (London)
- Publication date: 1st 1889

Aequanimitas was one of Sir William Osler's most famous essays, delivered to new doctors in 1889 as his farewell address at the Pennsylvania School of Medicine, prior to his transfer to Johns Hopkins. It was published in the same year and in 1904 appeared in his collection of essays titled Aequanimitas with Other Addresses to Medical Students, Nurses and Practitioners of Medicine. A second edition was produced in 1906, and a third in 1932. In the essay, Osler advocates two qualities "imperturbability" and "equanimity", which he defined as "coolness and presence of mind under all circumstances".

Between 1932 and 1953, Eli Lilly & Company distributed more than 150,000 copies of the third edition to medical graduates.

Through the years Osler's ideal of "Aequanimitas" has been analysed by various academics. Daniel Sokol, medical ethics and law expert, reasons in the British Medical Journal in 2007, that whatever interpretation is made of Aequanimitas, it "tackles head-on a timeless question: what makes a good doctor?".

== Publication ==
=== The essay ===
Aequanimitas was an essay by Sir William Osler, delivered to new doctors on 1 May 1889 as his farewell address at the Pennsylvania School of Medicine. It was published in the same year.

Aequanimitas refers to staying calm and composed. In the essay, Osler advocates two qualities "imperturbability" and "equanimity", which he defined as "coolness and presence of mind under all circumstances".

=== 1904 and 1906 ===
In 1904, Aequanimitas was published by H. K. Lewis in Aequanimitas with Other Addresses to Medical Students, Nurses and Practitioners of Medicine, a collection of his essays. A second edition was produced in 1906 by P. Blakiston's Son & Co. in Philadelphia, and H.K. Lewis in London.

=== Eli Lilly & Company ===
Following Osler's death, an expanded version of the book appeared as a third edition in 1932. It omits the essays "A Way of life", "A man's redemption of man" and "The old humanities and new science", and became more widely available than the previous editions.

Between 1932 and 1953, Eli Lilly & Company distributed more than 150,000 copies of the third edition to medical graduates. These volumes were not all the same. There were at least seven different publications in English and one in each of Spanish and Portuguese. There were variations in the type of paper, book size, title page, information on the spine, and printing information. There were also differences in the congratulatory letters from Eli Lilly, placed in each book.

== Interpretation ==
Through the years Osler's ideal of "Aequanimitas" has been criticised on the grounds that it excludes empathy, sympathy, or emotional resonance with patients. One of the strongest critiques was presented by Gerald Weissmann in his book The Woods Hole Cantata (1985). It had been published the previous year in Hospital Practice, as an essay entitled "Against Aequanimitas". Weissmann's assessment of Osler led him to conclude that Osler's advice held "the public tone of the academic snob". After reciting Osler's description of "imperturbability", Weissmann held the opinion that "the Oslerian view is not only devoid of passion, but [also] of joy".

Osler however, did not that day in 1889 intend to give the graduating medical students comprehensive advice about how to practice medicine. His involvement was a relatively small part of a busy commencement programme, in which the principal honoree was the retiring professor of surgery, David Hayes Agnew ("Agnew day"). Charles S. Bryan later explains that Osler deliberately confined his remarks to two of the qualities the students would need in practice. Osler emphasized the need to balance "head" and "heart". In his interpretation the balance varies according to the nature of the task at hand and Aequanimitas is best understood as emotions appropriate to the circumstances rather than as indifference as suggested by the critiques.

Daniel Sokol, medical ethics and law expert, reasons in the British Medical Journal in 2007, that whatever interpretation is made of Aequanimitas, it "tackles head-on a timeless question: what makes a good doctor?".

== Legacy ==
Japan's prime minister's physician, Shigeaki Hinohara, was given a copy of Aequanimitas in the early days of the United States Military Occupation of Japan after the Second World War. Hinohara subsequently translated the title address and paraphrased the rest. In 1948, he published a book entitled The Life of Dr. Osler—Pioneer of American Medicine.

The term aequanimitas has become a motto. At Johns Hopkins, it appears on ties and scarves worn by the housestaff, and was mentioned in the television programme House.

A similar concept to aequanimitas was addressed by Steve Jobs at Stanford University in 2005. Daniel Goleman's notion of emotional intelligence has been described as a modern variation of aequanimitas.
