= Sir William Osler: An Encyclopedia =

Sir William Osler: An Encyclopedia (2019) is a book based around the life of Sir William Osler, authored by over 135 individuals, compiled and edited by American professor of infectious diseases, Charles S. Bryan.
