= Springer Publishing =

American publishing company

- Parent company: Mannheim Media
- Status: Active
- Founded: 1950; 76 years ago
- Country of origin: United States
- Headquarters location: Salmon Tower Building; New York City
- Distribution: self-distributed (US); Login Canada (Canada); Viva Books (India); Taylor & Francis (Asia); Footprint Books (Australia); Eurospan Group (EMEA)
- Nonfiction topics: Nursing, gerontology, psychology, social work, counseling, public health, and rehabilitation
- Imprints: Demos Medical Publishing
- Official website: www.springerpub.com

Springer Publishing Company is an American publishing company of academic journals and books, focusing on the fields of nursing, gerontology, psychology, social work, counseling, public health, and rehabilitation (neuropsychology). It was established in 1951 by Bernhard Springer, a great-grandson of Julius Springer, and is based in Midtown Manhattan, New York City.

== History ==
Springer Publishing Company was founded in 1950 by Bernhard Springer, the Berlin-born great-grandson of Julius Springer, who founded Springer-Verlag (now Springer Science+Business Media). Springer Publishing's first landmark publications included Livestock Health Encyclopedia by R. Seiden and the 1952 Handbook of Cardiology for Nurses. The company's books soon branched into other fields, including medicine and psychology. Nursing publications grew rapidly in number, as Modell's Drugs in Current Use, a small annual paperback, sold over 150,000 copies over several editions. Solomon Garb's Laboratory Tests for Nurses, first published in 1954, sold nearly 240,000 copies over six editions in 25 years. In its second decade, the firm expanded into new publishing areas to reflect the rapidly expanding health care industry. Gerontology was a growing topic of interest, and in the 1960s Bernhard Springer published six titles on aging. Meanwhile, publications in psychiatry and psychology continued to grow.

After Bernhard Springer's death in 1970, his wife Ursula assumed responsibility for the company, and the firm continued to expand, adding titles in social work, counseling, rehabilitation, and public health, in addition to publishing journals, and annual reviews. In 2004, Ursula Springer sold Springer Publishing Company to Mannheim Holdings, LLC, a subsidiary of the Mannheim Trust. In 2008 they established a division to focus on nursing, and "signs to look for" when abuse is suspected. In 2015, Demos Medical Publishing merged into Springer Publishing.

== Journals ==
Springer Publishing publishes the following academic journals:

- Annals of LGBTQ Public and Population Health
- Annual Review of Gerontology and Geriatrics
- Annual Review of Nursing Research
- Biogerontology
- Care Management Journals
- Clinical Lactation
- Clinical Scholars Review
- Connect: The World of Critical Care Nurse
- Creative Nursing
- Current Hypertension Reports
- Ethical Human Psychology and Psychiatry
- Ethical Human Sciences and Services
- International Journal of Childbirth
- International Journal for Human Caring
- Journal of Applied Rehabilitation Counseling
- Journal of Cell Communication and Signaling
- Journal of Cognitive Education and Psychology
- Journal of Cognitive Psychotherapy
- Journal of Doctoral Nursing Practice
- Journal of EMDR Practice and Research
- Journal of Financial Counseling and Planning
- Journal of Nursing Measurement
- Journal of Perinatal Education
- Minority Nurse
- Neonatal Network
- Nursing History Review
- Partner Abuse
- Rehabilitation Education
- Rehabilitation Research, Policy, and Education
- Research and Theory for Nursing Practice
- Scholarly Inquiry for Nursing Practice
- Sports Medicine
- Theory and Society
- Urban Social Work
- Violence & Victims
