= Obstetrical nursing =

Prenatal care and pregnancy nursing specialty

Obstetrical nursing, also called perinatal nursing, is a nursing specialty that works with patients who are attempting to become pregnant, are currently pregnant, or have recently delivered. Obstetrical nurses help provide prenatal care and testing, care of patients experiencing pregnancy complications, care during labor and delivery, and care of patients following delivery. Obstetrical nurses work closely with obstetricians, midwives, and nurse practitioners. They also provide supervision of patient care technicians and surgical technologists.

== Job description ==
Obstetrical nurses perform a number of tasks, like mammograms, administering medications through IV's, monitoring newborns, stress test evaluations, cardiac monitoring, vascular monitoring, and health assessments. Obstetrical nurses are required to possess specialized skills such as electronic fetal monitoring, nonstress tests, neonatal resuscitation, and medication administration by continuous intravenous drip.

The workload and daily routine of obstetrical nurses requires them to be detailed and organized, possess mental and physical strength and emotional stability, and to possess critical thinking skills.

Common workplaces for obstetrical nurses are as follows:

- Hospital maternity wards
- Family planning centers
- Private birthing centers
- Urgent care clinics
- Obstetrics & Gynecology (OB/GYN) offices
- Midwife practice
- Community clinics

In the U.S. and Canada, the professional nursing organization for obstetrical nurses is the Association of Women's Health, Obstetric and Neonatal Nursing (AWHONN).

== Demographics/Outlook ==
Obstetrical nurses in the U.S. make an average of about US$148,000 annually plus benefits. It can vary depending on location.

The gender ratio of obstetrical nurses is 3% male and 97% female. Furthermore, ethnicities are the following: White 66.2%, Black 10.5%, Hispanic 9.5%, Asian 9%, unknown 4.3% and American Indian and Alaska Native 0.5%.

== Educational and certification requirements ==
Obstetrical nurses typically start as registered nurses, which means that they first obtain a degree or diploma in nursing. An internship in obstetrics suffices in order to start at an entry-level position. The National Certification Corporation (NCC) offers certifications for obstetrical nurses. These include RNC-OB (Inpatient Obstetrics), a certification that allows graduate nurses who have completed a bachelor's degree in the US or Canada to expand into obstetrics; in order to gain an RNC-OB certificate, an online exam must be taken. RNC-MNN (Maternal Newborn Nursing) is another online exam for certified registered nurses, who have completed their bachelor's degrees in nursing, have gained experience in the area of newborn nursing and want to gain a certification/qualification in the area. They have a 90-day window to complete the actual exam. A third online certification is C-EFM (Electronic Fetal Monitoring). It is open to licensed registered nurses, nurse practitioners, nurse midwives, physicians, physician assistants, and paramedics, according to the US and Canada requirements.

=== Australian certification and requirements ===
Bachelor's degrees in either nursing and/or midwifery are required to become an obstetrical or perinatal nurse in Australia. In Australia alone there are 32 different universities that offer nursing as an undergraduate degree, including Australian Catholic University, Charles Darwin University and the University of Notre Dame Australia. Once completing their degree, they are required to complete their master's degree in nursing. Bachelor's degrees and jobs as licensed nurses/midwives are required in order to be accepted for the master's degree. There are 24 different universities in Australia that offer a master's degree in nursing, including Edith Cowan University, Monash University, James Cook University and University of Canberra.
