= Hurst's the Heart =

Medical textbook

Hurst's The Heart
- Language: English
- Subject: Cardiology
- Genre: Reference
- Published: 1966 (First ed.); 2022 (15th ed.); McGraw-Hill Education
- ISBN: 978-1-264-25756-0 (15th ed.)

Hurst's The Heart is a medical textbook published by McGraw-Hill Education. First released in 1966, it is currently in its 15th edition. It covers the field of cardiology and is one of the most widely used medical textbooks in the world.

== Background ==
The first edition of the book, titled The Heart, was written in 1966 by John Willis Hurst, who had served as the cardiologist of former U.S. President Lyndon B. Johnson. In 1986, the book was renamed Hurst's The Heart. It is currently in its 15th edition published as Fuster and Hurst's The Heart in June 2022.

== Manual of Cardiology ==
Hurst's the Heart: Manual of Cardiology provides a summary of the clinical content of its larger companion textbook. It features a streamlined, quick-access presentation designed for use in emergencies and urgent clinical situations. It is edited by Robert A. O'Rourke.

== Reception ==
The book has been described as a "widely read textbook of cardiology", and a "standard reference" work. According to The New York Times, Hurst's The Heart has become one of the most widely used medical textbooks in the world.
