= Demos Medical Publishing =

American medical publisher

- Parent company: Springer Publishing
- Founded: 1986; 40 years ago
- Founder: Diana M. Schneider
- Country of origin: United States
- Headquarters location: New York City
- Publication types: Books
- Nonfiction topics: Health
- Official website: www.springerpub.com/medicine.html

Demos Medical Publishing, now an imprint of Springer Publishing Company, publishes books on neurology, oncology, pathology, and other medical subjects. It targets physicians, families, and individuals with disabilities. The company was founded in 1986 by Diana M. Schneider. A majority interest in the company was purchased by the Mannheim Trust in 2004. Demos merged with Springer Publishing in 2015.
