= Infection Control & Hospital Epidemiology =

- Discipline: Medicine
- Language: English
- Edited by: Suzanne F. Bradley

Publication details
- History: 1980–present
- Publisher: Cambridge University Press for the Society for Healthcare Epidemiology of America (United States)
- Frequency: monthly
- Impact factor: 4.5 (2022)

Standard abbreviations
- ISO 4: Infect. Control Hosp. Epidemiol.

Indexing
- ISSN: 0899-823X (print); 1559-6834 (web)
- OCLC no.: 17410391

Links
- Journal homepage

Infection Control & Hospital Epidemiology is a peer-reviewed medical journal published by Cambridge University Press. It publishes research on control and evaluation of the transmission of pathogens in healthcare institutions and on the use of epidemiological principles and methods to evaluate and improve the delivery of care, including infection control practices, surveillance, cost-benefit analyses, resource use, occupational health, and regulatory issues. The journal is published for the Society for Healthcare Epidemiology of America.
