= Center for Bioethics and Medical Humanities =

University of Mississippi Medical Center unit

- Established: 2008
- Parent institution: University of Mississippi Medical Center
- Director: Ralph Didlake
- Location: Jackson, Mississippi, United States

The Center for Bioethics and Medical Humanities (CBMH) is located at the University of Mississippi Medical Center (UMMC) in Jackson, Mississippi. The center is designed to support the education, research and clinical missions of UMMC by focusing on ethics, professionalism, and the social context of modern health care. The center was established in 2008 by a challenge grant from the Bower Foundation and is directed by Dr. Ralph Didlake. The core faculty of the CBMH consists of full-time UMMC faculty members who have specific training and expertise in the broad spectrum of bioethics issues addressed by the center.

== Activities ==
A student Bioethics Fellowship was established in June 2010 as a collaborative effort between the CBMH and Department of Philosophy and Religion at the University of Mississippi. The CBMH serves as the home of UMMC's Quality Enhancement Plan to reaffirm professionalism as a core value in all of its training programs. The center also maintains a Professionalism Resource Catalog that provides instructional materials in the areas of ethics, professionalism and cultural competency.

== Lectures ==
The Paradox of Affluence: Choices, Challenges and Consequences

The Evolution of American Bioethics
