= Neonatal Network =

- Discipline: Neonatal nursing
- Language: English
- Edited by: Debbie Fraser

Publication details
- History: 1981–present
- Publisher: Springer Publishing
- Frequency: Bimonthly

Standard abbreviations
- ISO 4: Neonatal Netw.

Indexing
- CODEN: NEONEE
- ISSN: 0730-0832 (print); 1539-2880 (web)
- OCLC no.: 7938261

Links
- Journal homepage; Online access; Online archive

Neonatal Network: The Journal of Neonatal Nursing is a bimonthly peer-reviewed healthcare journal on neonatal nursing. It is the official journal of the Academy of Neonatal Nursing and is published by Springer Publishing. Neonatal Network was established in 1981. As of 2012, the editor-in-chief is Debbie Fraser.

== Abstracting and indexing ==
Neonatal Network is indexed or abstracted in CINAHL, Web of Science ESCI, the International Nursing Index, Index Medicus, and RNdex Top 100.

== See also ==
- List of nursing journals
