= J. Willis Hurst =

American physician

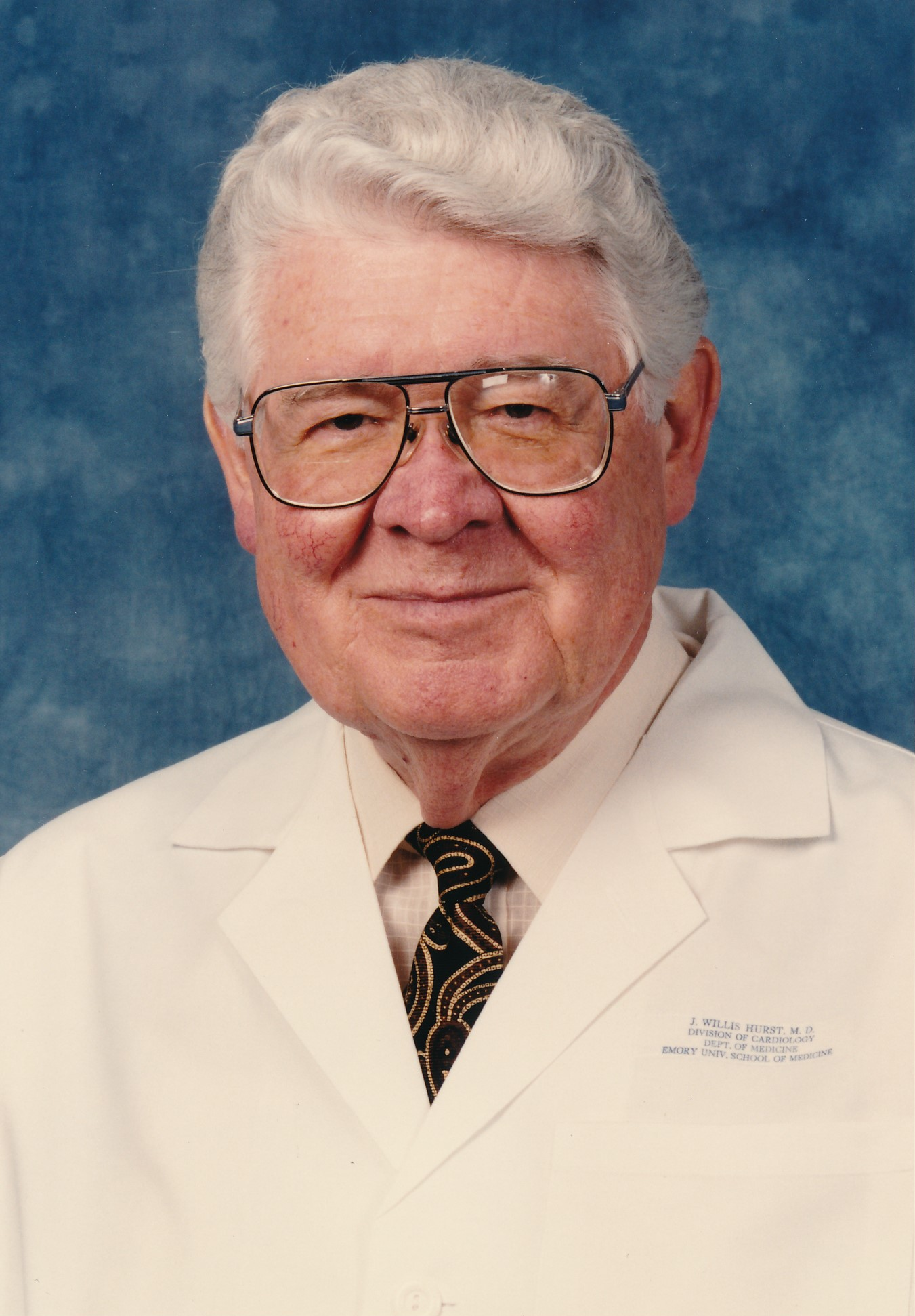
- Born: October 21, 1920; Cooper, Kentucky, US
- Died: October 1, 2011 (aged 90); Atlanta, Georgia, US
- Education: West Georgia College; University of Georgia; Medical College of Georgia
- Occupation: Cardiologist
- Spouse: Nelie Hurst (m. 1942)

John Willis Hurst (October 21, 1920 – October 1, 2011) was an American physician who served as the cardiologist of former U.S. President Lyndon B. Johnson. He was the editor of Hurst's the Heart, one of the most widely used medical textbooks in the world. He also served as a former president of the American Heart Association.

Throughout his career, Hurst was recognized as a leader in cardiology.

== Early life and education ==
John Willis Hurst was the only child of John Hurst and Verna Bell Hurst. He was born in Cooper, Kentucky, a community near Monticello, Kentucky, in Wayne County, Kentucky, on October 21, 1920. In Cooper, Hurst's father owned and operated a general store.

Eleven months after he was born, Hurst's family moved to Carrollton, Georgia. In Carrollton, Hurst's father served as the principal of a small, local school. During this time, Hurst's family lived in dormitory style housing on the school's grounds with several other teachers, including his aunt. In 1932, Hurst's father quit teaching in order to assist with the development of the Carrollton Federal Savings and Loan Association. At this time, the family moved to a single family home on Cefar Street.

Hurst graduated from Carrollton High School in 1937. He then enrolled at West Georgia College in Carrollton. At West Georgia College he met his future wife Nelie Wiley. After two years, Hurst transferred to the University of Georgia. There, he obtained a Bachelor of Science in zoology and a Bachelor of Science in chemistry.

In 1941, Hurst began his studies at the Medical College of Georgia. He graduated first in his class in 1944. He then began his internship and residency at the University Hospital in Augusta, Georgia.

== Career ==
In 1946, after completing his residency, Hurst was drafted into the army and was stationed at Fitzsimons General Hospital near Denver, Colorado. During this time he obtained the rank of captain. His tour of duty in Denver was cut short, however, as Hurst was allowed to return home following the news of an automobile accident that killed his mother-in-law and severely injured his sister-in-law.

Then, in 1947 Hurst began working as a fellow at Massachusetts General Hospital. There he met Dr. Paul Dudley White, the Father of American cardiology, who became one of Hurst's most influential mentors. Meeting White prompted Hurst to commit to specializing in cardiology.

After completing his fellowship in Massachusetts, Hurst returned to Georgia in 1949 and briefly established a private practice in Atlanta. Then, in 1950, he accepted a job offer at Emory University.

In 1954, Hurst was drafted for the second time. He was assigned to the Bethesda Naval Hospital, where he was appointed Chief of Cardiology. On July 2, 1955, Lyndon B. Johnson, then majority leader of the senate, suffered a heart attack. It was during this incident that Hurst took on the role of Johnson's personal cardiologist. He continued to serve as Johnson's cardiologist until Johnson's death in 1973. Hurst even traveled with Johnson to 15 countries when Johnson served as the vice president during the Kennedy administration. Hurst declined the offer to serve as White House Physician during Johnson's presidency.

Hurst was honorably discharged from the military in 1955 and returned to Emory University. There, he resumed teaching and also practiced consultative cardiology. In 1957, Hurst was named the Chairman of the Department of Medicine at Emory, a position he held until 1986. Even after stepping down from the role of chairman, Hurst continued to teach at Emory. In the early 1960s, Hurst assisted with the creation of both the continuing medical education program in cardiology at Emory and the Emory Clinic. Then, in 1991, Hurst was named as a consultant to Emory's Division of Cardiology, Department of Medicine. He continued in this role until 2007. During his time at Emory, Hurst taught more than 5,000 residents and 2,500 residents and fellows.

Hurst served a term as the president of the American Heart Association and a term as the president of the Association of Professors of Medicine. He was also a member of the National Heart, Lung and Blood Council. He also served as Chairman for the Subspecialty Board of Cardiovascular Disease.

== Publications ==
Throughout his career, Hurst edited over 60 books and published over 350 scientific articles. His works include a children's book and several novels.

=== Selected bibliography ===
- Hurst, J. Willis; Woodson, Grattan C. (1952). Atlas of spatial vector electrocardiography. New York: Blakiston.
- Hurst's The Heart (first published 1966, currently in its fourteenth edition)
- Hurst, J. Willis (1970). Four hats: on teaching medicine and other essays. Chicago. ISBN 978-0815147831.
- Hurst, J. Willis, ed. (1983). Medicine, for the practicing physician. Boston: Butterworths. ISBN 9780409950311. (first published 1983, currently in its fourth edition)
- Hurst, J. Willis (1992). The bench and me: teaching and learning medicine. New York: Igaku-Shoin. ISBN 9780896402232.
- Hurst, J. Willis; Alpert, Joseph S. (1994). Diagnostic atlas of the heart. New York: Raven Press. ISBN 978-0781700580.
- Hurst, J. Willis (1995). Cardiac puzzles. London: Mosby-Wolfe. ISBN 9780723424697.
- Hurst, J. Willis (1997). The quest for excellence: the history of the Department of Medicine at Emory University School of Medicine, 1834-1986. Atlanta, GA: Scholars Press. ISBN 0788503944.
- Hurst, J. Willis (1999). The heart: the kids' question and answer book. New York: McGraw-Hill. ISBN 9780070318298.
- Hurst, Philip W.; Hurst, J. Willis (2000). Prescription for Greed. Frederic C. Beil. ISBN 9781929490042.
- Chest Pain (2001, co-edited with Douglas C. Morris, M.D.)
- Tarnished (2005, cowritten with his son Philip W. Hurst)
- The Last Leaf has Fallen (2007)
- Short, Short Stories and Random Thoughts (2009)
- The Bald-Headed Man with Long Gray Hair: A Short Story (2010)

== Honors and awards ==
- Lamartine Hardman Cup (1968) - Medical Association of Georgia
- Master Teacher Award (1970, 1974)- American College of Cardiology
- Gifted Teacher Award (1974)- American College of Cardiology
- Gold Heart Award (1974) - American Heart Association
- Herrick Award (1980)- American Heart Association
- Distinguished Teacher Award (1985) - American College of Physicians
- Evangeline Papageorge Teaching Award (1995) - Emory University

== Personal life ==
On December 20, 1942, John Willis Hurst married Nelie Wiley Hurst. Together, they had three sons: John W. Hurst Jr., J. Stephen Hurst, and Philip W. Hurst. Nelie died on April 26, 2004.

John W. Hurst Jr. followed in his father's footsteps and currently works as a cardiologist in Atlanta, GA.
