= Neonatal nursing =

Specialty of nursing

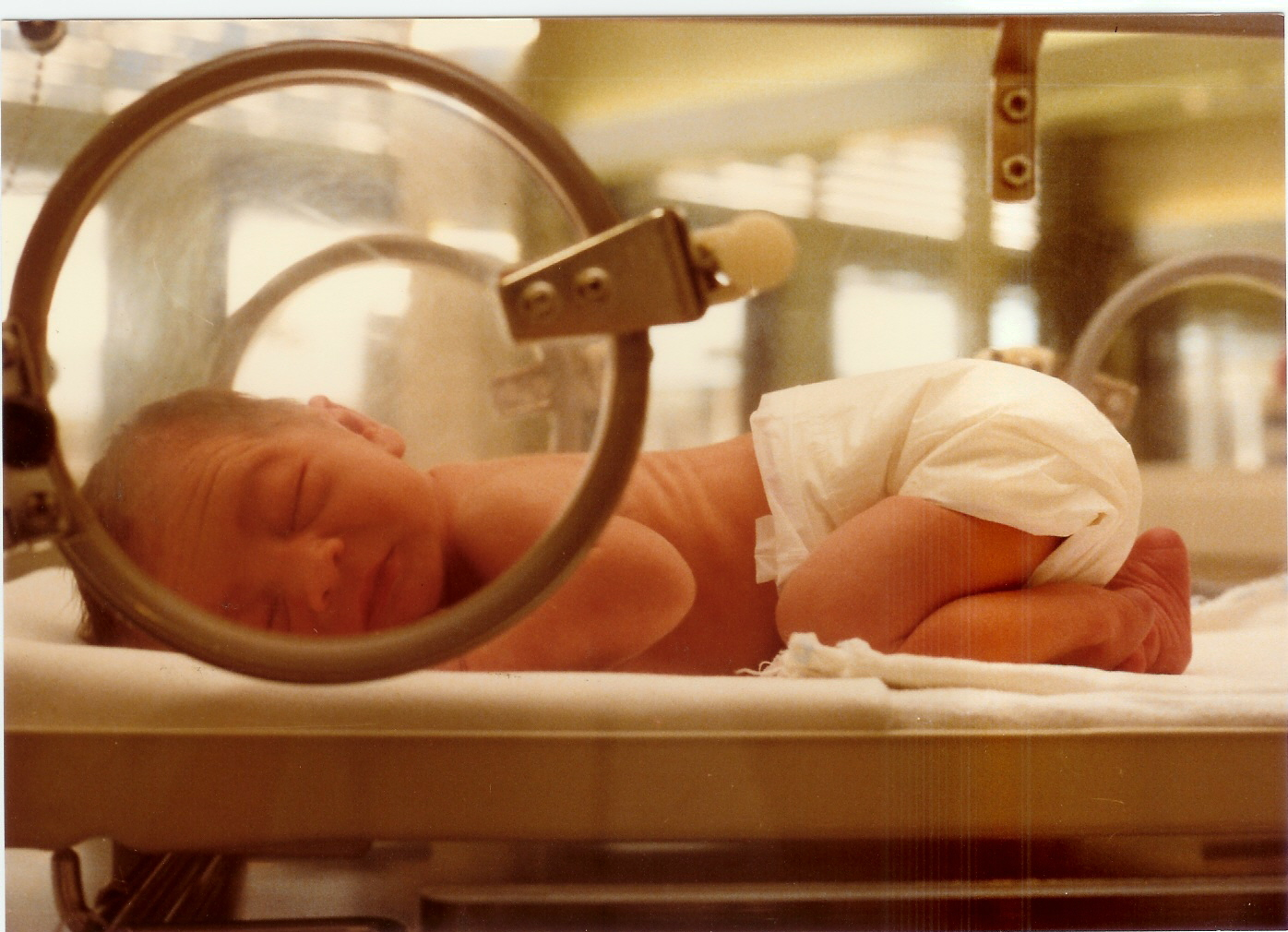
An infant placed in a neonatal intensive care unit

Neonatal nursing is a sub-specialty of nursing care for newborn infants up to 28 days after birth. The term neonatal comes from neo ("new") and "natal" pertaining to (birth or origin). Neonatal nursing requires a high degree of skill, dedication and emotional strength, as they care for newborn infants with a range of. These need ones vary between prematurity, birth defects, infection, cardiac malformations, and surgical condition. Nurses are a vital part of the neonatal care team and are required to know basic newborn resuscitation, be able to control the newborn's temperature, the initiation of cardiopulmonary and pulse oximetry monitoring. Most neonatal nurses care for infants from the time of birth until they are discharged from the hospital.

== Levels of the neonatal nursery ==
There are four different levels of nurseries where a neonatal nurse might work. The updated classification of neonatal levels by the American Academy of Pediatrics (AAP) includes a Level IV.

- Level I Consists of caring for healthy newborns. Level I nurses are now uncommon in the United States. Healthy babies typically share a room with their mother, and both patients are usually discharged from the hospital quickly.
- Level II Provides intermediate or special care for premature or ill newborns. At this level, infants may need special therapy provided by nursing staff, or may simply need more time before being discharged.
- Level III, The Neonatal intensive-care unit (NICU), treats newborns who cannot be treated in the other levels and are in need of high technology to survive, such as breathing and feeding tubes. Nurses comprise over 90 percent of the NICU staff.
- Level IV The highest level of neonatal, offering all Level III plus it evolves involves the extensive care the most critically and complex newborns. This facility will have 24-hour resident neonatologists and surgeons. They are involved with intricate surgical repairs like congenital cardiac issues and acquired malformations.

== Safety precautions and careful measures ==
Over many years, research and evidence-based practice regimes have been incorporated into everyday nursing protocols to eliminate human error. In neonatal nurses' long shifts and busy schedules lead to an increase in tiredness and is the number one reason leading to a lack of attention causing human errors. To prevent this from continuously happening, safety checks and measures are put into place so nurses can provide the most optimal care. Some of these practices include extensive interviews to confirm that those being hired are qualified and willing to continue to learn throughout their careers so they can be the best nurses possible. Strong communication skills are key in any nursing practice notifying your team members of changes in your patients' status will save their lives. One nurse cannot be at the hospital at all times, so every healthcare member must use teamwork and collaboration to keep each other up to date and to keep their patients alive. Some other key measures include following; old protocols and adapting to and utilizing new protocols, checking labels frequently, multiple times before administering a drug, the need for a high attention span, and completing rounds regularly every shift. These are just a few of the safety measures that neonatal nurses must follow to provide the best care.

== Changes in neonatal care ==
Neonatal care became a specialty in the United States in 1960 and in that same year, the first NICU was established in the United States. There have been some major changes in Neonatal Care over the past 120 years. Some of these changes include the invention of the incubator, changes in respiratory care and the development of surfactants.

=== The incubator ===
An incubator is a plastic dome-shaped machine designed as a crib that regulates a newborn infant's body temperature. The incubator is designed to allow the temperature to be adjusted according to the state of the baby's current body heat. A range of five types of incubators all serve different purposes in the neonatal intensive care unit. The closed-box incubator is used to prevent infection that could be contracted the outside of the box; it filtrates the air and keeps the moisture fresh. The double-walled incubator keeps heat inside the box. Servo-controlled incubators are controlled by skin detectors which are designed to recognize the loss or gain of body heat and make adjustments to maintain the correct temperature. The open box incubator produces heat from beneath the baby to keep it warm. Portable incubators transport the newborn to and from different parts of the hospital. In 1880, Dr. Tarnier was convinced that the maintenance of internal temperature was key to the premature infant's survival. This led him to introduce the first human incubator. Inspired by chicken eggs hatching in an incubator, he asked a zoo keeper to design a similar incubator for premature infants. Dr. Delee expanded the use and function of the incubator by incorporating an oxygen chamber and an electric controlled thermostat which allowed the incubator to be transported in ambulances.

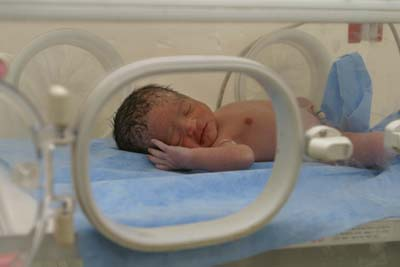

=== Respiratory care ===
Administration of oxygen assists and generates oxygen intake for neonates. Oxygen administration began with a metal forked device in the nostrils, and it is now administered through thin plastic tubes in the nostrils also known as nasal cannula. The first ventilation of an infant was in 1961 in a positive pressure situation, and mechanical ventilation was improved in 1971. Mechanical ventilation is the process in which a machine, attached to the patient, regulates breathing by pumping air in and out of the lungs. Another type of breathing mechanism used is the continuous positive airway pressure (CPAP) mask which attaches to the face to help with breathing. These masks were first used in 1973 as an alternate less invasive form of support.

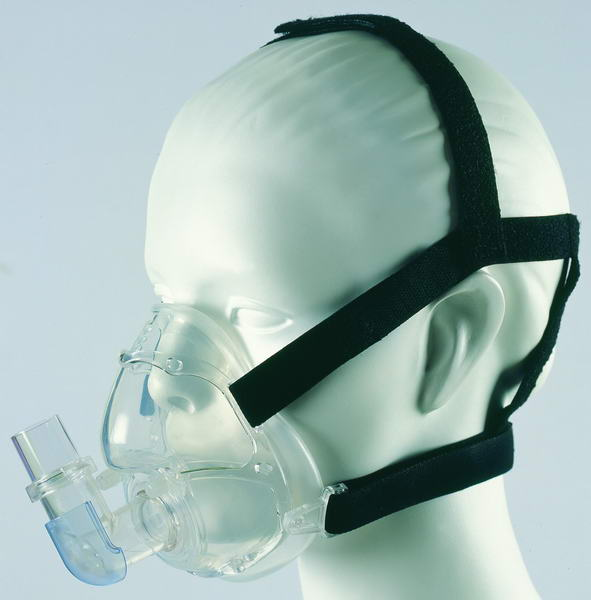
Note: the CPAP mask shown in the photo is an adult model.

=== Surfactants ===
A surfactant allows a substance to get "wet" which reduces surface tension that allows fluids to spread in an easier manner to help another substance dissolve. In 1910, the first study of the use of surfactants on infants took place in Japan. Surfactant therapy since has improved the infant mortality rate by 50%. Surfactants combined with the least invasive respiratory therapy bubble CPAP or nasal CPAP has greatly improved the infant mortality rate in the US.

=== Family involvement (United States) ===
In the later 70s, family involvement in treatment became a major addition to patient treatment plans. This decade allowed for upgrades in visiting hours. Hours were expanded and siblings and fathers were encouraged to assist the mother in physical treatment. Many studies showed that with the higher frequency of family interaction such as bottle feeding, skin-to-skin contact, and overall baby holding, and support allowed for patients to have overall major health improvements which eventually lead to a decreasing need for ventilators and quicker discharge rates.

== Qualifications and requirements ==
=== United States ===
Healthcare institutions have varying entry-level requirements for neonatal nurses. Neonatal nurses are Registered Nurses (RNs), and therefore must have an Associate of Science in Nursing (ASN) or Bachelor of Science in Nursing (BSN) degree. Some countries or institutions may also require a midwifery qualification. Some institutions may accept newly graduated RNs who have passed the NCLEX exam; others may require additional experience working in adult-health or medical/surgical nursing.

Some countries offer postgraduate degrees in neonatal nursing, such as the Master of Science in Nursing (MSN) and various doctorates. A nurse practitioner may be required to hold a postgraduate degree. The National Association of Neonatal Nurses recommends two years' experience working in a NICU before taking graduate classes.

As with any registered nurse, local licensing or certifying bodies as well as employers may set requirements for continuing education.

There are no mandated requirements to becoming an RN in a NICU, although neonatal nurses must complete the Neonatal Resuscitation Program. Some units prefer new graduates who do not have experience in other units, so they may be trained in the specialty exclusively, while others prefer nurses with more experience.

Intensive care nurses receive intensive didactic and clinical orientation, in addition to their general nursing knowledge, to provide highly specialized care for critical patients. Their competencies include the administration of high-risk medications, management of high-acuity patients requiring ventilator support, surgical care, resuscitation, advanced interventions such as extracorporeal membrane oxygenation or hypothermia therapy for neonatal encephalopathy procedures, as well as chronic-care management or lower acuity cares associated with premature infants such as feeding intolerance, phototherapy, or administering antibiotics. NICU RNs undergo annual skills tests and are subject to additional training to maintain contemporary practice.

=== Europe ===
The first step to qualify is to complete a nursing degree. To gain entry into a nursing degree, it is required to have at least GCSE (A-C) in English, Mathematics and a science-based subject, and two to three A-levels with one being in a biological science.

=== United Kingdom ===
Neonatal nurses must complete a 3-year degree program in nursing or midwifery and be either a RN(adult), RN(child) or a RM. Once a registered practitioner, they can work in special care and some high dependency areas. It is a requirement to complete a recognized neonatal intensive care course to become qualified in specialty (QIS) to care for intensive care babies and to supervise other nurses.

=== Australia ===
In Australia, a neonatal nurse first needs to be a Registered Nurse (RN) or Midwife.

Two years of nursing experience are needed, as is practical experience and employment in the neonatal unit before being eligible to undertake postgraduate studies in neonatal nursing. This usually requires undertaking a Graduate Diploma Degree in Clinical Nursing.

== Neonatal nursing across the globe and mortality rates ==
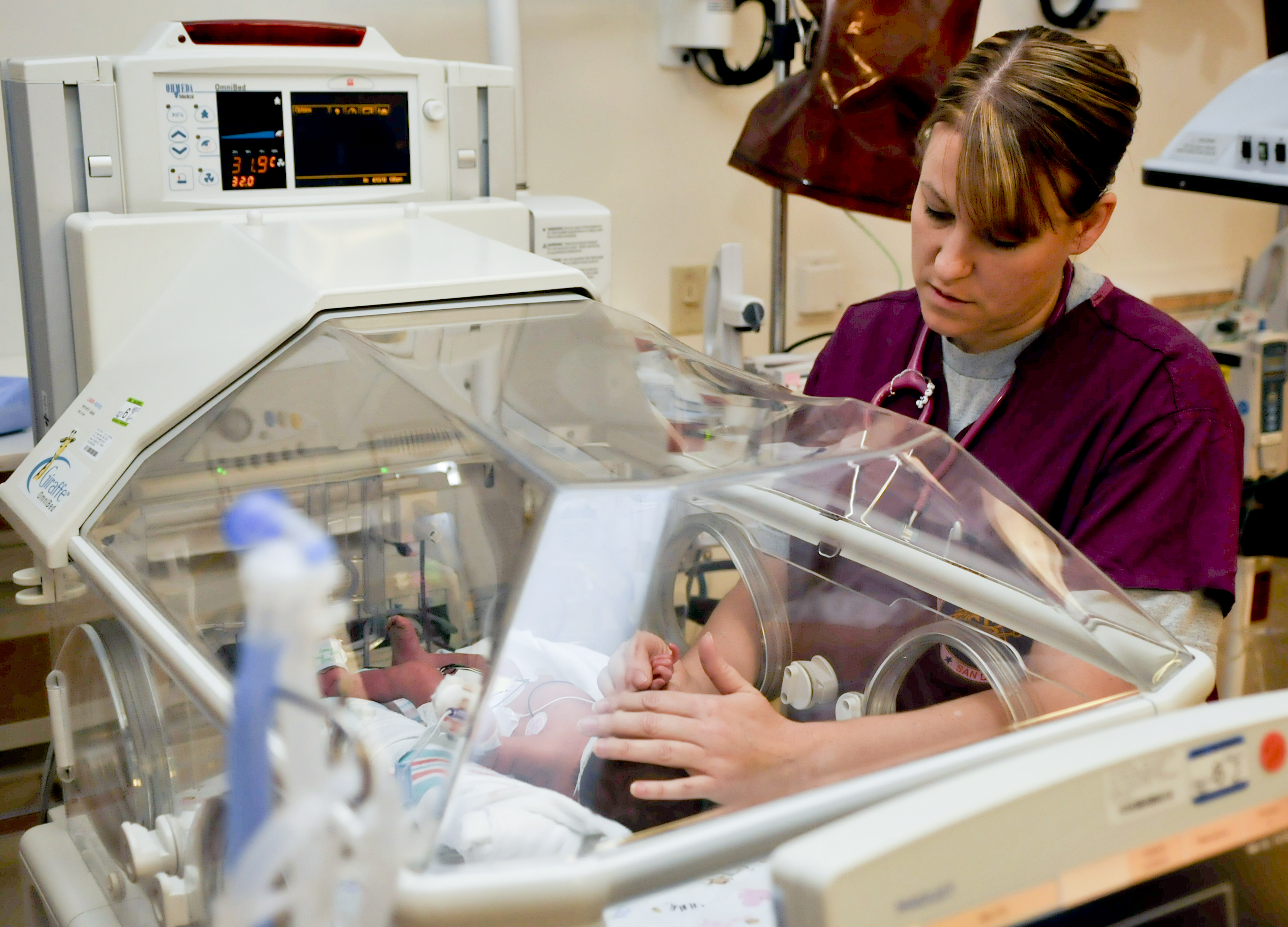
A Neonatal nurse examining a newborn baby.

Though different countries require different qualifications and have different resources, the end goal is the same. To decrease neonatal mortality rates and to provide beneficial and life-saving care. Studies are constantly being done around the globe comparing and trying to understand neonatal mortality rates in different regions. Due to more recent funding to provide life-saving methods and more time and money for data analysis, the global neonatal mortality rate has decreased by nearly 51 percent between the years of 1990 and 2017. Efforts made by researchers and neonatal nurses around the globe are continuing daily to decrease mortality rates every year.

== Academy of Neonatal Nursing ==
The Academy of Neonatal Nursing was founded in 2001 and serves as a professional organization for neonatal nurses. Nurses who belong to the organization have the ability to locate continued education, apply for scholarships and awards, and receive other benefits. They can also receive the academy's healthcare journal, Neonatal Network.

== Apgar scoring ==
All nurses working in a birthing center have an important role in assessing the newborn immediately after birth. The assessment of the neonate's appearance (color), pulse (heart rate), grimace (in response to unpleasant stimuli such as bulb suctioning the pharynx), activity (muscle tone and/or movement), and respiratory effort via the Apgar scoring system is essential to guide the baby's care (see Understanding the Apgar scoring system). The nurse is often directly responsible for assigning the Apgar scores at 1 and 5 minutes of life. Each of the five assessment areas is given a score of 0, 1, or 2. The maximum score possible is 10. Scores of 7 or above are considered normal for full-term newborns. If the total score is below 7, or any area is scored 0 at 5 minutes of life, resuscitation efforts and scoring should continue every 5 minutes until 20 minutes of life. At 10 minutes neonates with an Apgar score of 3 or lower are at risk of having neurological dysfunctions and cerebral palsy in the future although there is no guarantee. Despite how every individual's case varies; as time goes by with the score not improving the risk becomes higher. However, there are numerous other factors to take into consideration when determining future complications, an Apgar score cannot do it alone.

Beyond assessing the five components that make up the Apgar score, it's essential to understand its meaning. The Apgar score assigned at 1 minute of life reflects how the fetus tolerated the in utero environment and/or the labor and delivery process. All subsequent Apgar scores reflect the newborn's response to interventions during the transition from intrauterine to extra-uterine life. There are, however, multiple different factors that can impact the Apgar score which include anesthesia, gestational age and initial lower oxygen. These nursing interventions include keeping the baby warm, stimulating the baby to breathe, giving breaths to the baby who isn't breathing well, and performing chest compression if needed.
