= Donna M. Fick =

American nurse

Donna Marie Fick is an American nurse.

She obtained a bachelor's degree in nursing science at Berea College before earning a master's degree from the University of Cincinnati. Subsequently, Fick completed a doctorate at the University of California, San Francisco. She is the Elouise Ross Eberly Professor of Nursing at Pennsylvania State University and editor of the Journal of Gerontological Nursing.
