= Journal of Gerontological Nursing =

- Discipline: Nursing
- Language: English
- Edited by: Donna M. Fick

Publication details
- History: 1975–present
- Publisher: Slack
- Frequency: Monthly
- Open access: Hybrid
- Impact factor: 0.752 (2017)

Standard abbreviations
- ISO 4: J. Gerontol. Nurs.

Indexing
- ISSN: 0098-9134 (print); 1938-243X (web)
- OCLC no.: 02243369

Links
- Journal homepage; Online access; Online archive

The Journal of Gerontological Nursing is a monthly peer-reviewed nursing journal covering gerontological nursing. It was established in 1975 and is published by Slack.

== History ==
The journal was established as a bimonthly journal in 1975 with Edna M. Stilwell as founding editor-in-chief. She served until 1997, when she was succeeded by Kathleen C. Buckwalter. Buckwalter continued until 2011, when she was replaced by the current editor, Donna M. Fick (Pennsylvania State University).

In 1980, the journal increased its publication frequency from six issues per year to 12.

== Abstracting and indexing ==
The journal is abstracted and indexed in:

- CINAHL
- Current Contents/Clinical Medicine
- Current Contents/Social & Behavioral Sciences
- EBSCO databases
- Embase
- MEDLINE/PubMed
- ProQuest databases
- Science Citation Index Expanded
- Scopus
- Social Sciences Citation Index

According to the Journal Citation Reports, the journal has a 2017 impact factor of 0.752.

== See also ==
- List of nursing journals
