= Machiavelli as a dramatist =

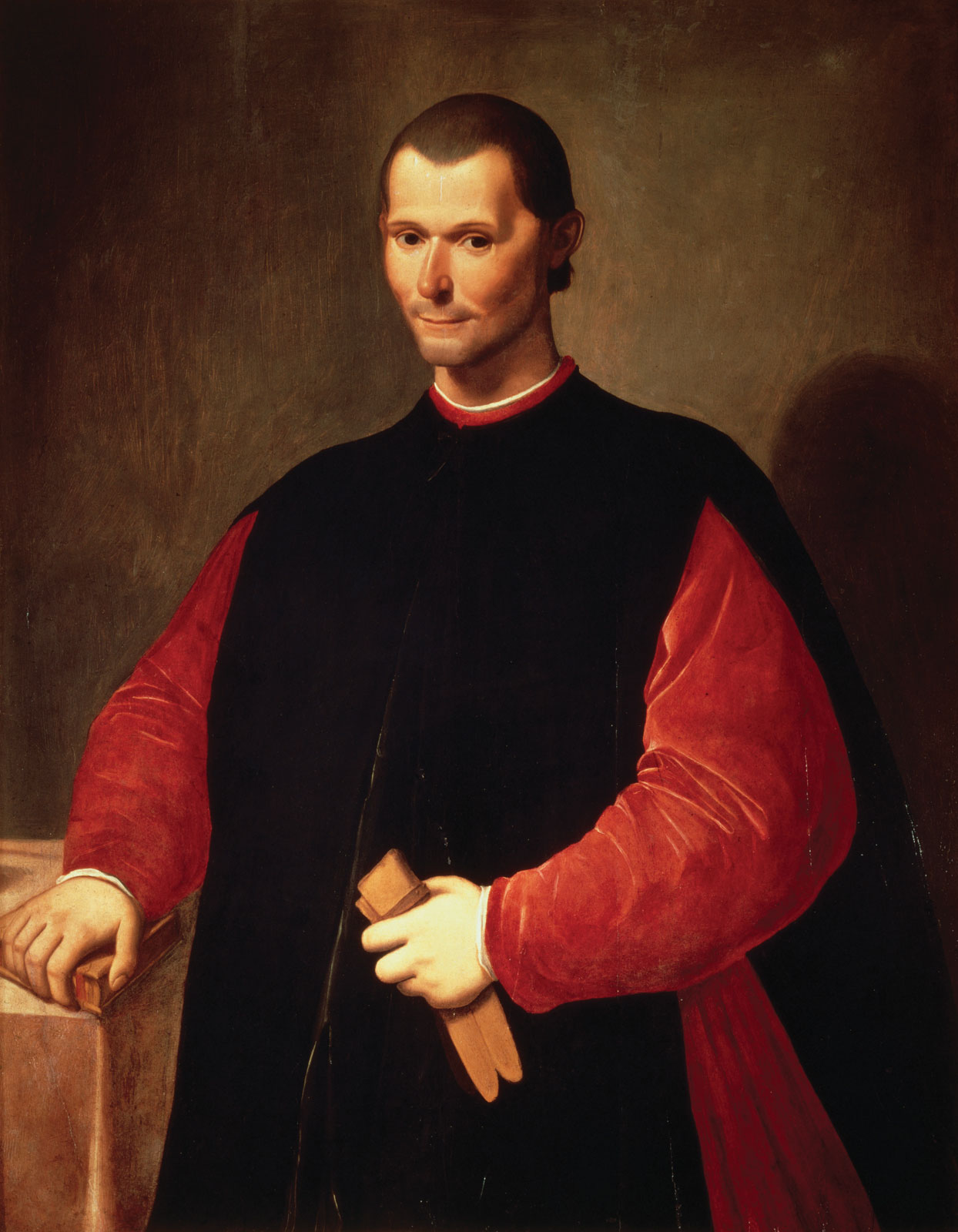
Portrait of Machiavelli by Santi di Tito

Niccolò Machiavelli, though widely known as a political philosopher and historian, also wrote works of fiction throughout his life. He wrote several dramas and one novella.

== The Mandrake (La Mandragola) ==
La Mandragola follows the story of a husband, Messer Nicia, who wants to have a child, yet is infertile. His wife, Lucrezia, can have children, but the only way she is going to get pregnant is through another man. This ties in the story of Callimaco, who is attracted to Lucrezia though she is married. The play ends with Messer Nicia obtaining the child he wishes, and Lucrezia and Callimaco consummating their relationship.

In Mandragola there is the classic old husband, youthful wife, competent charlatan and foraging assistant. But Machiavelli also uses Commedia Erudita (learned comedy) to complicate his script by referencing ancient, virtuous, pedagogical texts. The characters are named from Greek etymologies and the storyline's action is resolved in a day's time without much change of scenery.

== Andria ==
Andria is the first play written by Niccolò Machiavelli, published in the period 1517–1520. It is a translation of a play written by the Latin comedy writer Terence, who had originally taken it from the Greek dramatist Menander. It is one of the examples of Machiavelli as a comedy writer, along with The Mandrake and the Clizia. The play has been considered by some scholars semi-autobiographical.

== Clizia ==
Clizia is a comedy by the Italian Renaissance political scientist and writer Niccolò Machiavelli, written in 1525. The work is based upon a classical play by Plautus, called Casina.

The plot centres on a lecherous Florentine named Nicomaco who becomes attracted to an orphan girl he has raised since childhood. Nicomaco's son is also interested in the girl and wishes to marry her, but both men are manipulated by the matriarch of the family.

== The Golden Ass ==
L'asino (also called L'asino d'oro; English: The Golden Ass) is an unfinished satirical poem of eight cantos written by the Italian political scientist and writer Niccolò Machiavelli in 1517. A modernized version of Apuleius' The Golden Ass (rather than a translation of it), it is written in terza rima. It also concerns the theme of metamorphosis, and contains grotesque and allegorical episodes.

In the poem, the author meets a beautiful herdswoman surrounded by Circe's herd of beasts (Canto 2). After spending a night of love with him, she explains the characteristics of the animals in her charge: the lions are the brave, the bears are the violent, the wolves are those forever dissatisfied, and so on (Canto 6). In Canto 7 he is introduced to those who experience frustration: a cat that has allowed its prey to escape; an agitated dragon; a fox constantly on the look-out for traps; a dog that bays the moon; Aesop's lion in love that allowed himself to be deprived of his teeth and claws. There are also emblematic satirical portraits of various Florentine personalities. In the eighth and last canto he has a conversation with a pig that, like the Gryllus of Plutarch's Moralia, does not want to be changed back and condemns human greed, cruelty and conceit.

== Belfagor arcidiavolo (novella) ==
Belfagor arcidiavolo ("Belfagor the archdaemon") is a novella by Niccolò Machiavelli, written between 1518 and 1527, and first published with his collected works in 1549. The novella is also known as La favola di Belfagor Arcidiavolo ("The fable of Belfagor the archdaemon") and Il demonio che prese moglie ("The demon who took a wife"). Machiavelli's tale appeared in an abbreviated version published by Giovanni Brevio in 1545. Giovanni Francesco Straparola included his own version as the fourth story of the second night in his Le piacevoli notti (1557).

The "devil takes a wife" story influenced several English works: a version of it occurs in the conclusion of Rich His Farewell to Military Profession (1581) by Barnabe Rich. The popular play Grim the Collier of Croydon (published 1662) shows Machiavelli's influence. An English translation of Machiavelli's work was published in London in 1647 as The Devil a Married Man: or The Devil Hath Met with His Match. This was adapted into a play called The Devil and the Parliament (1648), later followed by Belphegor, or The Marriage of the Devil (1691) by John Wilson. William Makepeace Thackeray produced his own version of the tale in the nineteenth century.

The tale was adapted for the 1923 opera Belfagor by Ottorino Respighi. The Belfagor fable was the basis of a poem by Luigi Pirandello. The Romanian writer and satirist Ion Luca Caragiale wrote a version of the story: in Kir Ianulea, the demon takes the human form of a Greek merchant who arrives in Bucharest. The plot retains similarities with the original, with the author even mentioning Machiavelli's story.

== Allegory to his political thought ==
There have been much discussion about how his plays are used as a vehicle to display his political philosophy. Mansfield believes that it is related to a general theme of Machiavelli's, that out of evil may come good. Machiavelli, having lost the one vocation he understood, turned to writing, the closest thing to being in office he could now experience. In his writing he drew from his years of experience and understanding of the working of a successful "prince." The Prince, published in 1513, was a how-to book on securing and maintaining political power. According to historian Leo Strauss, Machiavelli did not censor his methods and was honest in his political advice, earning him an infamous reputation.

Friar Timoteo maintains a personal justification for his actions, blatantly disregarding the shame of his decisions for the financial benefits of the deal. In this way, Friar Timoteo is being self-deceptive. He swears by his innocence, with the rationale that sin is contingent on the presence of bad intentions in committing an act. He concludes that since he has ‘good’ intentions, he is therefore free of sin.

Frate Timoteo's character is dramatic because he undermines the expectations that both the audience and the theatrical characters have for him. He tricks the audience with the irony of his character; his familiar title ‘friar’ leads the audience to assume that he will act a certain way, but in reality he acts contrarily to those assumptions. In the play, Friar Timoteo takes advantage of Lucrezia's trust in his dependability, and leads Lucrezia to believe that his opinion of the plan is genuine and valid.

Some theorize that Callimaco is Machiavelli's described leader in The Prince as he follows what is natural to man, to rule, to attain things, and to consolidate power through scheming social and political structures. Just as the passion to rule is common in man, it is an allegory to Callimaco's sexual conquest of Lucrezia. Some argue against this theory, revealing that seduction is not simply a symbol for conspiracy, but that "seduction is seduction to Machiavelli" who believes the two are "virtually interchangeable phenomena".

In approaching Mandragola through the political analysis, Lucrezia has been viewed as the "Italy" to be conquered. Her defeat is generally viewed as the fall of a virtuous rule by corrupt means or the upheaval of an ignorant reign to ensure a more stable order. As a virtuous woman, Lucrezia surrenders her virtue not to the charming Callimaco but to the treachery of Timoteo, the corrupt friar, and the stupidity of her husband. Being so, she has the same name as the wife of Collatinus, the man who, with Brutus, helped defeat the Tarquin, thus founding the republic in Rome.
