= The Second Decade =

The Second Decade may refer to:

- The Second Decade (1993–2003) - An album by Michael W. Smith.
- The Second Decade (poem) - A 1509 poem by Niccolò Machiavelli.
