= Christopher Lynch =

Christopher Lynch may refer to:

- Christopher Lynch (businessman) (born 1953), Australian rules footballer and businessman
- Christopher P. Lynch (born 1963), American businessman
- Christopher Lynch (mayor), mayor of Galway (1601–1602)
- Christopher Lynch (political scientist) (born 1963), political scientist and theorist
- Christopher B-Lynch (born 1947), obstetrician and gynaecological surgeon
- Chris Lynch (born 1962), American children's writer
