= Casina (disambiguation) =

Casina is an Italian municipality

Casina may also refer to:

- Casina (architecture), an architectural form
- Casina (play), a play by Plautus
