= Giles Constable =

British church historian and medievalist (1929–2021)

Giles Constable FBA
- Born: 1 June 1929; London, England
- Died: 17 January 2021 (aged 91); Princeton, New Jersey, U.S.
- Occupation: Medievalist

Academic background
- Education: Harvard University (AB, 1950; PhD, 1957)

Academic work
- Discipline: History
- Sub-discipline: Medieval history; Byzantine history
- Institutions: Harvard University (1958–1984); Institute for Advanced Study (1985–2003)
- Notable students: John Boswell

Giles Constable FBA (1 June 1929 – 17 January 2021) was an English historian and medievalist. Constable was mainly interested in the religion and culture of the 11th and 12th centuries, in particular the abbey of Cluny and its abbot Peter the Venerable.

== Early life and education ==
Constable was born in London, England, the son of the art historian William George Constable and Olivia Roberts. He received his A.B. in 1950 and his Ph.D. in 1957 from Harvard University.

== Career ==
Constable taught at the University of Iowa from 1955 to 1958 and at Harvard University from 1958 to 1984. He was the Henry Charles Lea-Professor of Medieval History at Harvard University from 1966 to 1977. From 1977 to 1984 he was Director of the Dumbarton Oaks Research Library. He joined the faculty of the Institute for Advanced Study as a Medieval History Professor in the School of Historical Studies in 1985 and became professor emeritus in 2003.

A vigorous explorer of medieval religious and intellectual history, Constable was the author or editor of more than twenty books on medieval religious and intellectual history. His most influential works, centered around the religious and cultural history of the twelfth century, illuminated the origins of monastic tithes, Peter the Venerable, the people and power of the Byzantine Empire, medieval religious and social thought, the reformation of the twelfth century, twelfth-century crusading, and the history of Cluny.

He died in Princeton, New Jersey, aged 91.

== Honours ==
Constable was a Fellow of the Medieval Academy of America, the American Historical Association, the American Philosophical Society, the Académie des Inscriptions et Belles-Lettres, the Bavarian Academy of Sciences, the Bavarian Academy of Sciences, the British Academy, the Royal Historical Society, the Instituto Lombardo, the Accademia di Scienze e Lettere, and the Accademia Nazionale dei Lincei. He was a member of the scientific council of the Revue d'Histoire Ecclésiastique.

== Bibliography ==
- The Abbey of Cluny : A Collection of Essays to Mark the Eleven-Hundredth Anniversary Of Its Foundation (2010), ISBN 3643107773
- Three Treatises from Bec on the Nature of Monastic Life (2008), ISBN 1442689420
- The Rothschilds and the Gold Rush: Benjamin Davidson and Heinrich Schliemann in California, 1851-52 (2005), ISBN 9781606180549
- Sacrilege and Redemption in Renaissance Florence: The Case of Antonio Rinaldeschi, co-auth. William J. Connell (2005; 2008), ISBN 9780772720405
- Cluny from The Tenth to the Twelfth Centuries : Further Studies (2000), ISBN 0860788156
- The Reformation of the Twelfth Century (1996), ISBN 0521305144
- Three Studies in Medieval Religious and Social Thought (1995), ISBN 0585039704
- Monks, Hermits, and Crusaders in Medieval Europe (1988), ISBN 0860782212
- Culture and Spirituality in Medieval Europe (1988), ISBN 0860786099
- Medieval Monasticism : A Select Bibliography (1976), ISBN 0802022006
- Letters and Letter-Collections (1976), OCLC 4641316
- The Letters of Peter the Venerable (1967), OCLC 6710086
- Monastic Tithes : From Their Origins to the Twelfth Century (1964), OCLC 21932950
