= On the Method of Dealing with the Rebellious Peoples of Valdichiana =

1503 work by Niccolò Machiavelli

On the method of dealing with the Rebellious Peoples of Valdichiana (Italian: Del modo di trattare i popoli della Valdichiana ribellati) is a 1503 work by Niccolò Machiavelli.

A short excerpt in English may be found in Allan Gilbert's Machiavelli Volume One.

At the onset of Machiavelli's secretarial career, the territories under Florentine control were in active sedition, and he personally witnessed uprisings erupt in Pistoia, Arezzo, and the Valdichiana region. In 1503, one year after his missions to Cesare Borgia, Machiavelli wrote a short work, Del modo di trattare i sudditi della Valdichiana ribellati (On the Way to Deal with the Rebel Subjects of the Valdichiana). He wrote about this experience in the treatise, and it is said by Corrado Vivanti to anticipate his later Discourses in structure and approach. This work draws directly from a passage in Livy to recommend that Florence adopt a course of action modeled on the conduct of the Roman Republic.

In this work, he contrasts the errors of the Republic of Florence with the wisdom of the Ancient Romans. Machiavelli declares that when dealing with rebellious peoples, such as in Valdichiana, the ruler must either placate them or eliminate them. Scholars have taken interest in this piece primarily because it marks the earliest instance of political commentary within Machiavelli's overall body of work.

Machiavelli also witnessed the bloody vengeance taken by Borgia on his mutinous captains at the town of Sinigaglia (December 31, 1502), later writing a famous account. In much of his early writings, Machiavelli argues that “one should not offend a prince and later put faith in him.”
