= Discourse About the Provision of Money =

Book by Niccolò Machiavelli

Discourse About the Provision of Money (Italian: Discorso sopra la provisione del danaro) is a 1502 book by Italian political scientist and writer Niccolò Machiavelli.
