= Clizia =

1525 comedy by Niccolò Machiavelli

Clizia is a comedy by the Italian Renaissance political scientist and writer Niccolò Machiavelli, written in 1525. The work is based upon a classical play by Plautus, called Casina.

== Plot ==
The plot centres on a lecherous Florentine named Nicomaco who becomes attracted to an orphan girl he has raised since childhood. Nicomaco's son is also interested in the girl and wishes to marry her, but both men are manipulated by the matriarch of the family.
