= William J. Connell (historian) =

American historian

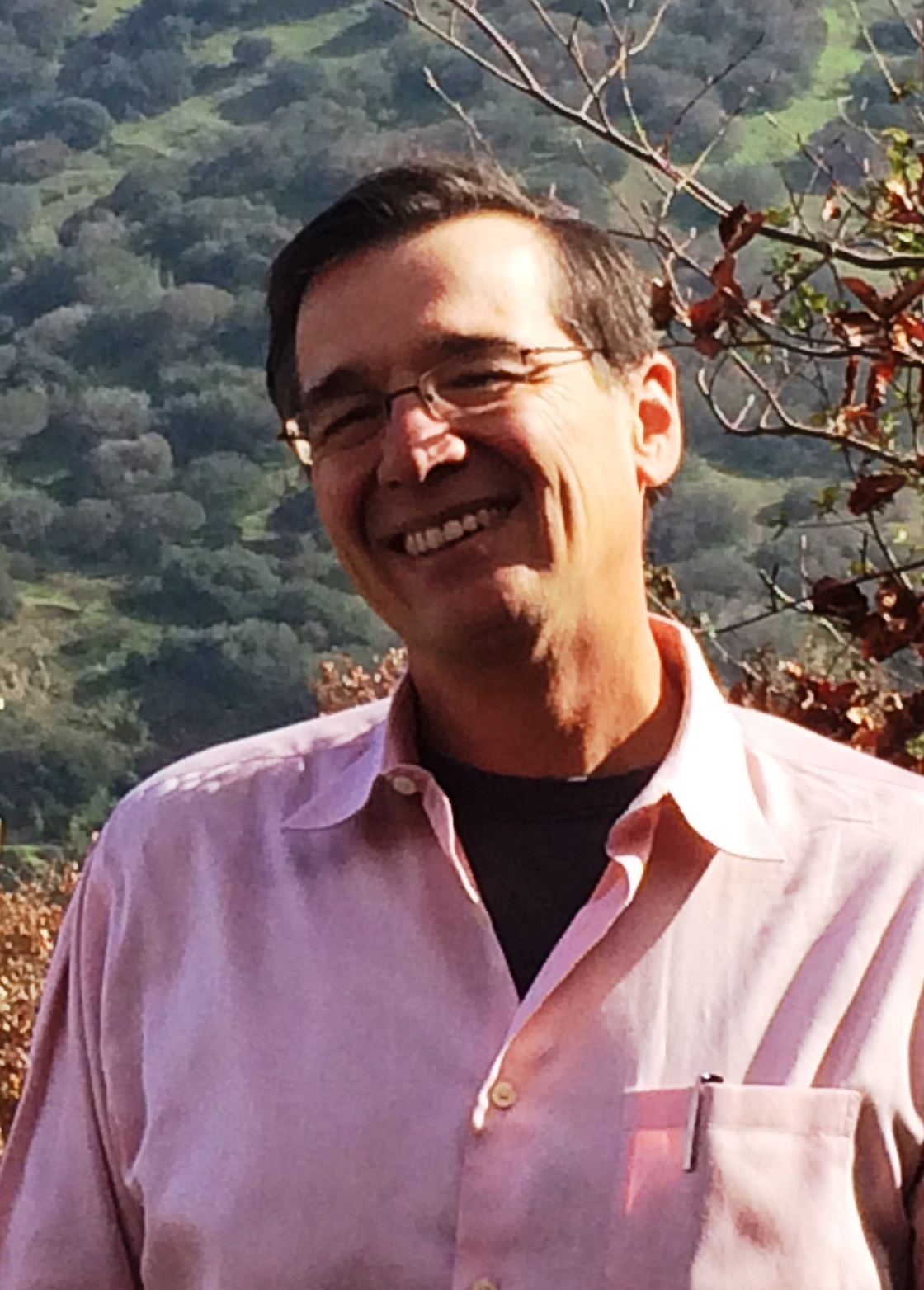
- Connell in Santiago, Chile, 2014
- Born: William Joe Connell; July 22, 1958 (age 68); New York City, U.S.
- Education: B.A. Yale; Ph.D. UC Berkeley
- Employer: Seton Hall University

William John Connell (born July 22, 1958) is an American historian and holder of the Joseph M. and Geraldine C. La Motta Chair in Italian Studies at Seton Hall University. He is a leading specialist in Italian history, Early Modern European history and the history of Italian Americans. He also writes broadly on other topics. In 2019 he was named an Andrew Carnegie Fellow.

== Early life and education ==
Connell was educated at the Trinity School (New York City), Bronxville High School, and Yale University, where he belonged to Saybrook College and the Manuscript Society and received his B.A. in 1980 summa cum laude. After an internship with U.S. Senator Lowell Weicker and a job as a gardener on the island of Elba, he worked in banking for the Manufacturers Hanover Trust Company and then as research assistant for columnist Joseph Alsop before entering graduate school in History at the University of California, Berkeley, where he received his Ph.D. in 1989.

== Career ==
Connell taught history at Reed College in Portland, OR, and at Rutgers University before moving to Seton Hall University in 1998. From 2003 to 2007 he was Founding Director of the Charles and Joan Alberto Italian Studies Institute. He has been a Fulbright Scholar to Italy, an I Tatti Fellow, a Member of the Institute for Advanced Study, Princeton and a Juror for the Rome Prize of the American Academy in Rome. From 1992 to 2020 he was Secretary of the Journal of the History of Ideas and he remains active on the Editorial Board. He is a Corresponding Fellow of the Deputazione di Storia Patria per la Toscana and the Società Pistoiese di Storia Patria, and a member of the Grolier Club of New York City. From 2002 to 2005, and again in 2009-2010, he served on the New Jersey Italian and Italian American Commission as a gubernatorial appointee. He was co-chair of the Trustees and chair of the Academic Advisors of the Italian American Heritage Institute at Rutgers University from 2002 to 2005. In 2011 he received the Presidential Award of the Columbian Foundation. His NPR broadcast, "Machiavelli Faces Unemployment," won the Listener Choice Award as the favorite "Academic Minute" of 2011-2012. In 2013 The Irish Voice named him to its Education 100—a list of top US educators of Irish ancestry. Seton Hall University awarded him its Granato Italian Culture Medal in 2016. UNICO National honored Connell with its Joseph Coccia, Jr. Heritage, Culture and Language Award in 2022. In 2023 he began serving as a Commissioner on the Hunterdon County (New Jersey) Cultural and Heritage Commission.

== Work ==
An interest in the territory that surrounded and supported the city of Florence during the Renaissance resulted in his book, La città dei crucci: fazioni e clientele in uno stato repubblicano del ʼ400, a study of the social networks underpinning the factionalism of republican Florence and her subject city of Pistoia. His study of the Lombard nobleman Gaspare Pallavicino resulted in a new reading of the narrative framework and the discussion of the female courtier in Baldassarre Castiglione's Book of the Courtier. Sacrilege and Redemption in Renaissance Florence (2005; rev. 2d ed. 2008), co-authored with Giles Constable, recounts the case of a man who was hanged for throwing dung at a painting of the Virgin Mary and has been published in Italian, Spanish, Russian, Romanian and Farsi translations.

Connell’s archival research on the life and career of Niccolò Machiavelli resulted in a widely praised translation of The Prince (2005, rev. 2d ed. 2016) and several important essays. In 2013 Connell solved a longstanding philological problem, previously considered a puzzle "awaiting its Rosetta Stone," by showing that Machiavelli completed The Prince in its final version in the spring of 1515. His essays were collected in the Italian volume Machiavelli nel Rinascimento italiano (2015). In 2016, on the occasion of the 500th anniversary of the publication of Utopia by Thomas More, he demonstrated connections between Machiavelli and the circle around More and Erasmus.

Connell has contributed to the revitalization of Italian American studies. The Routledge History of Italian Americans, which he co-edited in 2018 with Stanislao G. Pugliese, is the first scholarly history of the five centuries of the experience of Italians in America. The book, published both in English and Italian, received the 75th Anniversary Award of the US-Italy Fulbright Commission in 2023.

In research on Italian explorers in the early Atlantic World, including Christopher Columbus, Connell explains that these navigators happened to be Italian because declining commercial prospects in the eastern Mediterranean (a consequence of Ottoman conquests) meant that Italian financiers were willing to invest in the first risky European expeditions into the Atlantic.

In recent years Connell's research has focused on the Renaissance revolution in historical thought and on connections between northern and southern Europe in the Early Modern period.

In 2021 he organized the first academic conference of the Philip Roth Personal Library in the Newark Public Library. The conference featured the first public airing of the preserved audio tape of a famous symposium held at Yeshiva University in 1962 featuring Philip Roth, Ralph Ellison and Pietro di Donato. The question they addressed was whether minority writers of fiction face a possible conflict of loyalties when in their work they develop characters who belong to their own minorities.

A manuscript he discovered in an antique shop in Amalfi in 2018 and published in 2023 is the only known copy of the first history of the Church written by a layman. In its conclusion,Della Republica Ecclesiastica, written by the important humanist Donato Giannotti in 1541, proposed reforming the Catholic Church as a republic, with the Pope becoming a ceremonial figure, all administration passing to the College of Cardinals, and bishops to be elected by the people and clergy of each diocese.

Connell has lectured at the Institute for Universal History of the Russian Academy of Sciences in Moscow, the Scuola Normale Superiore in Pisa, and the Fondazione Luigi Firpo in Turin. In 2011 he was an accreditation visitor at King Abdulaziz University in Jeddah, Saudi Arabia. He serves on the editorial boards of 13 academic journals and monograph series, and he has written occasional pieces and reviews for the Times Literary Supplement, Washington Post, Wall Street Journal, New York Daily News, The American Scholar, Clarín (Argentina) and Timpul (Romania).

== Personal ==
Connell is the son of William F. Connell, an artist, of Great Barrington, Massachusetts, and Marilyn Moore, an editor and actress, of New York City. He is married to Nikki Shepardson, a historian of Christianity, with whom he has two daughters. A first marriage ended in divorce.

Connell is a resident of Clinton, New Jersey.

== Books ==
- Connell, William J. (2000). La città dei crucci: fazioni e clientele in uno stato repubblicano del '400. Florence: Nuova Toscana Editrice. ISBN 88-87263-10-8.
- Connell, William J. (co-ed.); Andrea Zorzi (2000). Florentine Tuscany: Structures and Practices of Power. Cambridge: Cambridge University Press. ISBN 978-0-521-54800-7. Italian edition (2001).
- Connell, William J., ed. (2002). Society and Individual in Renaissance Florence. Berkeley and Los Angeles: University of California Press. ISBN 0-520-23254-2.
- Connell, William J. (ed. and trans.) (2005). Niccolò Machiavelli: The Prince with Related Documents. Boston: Bedford / St. Martins. ISBN 978-1-319-04892-1. Revised second ed. (2016).
- Connell, William J.; Giles Constable (2005). Sacrilege and Redemption in Renaissance Florence: The Case of Antonio Rinaldeschi. Toronto: Centre for Reformation and Renaissance Studies, Victoria U - U. of Toronto. ISBN 978-0772720405. Revised second ed. (2008). Italian edition (2006). Russian edition (2010). Romanian edition (2011). Farsi edition (2018). Spanish edition (2019).
- Connell, William J. (2007). Come ho imparato l'italiano. Portoferraio (Elba): Biblioteca Comunale Foresiana. ISBN 978-0-9817178-1-4.
- Connell, William J. (co-ed.); Fred Gardaphé (2010). Anti-Italianism: Essays on a Prejudice. New York: Palgrave Macmillan. ISBN 978-0-230-10830-1. Italian edition (2019).
- Connell, William J. (historical commentary) (2011). Giannozzo Manetti: Historia Pistoriensis. Florence: SISMEL-Edizioni del Galluzzo. ISBN 978-88-8450-442-5. Italian translation, new edition (2014).
- Connell, William J. (2014). Machiavelli şi Renaşterea italiană. Studii. Iaşi: Institutul European. ISBN 978-606-24-0059-0. Selected essays in Romanian.
- Connell, William J. (2015). Machiavelli nel Rinascimento italiano. Milan: FrancoAngeli. ISBN 978-88-917-2503-5. Selected essays in Italian.
- Connell, William J. (co-ed.); Stanislao G. Pugliese (2018). The Routledge History of Italian Americans. New York: Routledge. ISBN 9780415835831. Italian edition (2019).
- Connell, William J. (ed.) (2023). Donato Giannotti: Della Republica Ecclesiastica. Turin: Einaudi. ISBN 9788806259976.
