= Report on the state of Germany =

Work by Niccolò Machiavelli

Report on the State of Germany (Italian: Rapporto delle cose dell' Alemagna) was a 1508 work by Niccolò Machiavelli. Ridolfi states in The Life of Niccolò Machiavelli that the report was written a day after Machiavelli's return to Florence and that this report was later worked into Ritrato dell cose della Francia e dell'Alemagna.
