= Life of Castruccio Castracani =

Work by Niccolò Machiavelli

The Life of Castruccio Castracani (Italian: Vita di Castruccio Castracani) is a short work by Niccolò Machiavelli. It is made in the form of a short biographical account of the life of the medieval Tuscan condottiere, Castruccio Castracani, who lived in and ruled Lucca.

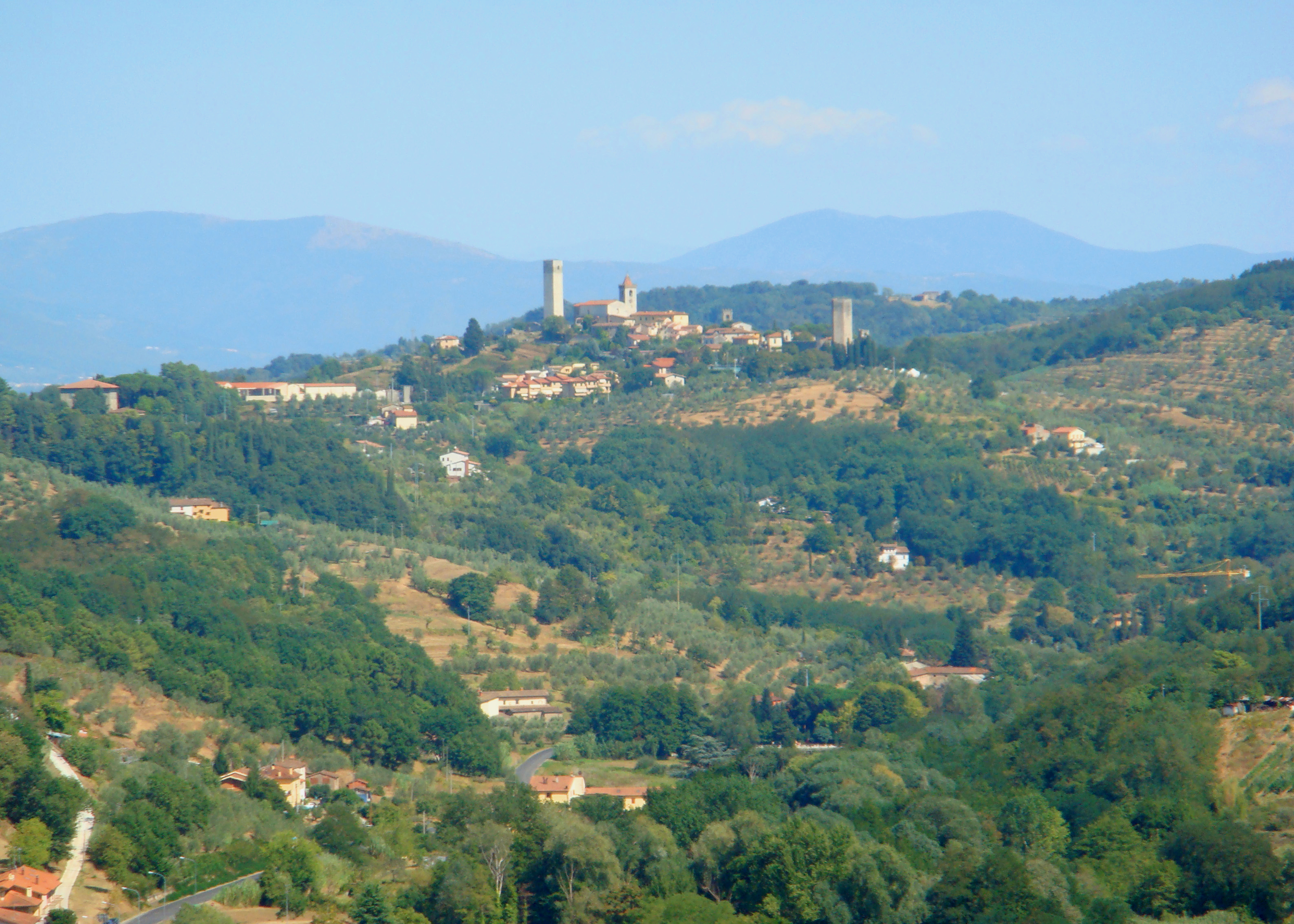
A view of Serravalle Pistoiese, which is set upon a hill with some sides being quite steep. Machiavelli describes an attack by the Luccan forces of Castracani on the ridge of this town, that successfully caught Florentine forces by surprise.

The account is thought to have been written during a visit to Lucca in 1520. It was dedicated to Zanobi Buondelmonti and Luigi Alamanni. The former was also one of the two men to whom the Discourses on Livy was dedicated. Both, along with Machiavelli, are considered members of the group of thinkers that frequented the Orti Oricellari gardens.

Despite being in the form of a biography the sayings of Castracani are generally considered to have been fabricated by Machiavelli. It is therefore sometimes compared to his more well-known works including The Prince, the Discourses on Livy, and the Art of War.

A distinct section of sayings appears at the end of the work, after Castracani's life has ended. Leo Strauss, in 1958, analyzed the various speeches attributed to Castracani in this work and found that they had mostly come from classical Roman and Greek sources, including most significantly several that had been attributed to Democritus by Diogenes Laërtius.

Machiavelli treats Castracani as a person whose aim was to unite Tuscany, but who failed because, as Machiavelli has the dying Castracani tell his heir "Fortune, who is admitted to be arbiter of all human things, did not give me so much judgement that I could early understand her, nor so much time that I could overcome her". This proposal that leaders can overcome the arbiter of all things is a common theme in Machiavelli's better known political works such as The Prince.

By treating Castracani as a founder, almost, of a new state, Machiavelli used him as an example of the most important type of prince according to his other writings. In fact Machiavelli opens with a passage that treats prophets as the highest type of secular prince.

...the larger part, of those who in this world have done very great things, and who have been excellent among the men of their era, have in their birth and origin been humble and obscure, or at least have been beyond all measure afflicted by Fortune. Because all of them either have been exposed to wild beasts or have had fathers so humble that, being ashamed of them, they have made themselves out sons of Jove or some other god. Who these are, since many of them are known to everybody, would be boring to repeat and little acceptable to readers... Machiavelli (1958:533)

Castracani was found as a baby left in a field, Machiavelli reports.

Machiavelli ends by touching upon another theme found in his other works, which is that Italy in his time was weak.

...because when living he was inferior neither to Philip of Macedon, Alexander's father, nor to Scipio of Rome, he died at the age of both; without doubt he would have surpassed both if instead of Lucca he had had for his native country Macedonia or Rome. Machiavelli (1958:559)
