= Bernardo di Niccolò Machiavelli =

Father of Niccolò Machiavelli

Bernardo di Niccolò Machiavelli (between 1426 and 1429 – 1500) was a citizen of Florence and father to Niccolò Machiavelli. Although he was a Doctor of Law (hence, his title of Messer), he was heavily in debt, and was one of the Machiavelli family's poorest members. Bernardo was born illegitimately and thus could not become a full citizen of Florence, nor could he participate in Florentine politics. This affected his son Niccolò as well, who himself could not obtain full citizenship rights. He is known independently for his diary or Libro di Ricordi, chronicling the years 1474–1487. The pages, housed in the Biblioteca Riccardiana in Florence, serve as a look into the life and culture during this period and provide the only reliable information on his famous son's early youth. Bernardo Machiavelli was married to Bartolommea di Stefano Nelli. They had four children: Primavera, Margherita, Niccolò (the author of The Prince) and Totto.

== Bibliography ==
- Catherine Atkinson: Debts, Dowries, Donkeys. The Diary of Niccolò Machiavelli’s Father, Messer Bernardo, in Quattrocento Florence, Frankfurt am Main 2002, ISBN 3-631-38351-7
- Cesare Olschki, Hrsg.: Bernardo Machiavelli, Libro di Ricordi, Florenz 1954.
