= Christopher Lynch (political scientist) =

- Awards: Olin Faculty Fellow

Academic background
- Education: St. John's College University of Chicago

Academic work
- Main interests: Political theory Machiavelli

Christopher Lynch (born 1963) is a political scientist and theorist who focuses his research on Machiavelli. Lynch has published three books and numerous articles in academic journals.

== Publications ==
Lynch's Machiavelli on War treats war and politics in all of Machiavelli's writings, from memoranda and personal letters, to poetry, to his famous Prince and Discourses on Livy. Previously, Lynch translated, edited, and provided an introduction to Niccolò Machiavelli's Art of War. While staying true to the original text, Lynch was also able to translate it into modern English. He also provided an extensive interpretive essay.

Lynch coedited Principle and Prudence in Western Political Thought, a collection of essays published in 2016.

== Academic life ==
At Boston College, Lynch was a Bradley Postdoctoral Fellow. He taught at the University of Dallas Rome campus. In 2005, he participated in ISI/Jack Miller Center’s Lehrman Summer Institute. In 2006, he was Faculty Fellow at the Foundation for Defense of Democracies. Between 2006 and 2007, Lynch was Senior Advisor at the United States Department of State. And in 2011, he was a faculty member on the Hertog Political Studies Program in Washington, D.C. Lynch was granted the Olin Faculty Fellowship to support his work on a new book about Machiavelli's thoughts on war. Additionally, on the 500th anniversary of the writing of Machiavelli's The Prince, Lynch was discussant in the "Machiavelli's The Prince at 500: Rereading The Prince in the 21st Century" Panel at the 2013 American Political Science Association (APSA) Annual Meeting and Exhibition in Chicago, and he spoke at Harvard University on the question of whether Machiavelli is a philosopher. Lynch has been a part of workshops and seminars at Army War College, Naval War College, and National Defense University. Additionally, he has presented lectures at the Air Force Academy and the National War College. Lynch is Professor Emeritus at Carthage College and is currently Professor and Department Head of the Department of Political Science and Philosophy at Missouri State University.

== Education ==
Lynch received a Bachelor of Arts from St. John's College and his master's and doctorate from University of Chicago's Committee on Social Thought.

== Personal life ==
Lynch lives in Springfield, Missouri, with his wife, Kate. They have three grown children: Emily, Henry and Grace.
