= The Second Decade (poem) =

1509 poem by Niccolò Machiavelli

The Second Decade (Italian: Decennale secondo) is a poem by Italian Renaissance writer Niccolò Machiavelli. Published in 1509, it is an update to Machiavelli's earlier work The First Decade (Decennale Primo), published in 1504.
