= The Golden Ass (Machiavelli) =

Unfinished satirical poem by Niccolò Machiavelli

L'asino (also called L'asino d'oro; English: The Golden Ass) is an unfinished satirical poem of eight cantos written by the Italian political scientist and writer Niccolò Machiavelli in 1517. A modernized version of Apuleius' The Golden Ass (rather than a translation of it), it is written in terza rima. It also concerns the theme of metamorphosis, and contains grotesque and allegorical episodes.

In the poem, the author meets a beautiful herdswoman surrounded by Circe's herd of beasts (Canto 2). After spending a night of love with him, she explains the characteristics of the animals in her charge: the lions are the brave, the bears are the violent, the wolves are those forever dissatisfied, and so on (Canto 6). In Canto 7 he is introduced to those who experience frustration: a cat that has allowed its prey to escape; an agitated dragon; a fox constantly on the look-out for traps; a dog that bays the moon; Aesop's lion in love that allowed himself to be deprived of his teeth and claws. There are also emblematic satirical portraits of various Florentine personalities. In the eighth and last canto he has a conversation with a pig that, like the Gryllus of Plutarch's Moralia, does not want to be changed back and condemns human greed, cruelty and conceit.
