= Niccolò Machiavelli =

Florentine statesman, diplomat, and political theorist (1469–1527)

- Posthumous portrait by Santi di Tito, latter half of the 16th century
- Born: Niccolò di Bernardo dei Machiavelli; 3 May 1469; Florence, Republic of Florence
- Died: 21 June 1527 (aged 58); Florence, Republic of Florence
- Spouse: Marietta Corsini (m. 1501)
- Children: 7
- Father: Bernardo di Niccolò Machiavelli

Philosophical work
- Era: Renaissance philosophy
- Region: Western philosophy
- School: Classical realism; Republicanism
- Main interests: Politics and political philosophy, military theory, history
- Notable works: The Prince; Discourses on Livy
- Notable ideas: Classical realism, virtù, modern republicanism

Niccolò di Bernardo dei Machiavelli (Note: /ˈnɪkəloʊ ˌmækiəˈvɛli/ nik-ə-LOH MAK-ee-ə-VEL-ee, US also /- ˌmɑːk-/ - MAHK-; Italian: [nikkoˈlɔ mmakjaˈvɛlli]; also occasionally rendered in English as Nicholas Machiavel (/ˈmækiəvɛl/ MAK-ee-ə-vel, US also /ˈmɑːk-/ MAHK-).) (3 May 1469 – 21 June 1527) was a Florentine diplomat, author, philosopher, and historian who lived during the Italian Renaissance. He is best known for his political treatise The Prince (Il Principe), written around 1513 but not published until 1532, five years after his death. He has often been called the father of modern political philosophy and political science.

For many years he served as a senior official in the Florentine Republic with responsibilities in diplomatic and military affairs. He worked as secretary to the second chancery of the Republic of Florence from 1498 to 1512, when the Medici were out of power. He was expelled from his duties as a diplomat when the Medici retook power in Florence in 1512, and soon thereafter would be mistakenly suspected of treason, and sent into exile. A year later, he took up the life of a political writer.

After his death Machiavelli's name came to evoke unscrupulous acts of the sort he recommended in his most famous work, The Prince. In the treatise, Machiavelli stated that rulers will have to take on unsavory policies in the furtherance of their political society, in contradiction to classical political thought. He advised rulers to engage in evil when political necessity requires it, for example, stating that successful founders and reformers of governments should be excused for killing their political enemies. Machiavelli's Prince has been surrounded by controversy since it was published, with many commentators viewing The Prince as a manual that aims to teach would-be tyrants how they should seize authority and establish an absolute regime. Even into recent times, scholars such as Leo Strauss have restated the traditional opinion that Machiavelli was a "teacher of evil".

Even though Machiavelli has become most famous for his work on principalities, scholars also give attention to the exhortations in his other works of political philosophy. The Discourses on Livy (composed c. 1517) has been said to have paved the way for modern republicanism. His works were influential on later Enlightenment-era political authors such as Jean-Jacques Rousseau and James Harrington. Machiavelli's philosophical contributions have influenced generations of philosophers, academics and politicians, with many of them debating the nature of his ideas.

== Life ==
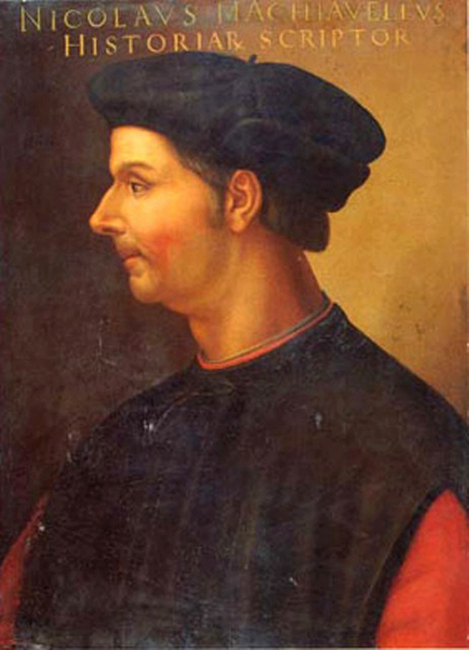
Oil painting of Machiavelli by Cristofano dell'Altissimo

Niccolò Machiavelli was born in Florence, Italy, the third child and first son of attorney Bernardo di Niccolò Machiavelli and his wife, Bartolomea di Stefano Nelli, on 3 May 1469. The Machiavelli family were a second-rate elite Florentine family in the late 13th to 14th centuries, and likely originated south of Florence near Giogoli and later became substantial landowners around Sant'Andrea in Percussina, possibly descending from minor feudal nobility in the Val di Pesa. Machiavelli's father, Bernardo, was born illegitimately and thus could not become a full citizen of Florence, nor could he participate in Florentine politics. This affected Niccolò as well, who himself could not obtain full citizenship rights. Not much is known about Machiavelli's early life, thus one of the main sources that historians rely on regarding his experiences during his childhood and adolescence exists in his father's diary, often referred to as Libro di Ricordi, found in the 20th century. His family was a significant influence on his life, and his father likely influenced Machiavelli with his later preference in adulthood for a republican form of government. There is not much known about Machiavelli's mother, as only few facts have been found about her life by historians. There are no surviving letters or written accounts that exist to describe her or her life.

Machiavelli was born and raised in a tumultuous era. Machiavelli was eight years old when a conspiracy by the Pazzi family was hatched which aimed to assassinate both Lorenzo and Giuliano de' Medici, the then-de facto rulers of Florence, in a church. Only Giuliano was killed, and the leaders of the conspiracy were arrested and hanged. Machiavelli witnessed the resulting violence of the failed plot. As a young man he listened, but was not swayed by, the lengthy sermons of Girolamo Savonarola. Machiavelli stated that Savonarola colored his "untruths" according to the situation. Machiavelli's civil service began shortly after Savonarola was burned at the stake for heresy.

Machiavelli was taught grammar, rhetoric, and Latin by his teacher, Paolo da Ronciglione. It is unknown whether Machiavelli knew Greek; Florence was at the time one of the centers of Greek scholarship in Europe. In 1494 Florence restored the republic, expelling the Medici family that had ruled Florence for some sixty years.

=== Diplomatic career ===
Shortly after the execution of Savonarola, Machiavelli was appointed to an office of the second chancery, a medieval writing office that put Machiavelli in charge of the production of official Florentine government documents. Shortly thereafter, he was also made the secretary of the Dieci di Libertà e Pace, the Florentine council responsible for diplomacy and warfare. His appointment remains a mystery to scholars as he was a very young man, 29 at the time, with no experience in law or public office.

Machiavelli was originally a middle rank civil servant after Savonarola's death, however, his duties and his position within the Florentine Republic would rise during Piero Soderini's tenure as gonfaloniere of the republic. He was important to Soderini's government, and this led many of Machiavelli's contemporaries to view him as a mere extension of Soderini's orders. This led to jealousy within many factions of the Florentine Republic, and Machiavelli was often the subject of much gossip by some of his colleagues. Because he was head of the Chancery of the Ten, this gave him a leading role in the government. He was dispatched to the courts of various powerful rulers and personally represent Florence during these excursions. Like other chancery officials, he was given the task of preparing documents, usually in the form of letters sent on behalf of the Signoria.

Machiavelli married Marietta Corsini in 1501. They had seven children, five sons and two daughters: Primerana, Bernardo, Lodovico, Guido, Piero, Baccina and Totto.

Machiavelli's first diplomatic missions occurred in 1499, where he was sent to the respective courts of Iacopo di Appiano in Piombino, and Caterina Sforza in Forlì. His first major mission was to France in order to placate King Louis XII, and to provide reasons for the failed Florentine assault at Pisa. During the French mission he met and had discussions with Georges d'Amboise, who was the cardinal of Rouen, an experience he later discuss in his political works.

Machiavelli's position as a secretary enabled him to witness firsthand the state-building methods of the Pope Alexander VI, and his son, Cesare Borgia. Machiavelli often wrote highly about Cesare, stating in one letter that "this lord is splendid and magnificent", and that his pursuit of glory he "knows neither danger or fatigue". Machiavelli personally witnessed the brutal retribution Cesare Borgia inflicted on his rebellious commanders, Oliverotto Euffreducci and Vitellozzo Vitelli in Sinigaglia on 31 December 1502, an event he famously chronicled in a political work, The Description. In many of his early writings, Machiavelli emphasized the danger of offending a ruler and then expecting to trust him afterward. In 1503, Machiavelli was dispatched to Rome to observe the papal conclave that ultimately selected Julius II, who was a bitter rival of the Borgia family, as pope, despite Cesare's support for his election. As Cesare's power waned, Machiavelli documented his downfall in his poem First Decennale.

Machiavelli was also a witness to Pandolfo Petrucci's consolidation of his rule in Siena, later noting in his works that he "governed his state more with those who were suspected of him than with others".

In the first decade of the 16th century, he carried out several diplomatic missions, most notably to the papacy in Rome. Florence sent him to Pistoia to pacify the leaders of two opposing factions which had broken into riots in 1501 and 1502; when this failed, the leaders were banished from the city, a recommendation which Machiavelli had disagreed with from the outset, and would later advise governments in similar situations to do the opposite. Machiavelli's official duties within the Florentine Republic, including his involvement in the disturbances of Pistoia and the rebellion of Arezzo, served as experiences that shaped his later intellectual development. Biographers noted that he advocated for firm punishment of rebellious cities, a stance consistent with his counsel in his later political treatises. These events, and the evident structural weaknesses of Florence's government compared to figures like Cesare Borgia, offered Machiavelli insights into political life. Though he wrote an official report, De rebus pistoriensibus, during this time, his later discourse Del modo di trattare i sudditi della Valdichiana ribellati was notable in that it aimed to combine historical knowledge of Rome's conduct with subject cities with the current political situation in Florence, and is considered his first mature, literary political work not driven by immediate bureaucratic necessity.

At the start of the 16th century, Machiavelli conceived of a militia for Florence, and he then began recruiting and creating it. He viewed that mercenary armies were inferior and instead preferred an army staffed with loyal, professional soldiers, a policy which he derived from observing antiquity. By February 1506 he was able to have four hundred farmers marching on parade, suited (including iron breastplates), and armed with lances and small firearms. Under his command, Florentine citizen-soldiers conquered Pisa in 1509. He was also tasked in gathering soldiers to aid Pope Julius' papal army in overthrowing the local lords of Perugia (Gian Paolo Baglioni) and Bologna (Giovanni Bentivoglio), noting first-hand Julius' audacious conduct.

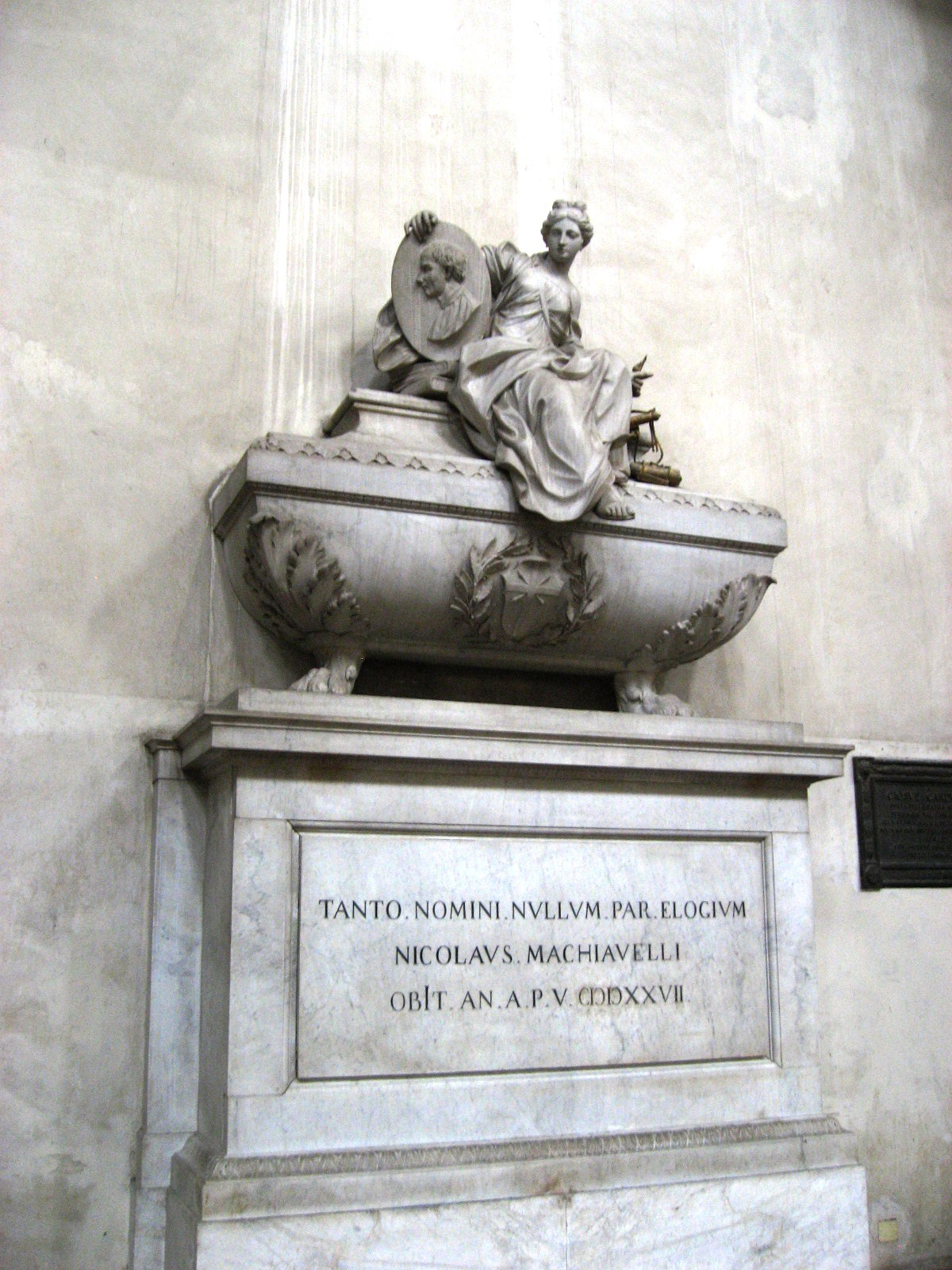
Machiavelli's tomb in the Santa Croce Church in Florence

=== Exile and later years ===
Machiavelli's success was short-lived. In August 1512, the Medici, backed by Pope Julius II, used Spanish troops to defeat the Florentines at Prato. As the militia failed to protect the city, a massacre followed, which led to the collapse of the Republic. In the wake of the siege, Piero Soderini resigned as Florentine head of state and fled into exile. The Florentine city-state and the republic were dissolved. Machiavelli was ordered to remain in Florence for a year, and to pay a surety of 1,000 florins. He was falsely implicated in a conspiracy to remove the Medici family from power merely because his name was on a list of possible sympathizers. He was tortured, being subjected to several drops of the "strappado", he nonetheless denied involvement and was released after three weeks. He was freed due to Pope Leo X granting amnesty to all political prisoners.

Machiavelli then retired to his farm estate at Sant'Andrea in Percussina, near San Casciano in Val di Pesa, where he devoted himself to studying and writing political treatises. During this period, he represented the Florentine Republic on diplomatic visits to France, Germany, and elsewhere in Italy. Despairing of the opportunity to remain directly involved in political matters, after a time he began to participate in intellectual groups in Florence and wrote several plays that (unlike his works on political theory) were both popular and widely known in his lifetime. Politics remained his main passion, and to satisfy this interest, he maintained a well-known correspondence with more politically connected friends, attempting to become involved once again in political life. As he frequently sent letters during this time to his friends, his personal correspondence is also of interest to historians and scholars of Italian correspondence. Machiavelli had a lengthy correspondence with his close friend, Francesco Vettori. In one of his letters which he details his life after his exile, he described his latest project as one of his "whimsies" that would later be called Il Principe (The Prince), and that he is planning on filling the work "with everything he knows". As the letter to Vettori continues, he described his current situation:

When evening comes, I go back home, and go to my study. On the threshold, I take off my work clothes, covered in mud and filth, and I put on the clothes an ambassador would wear. Decently dressed, I enter the ancient courts of rulers who have long since died. There, I am warmly welcomed, and I feed on the only food I find nourishing and was born to savour. I am not ashamed to talk to them and ask them to explain their actions and they, out of kindness, answer me. Four hours go by without my feeling any anxiety. I forget every worry. I am no longer afraid of poverty or frightened of death. I live entirely through them.

Though scholars often debate on the time of the composition of the Discourses on Livy, most place the composition of the book around 1515 and 1517.

From 1516 Machiavelli had frequented the Orti Oricellari gardens, a place where it was common for humanists and philosophers to discuss anti-tyrannical themes, and it was in these gardens where Machiavelli gained a friendship with Bernardo Rucellai and Zanobi Buondelmonti, men whom Machiavelli would dedicate his Discoursi to.

In 1520, Machiavelli won the favor of the Medici family, and Giulio Cardinal de Medici commissioned him to write a work of history of the city of Florence. Machiavelli saw this as an opportunity to get back into his political career, thus he began working on what would later be known as the Florentine Histories. During this period, Machiavelli also wrote the Dell'arte della guerra, which was the only work published during his lifetime.

In his exile, he also wrote plays, including Clizia, The Mandrake (La Mandragola), and The Golden Ass.

After the 1527 Sack of Rome, the Medici were thrown out of Florence once more, and citizens set up a republican form of government. There were discussions to give Machiavelli a post in this new government, which were rejected due to the favors he was given to by the Medici.

=== Death and burial ===
Machiavelli died on 21 June 1527 from a stomach disease that he had been suffering from since 1525. He died at the age of 58 after receiving his last rites. He was buried at the Church of Santa Croce in Florence. In 1789 George Nassau Clavering, and Pietro Leopoldo, Grand Duke of Tuscany, initiated the construction of a monument on Machiavelli's tomb. It was sculpted by Innocenzo Spinazzi, with an epitaph by Doctor Ferroni inscribed on it. (Note: The Latin legend reads: TANTO NOMINI NULLUM PAR ELOGIUM ("So great a name (has) no adequate praise" or "No eulogy (would be) a match for such a great name" or "There is no praise equal to so great a name."))

== Major works ==
=== The Prince ===
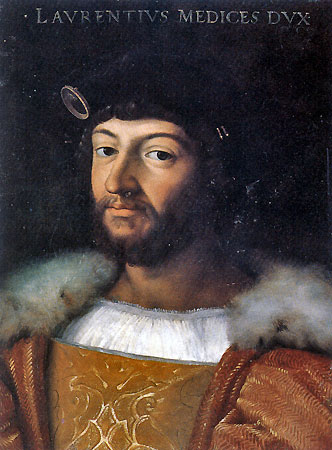
Lorenzo di Piero de' Medici, to whom the final version of The Prince was dedicated

Machiavelli's best-known book Il Principe is a manual on succeeding in royal politics. Instead of solely appealing to the more traditional target audience of a hereditary prince, it also focuses on men whom Machiavelli deems "new princes", who have founded their dynasties. To retain royal authority, the hereditary prince does not have to do much to keep his position, as Machiavelli states that only an "excessive force" will deprive him of his rule. By contrast, a new prince has the more difficult task in ruling: he must first stabilize his newfound power in order to build an enduring political structure. Machiavelli views that the virtues often recommended to princes actually hinder their ability to rule, thus a prince must learn to be able to act opposite to said virtues in order to maintain his regime. A ruler must be concerned not only with reputation, but also must be positively willing to act unscrupulously at the right times. Machiavelli believed that, for a ruler, it was better to be widely feared than to be greatly loved; a loved ruler retains authority by obligation, while a feared leader rules by fear of punishment. As a political theorist, Machiavelli emphasized the "necessity" for the methodical exercise of brute force or deceit, including extermination of entire noble families, to head off any chance of a challenge to the prince's authority.

Machiavelli focused on instrumentality in state building, an approach embodied by the saying, often erroneously attributed to Machiavelli, "The ends justify the means". Fraud and deceit are held by Machiavelli as necessary for a prince to use. Violence may be necessary for the successful stabilization of power and introduction of new political institutions. Force may be used to eliminate political rivals, destroy resistant populations, and purge the community of other men strong enough of a character to rule, who will inevitably attempt to replace the ruler. In one passage, Machiavelli subverts the advice given by Cicero to avoid duplicity and violence, by saying that the prince should "be the fox to avoid the snares, and a lion to overwhelm the wolves". It would become one of Machiavelli's most famous maxims. Machiavelli's view that acquiring a state and maintaining it requires evil means has been noted as the chief theme of the treatise. Machiavelli gives advice on how a prince should go about foreign policy, and how he should proceed in building a competent military.

Many early readers were shocked at many of the conclusions which Machiavelli makes in The Prince. Due to the treatise's controversial analysis on politics, in 1559, the Catholic Church banned The Prince, putting it on the Index Librorum Prohibitorum. Machiavelli is fascinated by, and focuses mainly on, those who aim to create entirely new political societies. In contrast with—and in opposition to—Plato and Aristotle, Machiavelli insisted that "imaginary republics and principalities" i.e. the realization of the best political regime is not possible, and as such a prince must seek the "effectual truth" (verita effetuale).

Machiavelli gives recommendations on how a prince should proceed in domestic and foreign affairs, and gives a classification of the various types of principalities, and how they are organized. The book has also gained notoriety for its lionization of bold and ferocious statesmen such as Cesare Borgia and Septimius Severus.

There is an ongoing debate on the timeline of the composition of The Prince and his other works. Scholar William Connell views that the composition and development of The Prince was a lengthy process with his ideas being revised from 1513 to 1515. The title of the finished work, Il Principe differs from the original title De Principatibus ("Of Principalities") and appeared after the book was published in 1532. Scholars do not possess any existing manuscript in Machiavelli's own handwriting. Concerning the differences and similarities in Machiavelli's advice to ruthless and tyrannical princes in The Prince and his more republican exhortations in Discourses on Livy, Nathan Tarcov and Harvey Mansfield have proposed a synthesis between the two works and assert that The Prince also contains arguments for the superiority of republican regimes, similar to those found in the Discourses.

In the 18th century, the work was called a satire by Jean-Jacques Rousseau (1712–1778), and other thinkers of the Enlightenment. This however is an interpretation that is often refuted by scholars. Isaiah Berlin states that he cannot find anything other than Machiavelli's work that "reads less" like a satirical piece. Maurizio Viroli writes that the claim "misrepresents the meaning of the text."

Scholars such as Leo Strauss and Harvey Mansfield have stated that sections of The Prince and his other works have deliberately esoteric statements throughout them. However, Mansfield states that this is the result of Machiavelli's seeing grave and serious things as humorous because they are "manipulable by men", and sees them as grave because they "answer human necessities".

The Marxist theorist Antonio Gramsci (1891–1937) argued that Machiavelli's audience was the common people, as opposed to the ruling class, who were already made aware of the methods described through their education.

=== Discourses on Livy ===
The Discourses on the First Ten Books of Titus Livius, written around 1517, and published in 1531, often referred to simply as the Discourses or Discorsi, is nominally a discussion regarding the Livy's classical history of early Ancient Rome. Machiavelli presents it as a series of lessons on how a republic should be started and structured. It is a larger work than The Prince, and while it more openly explains the advantages of republics, it also contains many similar themes from his other works. For example, Machiavelli has noted that to save a republic from corruption, it is necessary to return it to a "kingly state" using violent means. He excuses Romulus for murdering his brother Remus and co-ruler Titus Tatius to gain absolute power for himself in that he established a "civil way of life", or a kingdom with laws suitable for a republic. Commentators disagree about how much the two works agree with each other, as Machiavelli frequently refers to leaders of republics as "princes". Machiavelli even sometimes acts as an advisor to tyrants. Other scholars have pointed out the aggrandizing and imperialistic features of Machiavelli's republic. In the largest chapter in the Discourses, Machiavelli goes into specific detail on conspiracies against princes. Unlike his classical predecessors who debated the morality of such an act, Machiavelli goes into the ways and means private individuals have tried to overthrow their rulers. It became one of the central texts of modern republicanism, and has been argued by J. G. A. Pocock to be a more comprehensive work than The Prince.

=== Florentine Histories ===
Machiavelli followed the tradition of humanist historians by structuring his work as "histories," organizing it into books with introductory sections and crafted speeches presented as authentic records. However, his narrative unfolds in a broader, almost philosophical framework, being a struggle between virtue and fortune. Central to the Florentine Histories is Florence’s destructive factionalism, which, unlike the productive conflicts of ancient Rome, left the city fragmented and morally decayed. Like his Discourses on Livy, the work includes subtle critiques of the Church and character sketches, particularly of the Medici, with the narrative pivoting around Cosimo de’ Medici’s return from exile in 1434. It also contains a notably dramatic speech attributed to Michele di Lando, leader of the 1378 Ciompi Revolt, which briefly established Florence’s most democratic government. He also relays in detail the Pazzi conspiracy against the Medici, and the means by which it was put down. While not a modern historian, Machiavelli demonstrates a commitment to factual analysis through his focus on "diverse effects," and he tended to combine historical detail with the political insight he gained from his career. Scholar Michelle T. Clarke has noted a theme of critique against the humanist tradition, which has been said to dominate Florentine intellectual circles in Machiavelli's day. Machiavelli attempted to describe as accurately as possible the methods of which the Medici family were able to take power in Florence, and how they overcame their rivals, despite his worries in potentially offending his Medici patron. Salvatore Di Maria states that Machiavelli's "cyclical approach of history" is most evident within the first eight books of the Istorie. He also asserts that, for Machiavelli, ambition plays a large role as the driving force in human action. While some scholars have viewed that Machiavelli takes a "conservative" turn against democratic republicanism in the Florentine Histories, John P. McCormick argues against this, stating that there is "no reason" to assume that Machiavelli abandoned the political ideas which he had outlined in The Prince and The Discourses. Alexander Duff claimed that Machiavelli dissented against the "neoclassical" understanding of Florence's founding, showing that political dialogue was not efficacious in solving factional strife. Jurdjevic questioned the ultimate reliability of Machiavelli's history through his treatment of Francesco Valori.

=== The Art of War ===
The Art of War is divided into a preface (proemio) and seven books (chapters), which take the form of a series of dialogues that take place in the Orti Oricellari, the gardens built in a classical style by Bernardo Rucellai in the 1490s for Florentine aristocrats and humanists to engage in discussion, between Cosimo Rucellai and "Lord Fabrizio Colonna" (many feel Colonna is a veiled disguise for Machiavelli himself, but this view has been challenged by scholars such as Mansfield), with other patrizi and captains of the recent Florentine republic: Zanobi Buondelmonti, Battista della Palla and Luigi Alamanni. The work is dedicated to Lorenzo di Filippo Strozzi, patrizio fiorentino in a preface which ostentatiously pronounces Machiavelli's authorship. After repeated uses of the first person singular to introduce the dialogue, Machiavelli retreats from the work, serving as neither narrator nor interlocutor.

Fabrizio dominates the discussions with his knowledge of affairs of war and military conduct. Fabrizio positions himself not only as an expert in the art of war but as a founder of a new form of military thinking, inspired by classical theory.

Machiavelli views the art of war to be of the highest importance of statesmen, believing that such knowledge of fighting wars can enable leaders of nations to acquire empire. He promises great glory to those who take up the task of founding great military orders in their states. (Note: In the section, "War and Politics") Yves Winter stated that the Art of War can be best viewed as a criticism of "humanist grandstanding" and a further elaboration of Machiavelli's call in Chapter 26 of The Prince to form a new political-military order that can free Italy from "barbarian domination". Mansfield asserts that the work employs too much irony to be "a serious study in the usual sense", but it establishes and promotes "the serious study of war" in the modern era.

== Originality ==
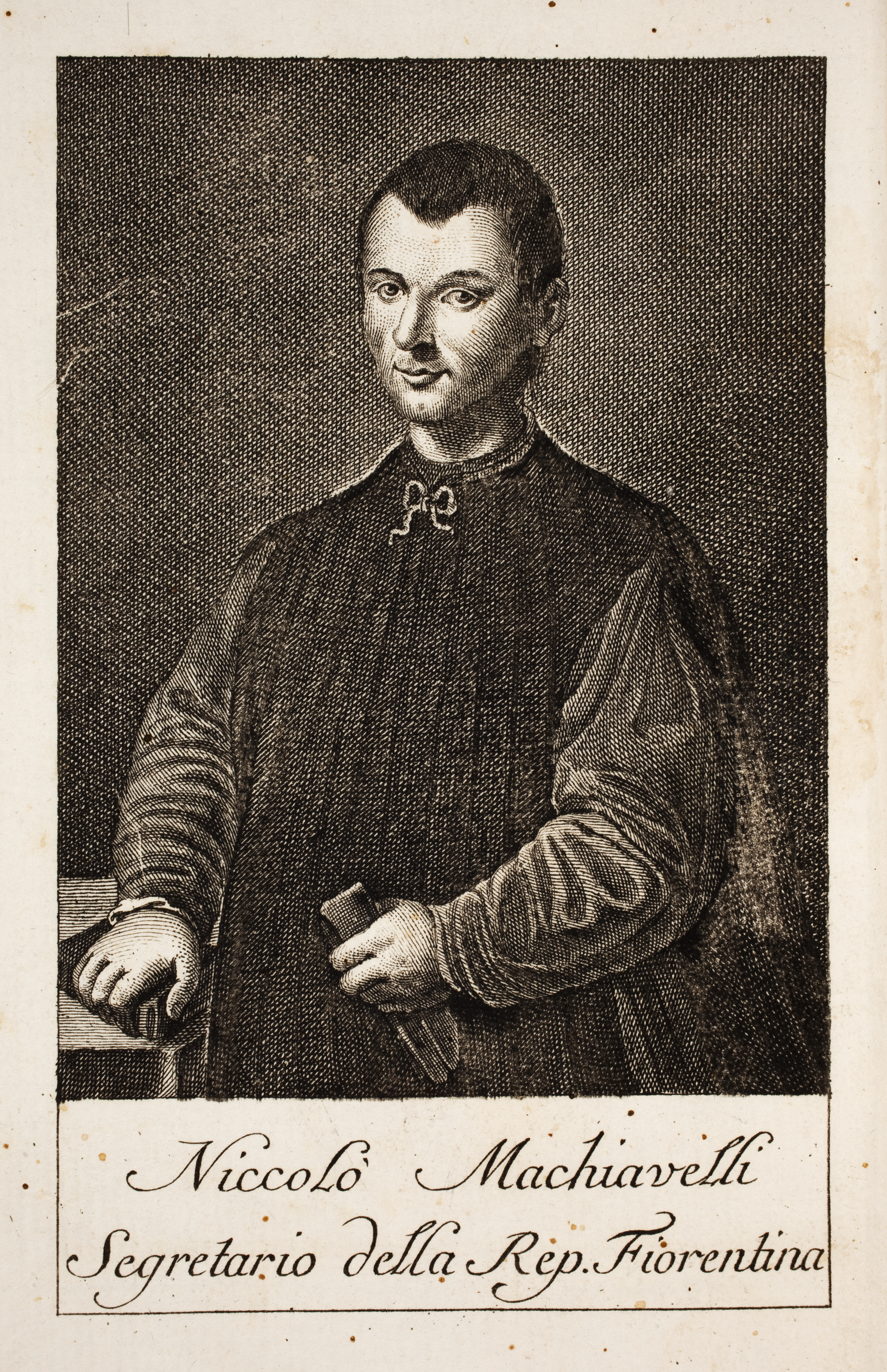
Engraved portrait of Machiavelli, from the Peace Palace Library's Il Principe, published in 1769

Commentary on Machiavelli's work has focused on two issues: how unified and philosophical his work is and how innovative or traditional it is.

=== Coherence ===
There is some disagreement concerning how best to describe the unifying themes, if there are any, that can be found in Machiavelli's works, especially in the two major political works, The Prince and Discourses. Machiavelli has been described as inconsistent, and he viewed that Machiavelli did not place a high priority on consistency. Others such as Hans Baron have argued that his ideas must have changed dramatically over time. Some have argued that his conclusions are best understood as a product of his times, experiences and education. Commentators such as Leo Strauss, thought that Machiavelli's books contain "everything he knows". Harvey Mansfield stated that Machiavelli launched a consistent attack on classical political science in favor of new ideas. There is also some considerable debate as to Machiavelli's status as a philosopher proper, and to what extent Machiavelli aimed for a systematic approach to politics. Some commentators such as Robert Dahl view Machiavelli to be an unsystematic thinker, while others believe that Machiavelli ultimately was a philosopher and took an ultimately systematic approach to his political project.

=== Influences ===
Commentators such as Leo Strauss have gone so far as to name Machiavelli as the deliberate originator of modernity itself. Others have argued that Machiavelli is only a particularly interesting example of trends which were happening around him. In any case, Machiavelli presented himself at various times as someone reminding Italians of the old virtues of the Romans and Greeks, and other times as someone promoting a completely new approach to politics. Machiavelli emphasizes the originality of his endeavor in several instances. Machiavelli frequently seems to act without any regard for his predecessors.

==== The Mirror of Princes genre ====
Gilbert (1938) summarized the similarities between The Prince and the genre it imitates, the so-called "Mirror of Princes" style. This was a classically influenced genre, with models at least as far back as Xenophon and Isocrates. While Gilbert emphasized the similarities, however, he agreed with all other commentators that Machiavelli was particularly novel in the way he used this genre, even when compared to his contemporaries such as Baldassare Castiglione and Erasmus. One of the major innovations Gilbert noted was that Machiavelli focused on the "deliberate purpose of dealing with a new ruler who will need to establish himself in defiance of custom".

==== Classical republicanism ====
Commentators such as Quentin Skinner and J.G.A. Pocock, in the so-called "Cambridge School" of interpretation, have asserted that some of the republican themes in Machiavelli's political works, particularly the Discourses on Livy, can be found in medieval Italian literature which was influenced by classical authors such as Sallust. These commentators also consider thinkers such as Dante Alghieri, Petrarch, and Leonardo Bruni amongst those who could have been possible major influences on Machiavelli.

==== Classical political philosophy: Xenophon, Plato and Aristotle ====
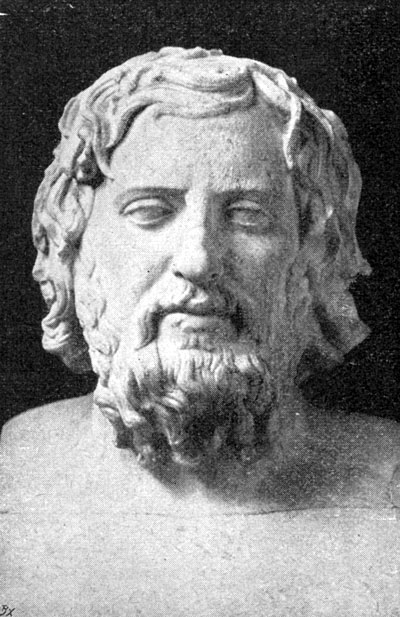
Xenophon, author of the Cyropedia

Political thinkers usually engage to some extent with their forerunners, even (or perhaps particularly) those who aim to fundamentally disagree with prior thoughts. Therefore, even with a figure as seemingly innovative as Machiavelli, scholars have looked deeper into his works to consider possible historical and philosophical influences. Although Machiavelli examined ancient philosophers, he does not frequently reference them as authorities. He mentions neither Plato nor Aristotle in The Prince, and he mentions Aristotle only once in The Discourses. He usually does not speak of philosophers as such, but mentions "writers" and "authors". One of the writers Machiavelli mentions the most is Xenophon. In his time, the most commonly cited discussion of classical virtues was Book One of Cicero's De Officiis. Yet, Cicero is never directly mentioned in The Prince, and is mentioned only three times in the Discourses.

The major difference between Machiavelli and the Socratics, according to Strauss, is Machiavelli's materialism, and therefore his rejection of both a teleological view of nature and of the view that philosophy is higher than politics. With their teleological understanding of things, Socratics argued that by nature, everything that acts, acts towards some end, as if nature desired them, but Machiavelli claimed that such things happen by blind chance or human action.

==== Classical materialism ====
Strauss argued that Machiavelli may have seen himself as influenced by some ideas from classical materialists such as Democritus, Epicurus and Lucretius. Strauss however sees this also as a sign of major innovation in Machiavelli, because classical materialists did not share the Socratic regard for political life, while Machiavelli clearly did.

==== Thucydides ====
Some scholars such as Paul Rahe note the similarity between Machiavelli and the Greek historian Thucydides, since both emphasized power politics. Strauss argued that contemporary readers "are reminded by Machiavelli's teaching of Thucydides" and that they find in both writers "the same "realism", i.e., the same denial of the power of the gods or of justice and the same sensitivity to harsh necessity and elusive chance." However he states that Thucydides never calls in question "the intrinsic superiority of nobility to baseness".

== Themes ==
=== Political science ===
Machiavelli is sometimes seen as the prototype of a modern empirical scientist, building generalizations from experience and historical facts, and emphasizing the uselessness of theorizing with the imagination.

Machiavelli often switches between his professed novelty of his ideas and his evident reliance on ancient history. In the preface to the first book of The Discourses, he presents himself as both a discoverer of "new modes and orders" and as a restorer of the ancient understanding of politics. While he viewed the classical approach to government to be self-limiting and harmful in many cases, he nonetheless attributes this to a false understanding of political history. Moreover, he studied the way people lived and aimed to inform leaders how they should rule and even how they themselves should live. Machiavelli denies the classical opinion that living virtuously always leads to happiness. For example, Machiavelli viewed misery as "one of the vices that enables a prince to rule." Machiavelli stated that "it would be best to be both loved and feared. But since the two rarely come together, anyone compelled to choose will find greater security in being feared than in being loved." In much of Machiavelli's work, he often states that the ruler must adopt unsavoury policies for the sake of the continuance of his regime. Because cruelty and fraud play such important roles in his politics, it is not unusual for certain issues (such as murder and betrayal) to be commonplace within his works. Machiavelli also places his focus specifically on the beginnings and foundations of political societies, where a lawful government has to be established by extralegal methods.

A related and more controversial proposal often made is that he described how to do things in politics in a way which seemed neutral concerning who used the advice – tyrants or good rulers.< Leo Strauss declared himself as sympathetic toward the traditional view that Machiavelli was self-consciously a "teacher of evil", and that his teaching is "immoral and irreligious", because of his blatant rejection of the classical virtues, and because of his "anti theological ire", that is, his antipathy toward the effects of religious doctrine. Strauss takes up this opinion because he asserted that failure to accept the traditional opinion misses the "intrepidity of his thought" and "the graceful subtlety of his speech". Strauss however comments that the traditional view is deficient and recommends an "ascent" from it. Italian anti-fascist philosopher Benedetto Croce (1925) concludes that Machiavelli inaugurated the concept of the "autonomy of politics", where politics is viewed as a separate category than private morality. Croce also stated that Machiavelli is an "enigma that will never be resolved". German philosopher Ernst Cassirer (1946) held that Machiavelli "was a great historian", and that he was interested in "the statics not in the dynamics of historical life". On Machiavelli's approach, Cassirer added that he "sought for the recurrent features, for those things that are the same at all times." With a focus on Machiavelli's ideas on the foundations of cities and societies, Louis Althusser stated that Machiavelli was a "theorist of beginnings". The role that Machiavelli places on political violence has been debated by academics as well. Winter states that Machiavelli is both an advocate and a critic of political violence, and viewed violence as a vehicle to attain the desired political results. Sheldon Wolin describes Machiavelli's recommendation to use violence as an "economy of violence", aimed to preserve a stable political order. Michael Anton analyzed the role that war and propaganda plays within Machiavelli's body of work, judging those topics to be key in understanding his thought.

=== Fortuna and Virtù ===
Machiavelli's own concept of virtue, which he calls "virtù", is original and is usually seen as different from the traditional viewpoints of other political philosophers. Virtù can consist of any quality at the moment that helps a ruler maintain his state, even being ready to engage in necessary evil when it is advantageous. Harvey Mansfield wrote of Machiavelli's followers that: "In attempting other, more regular and scientific modes of overcoming fortune, Machiavelli's successors formalized and emasculated his notion of virtue." Mansfield describes Machiavelli's usage of virtù as a "compromise with evil". Mansfield however argues that Machiavelli's own aims have not been shared by those he influenced. Machiavelli argued against seeing mere peace and economic growth as worthy aims on their own if they would lead to what Mansfield calls the "taming of the prince".

An example of Machiavelli's wide usage of the word can be found in his assessment of criminal rulers, as he seems to ascribe as well as detract the label of "virtuous" to their actions in establishing their dominion, leading scholars to debate whether he is actually following or intentionally subverting the traditional doctrine of moral and political virtue.

Fortuna is not an original concept, and was adopted by Machiavelli, however his novel use of the idea became central to his political thought. The way in which Machiavelli viewed that a statesman must use his virtue in order to conquer fortune, has been seen as differing from the ancient philosophers, including the Greek and Roman versions of the concept.

For Machiavelli, Fortuna is represented as an entity that controls human affairs, and thus is something to take control of as much as possible in order to ensure success. He recommends that political leaders take up impetuous policies in order to adapt to the times they find themselves in, as these are subject to radical change.

Najemy has argued that this same approach can be found in Machiavelli's approach to love and desire, as seen in his comedies and correspondence. Najemy shows how Machiavelli's friend Vettori argued against Machiavelli and cited a more traditional understanding of fortune. Cary Nederman says of Machiavelli's use of fortuna that: "Machiavelli’s remarks point toward several salient conclusions about Fortuna and her place in his intellectual universe. Throughout his corpus, Fortuna is depicted as a primal source of violence (especially as directed against humanity) and as antithetical to reason. Thus, Machiavelli realizes that only preparation to pose an extreme response to the vicissitudes of Fortuna will ensure victory against her. This is what virtù provides: the ability to respond to fortune at any time and in any way that is necessary." On Machiavelli's use of virtu, Quentin Skinner noted that "properly understood, the princely virtues are among the qualities that go to make up the virtù of a truly virtuoso prince, thereby helping him to fulfil his primary duty of maintaining the state in a condition of security and peace."

There have been comparisons of Machiavelli's concept of virtu to the ancient Greek concept of arete. However, Machiavelli's concept of virtue is considered to be distinct from Thucydides' view of political virtue.

=== Religion ===
He was not only a theorist of monarchical rule in The Prince, but, paradoxically, an ardent republican. He was a religious radical, rejecting not only the contemporary Catholic church but Christianity as such; he may even have been a clandestine atheist.

— Robert Black, 2022

Machiavelli shows repeatedly that he saw religion as deriving from human origin, and that the value of religion lies in its contribution to social order and the rules of morality must be dispensed with if security requires it. In The Prince, the Discourses and in the Life of Castruccio Castracani he describes "prophets", as he calls them, like Moses, Romulus, Cyrus the Great and Theseus as the greatest of new princes, the glorious and brutal founders of the most novel innovations in politics, and men whom Machiavelli emphasizes have always used armed force, being willing to kill those who did not ultimately agree with their vision. He estimated that these sects last from 1,666 to 3,000 years each time, which, as pointed out by Leo Strauss, would mean that Christianity became due to start finishing about 150 years after Machiavelli. Machiavelli's concern with Christianity as a religion was that it made the Italians of his day "weak and effeminate", delivering politics into the hands of cruel and wicked men without a fight, as well as celebrated humility and otherworldly things, instead of being focused on the tangible world. While Machiavelli's own religious allegiance has been debated, it is assumed that he had a low regard of contemporary Christianity. Machiavelli is generally seen as being critical of Christianity as it existed in his time, specifically its effect upon politics and humanity in general. In his opinion, the Christianity that the Church had come to accept allowed practical decisions to be guided too much by imaginary ideals and encouraged people to lazily leave events up to providence or, as he put it, chance, luck or fortune. Machiavelli took a radically different view, and opined that the pagan religion, given its faults, was preferable to Christianity as it championed martial warfare.

Some scholars, like Sebastian De Grazia and Maurizio Viroli, view that Machiavelli viewed religion more intimately than previously thought. In contrast, Nathan Tarcov has noted that Machiavelli's praise of religion, in actuality, provides cover for his anti-clericalism and antipathy towards Christianity proper. Vickie Sullivan similarly argues that, for Machiavelli, Christianity made the practice of free government impossible. Margaret Scott stated that if Machiavelli was not an atheist at heart, he "certainly looked like one on paper".

Machiavelli engages with the Averroist view that the world is eternal, and as such had no creation, and he also discusses the causes of religious sects rising and falling, ascribing them to both human and natural causes. In The Prince, Machiavelli discusses the ecclesiastical principate, which included regimes like that of the Catholic Church in Rome and the Ottoman Empire in Turkey. Machiavelli seems to have admired Muslim conquerors such as Selim I. Federico Chabod critique the idea that Machiavelli wanted a reform of the Catholic Church, stating that "the desire for the reform of the church of Rome," was "rooted in him in quite different motives" than those that drove the dissidents and the reformers of the time.

While fear of God can be replaced by fear of the prince, if there is a strong enough prince, Machiavelli felt that having a religion is in any case especially essential to keeping a republic in order. For Machiavelli, a truly great prince can never be conventionally religious himself, but he should make his people religious if he can. According to Strauss, he was not the first person to explain religion in this way, but his description of religion was novel because of the way he integrated this into his general account of princes.

Machiavelli's judgment that governments need religion for practical political reasons was widespread among modern proponents of republics until approximately the time of the French Revolution. This, therefore, represents a point of disagreement between Machiavelli and late modernity.

=== Terminology ===
==== Stato ====
Another term of Machiavelli's that there is debate over is his use of the word stato (literally translated as "state"). Whenever he uses the word, it usually refers to a regime's political command to which a leader takes a hold of, and rules over himself. Mansfield states that, while the state is a personal entity, he "laid the foundation for the modern state in his general and impartial advice to acquire stato." In contrast to the classical political theorists, Machiavelli viewed expansion as the primary goal for all states, replacing the cultivation of moral virtue proper. Machiavelli adopted yet differed from Polybius' cyclical theory of civilizations. He mixes the concept of the "cycle of regimes" with the cycle of civilizations, which are in fact two separate and distinct concepts.

==== Glory ====
Glory plays a central role in Machiavelli's political thought, drawing heavily on the Roman ideal of gloria, which emphasized public recognition for one's achievements, especially in warfare or public service. Robert Black wrote that "whereas for Machiavelli the end of politics was glory, either of the individual or of the political community." And added that because glory "satisfies only the selfish aspirations of a ruler or a state," it can "scarcely be regarded as a moral norm."

==== Republicanism ====
The majority of scholars have taken into account Machiavelli's admiration of, and recommendations to, republics, and his contribution to republican theory. Machiavelli gives lengthy advice for republics in how they can best protect their liberties, and how they can avoid those who would ultimately usurp legitimate authority.

Machiavelli was an ardent supporter of republican politics, and it is well attested that he preferred rule by a republic than that of a principality. Machiavelli viewed that republics are, in general, more trustworthy, more flexible in that they can elect leaders that are able to adapt to the times, and that public opinion can be relied upon more than the opinion of princes. However, he believed that republics needed the same glory seeking leader that was described in The Prince. For example, Machiavelli viewed that there could never be a republic or kingdom that had good orders unless it was founded by a man who was "one alone" (uno solo), or had absolute power. Machiavelli praised the Roman institution of the dictatorship, and stated that it "produced great effects" for Rome, in contrast to other political thinkers who either decried this practice or who omitted it from their works. He also stated that even in republics that a multitude is useless without a "head", or a leader to direct them. Machiavelli at various points of his works even teaches aspiring rulers to usurp civil liberty to institute a princely regime. Machiavelli's ideal republic has also been noted for its harshness by thinkers such as Guicciardini and Montesquieu with both criticizing Machiavelli's support of punitive violence. Machiavelli's republicanism has been described as populist, but Viroli asserts that at no point does Machiavelli praise democracy.

Commentators have no consensus as to the exact nature of his republicanism. For example, the "Cambridge School" of interpretation holds Machiavelli to be a civic humanist and classical republican who viewed that the highest quality of republican virtue is self-sacrifice for the common good. Quentin Skinner believes that the core of Machiavelli's theory of republican liberty lies in the citizenry to exhibit political virtue and be willing to go great lengths to rescue the laws of a republic. However this opinion has been contested by scholars who believe that Machiavelli has a radically modern view of republics, accepting and unleashing the self interest of those who rule. Some scholars have even asserted that the goal of his ideal republic does not differ greatly from his principality, as both rely on rather ruthless measures for conquest and empire.

==== Humors ====
Machiavelli believes that in all states, there exists two humors, that of the great, who wish to rule and oppress others, and that of the people, who do not seek to oppress. To Machiavelli, all states are thus oppressive in nature, with the ruling class seeking to perpetuate their political power over, and at the expense of, the masses. Machiavelli viewed both humors to be in constant conflict with one another, and that this conflict is at the crux of all political societies.

==== Necessity ====
Machiavelli frequently uses the word "necessity", though he does so in a wide variety of senses. Sometimes he uses the word to refer to something that needs to be done, other instances he uses the term referring to choice. Machiavelli's concept of necessity includes the need for a prince to sometimes act outside of moral conduct in order to survive, in opposition to a "profession of good". Mansfield comments that the double meaning of necessity in chapter 15 of The Prince shows "that necessity is not always compelling and does not in every case do away with choice."

== Influence ==
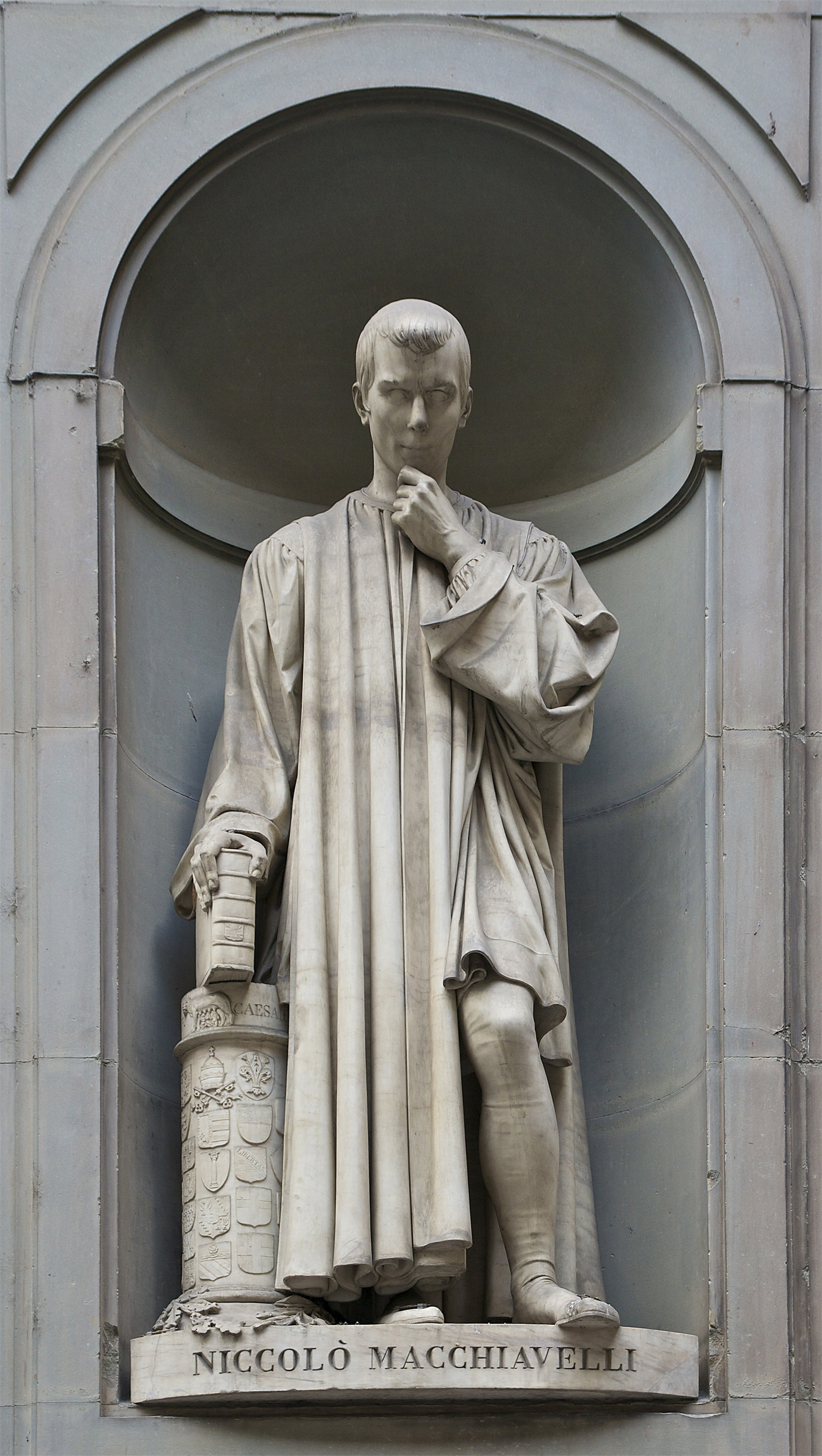
Statue at the Uffizi

To quote Robert Bireley:

...there were in circulation approximately fifteen editions of the Prince and nineteen of the Discourses and French translations of each before they were placed on the Index of Paul IV in 1559, a measure which nearly stopped publication in Catholic areas except in France. Three principal writers took the field against Machiavelli between the publication of his works and their condemnation in 1559 and again by the Tridentine Index in 1564. These were the English cardinal Reginald Pole and the Portuguese bishop Jeronymo Osorio, both of whom lived for many years in Italy, and the Italian humanist and later bishop, Ambrogio Caterino Politi.

Machiavelli's ideas had a profound impact on political leaders throughout the modern west, helped by the new technology of the printing press. During the first generations after Machiavelli, his main influence was in non-republican governments. Pole reported that The Prince was spoken of highly by Thomas Cromwell in England and had influenced Henry VIII in his turn towards Protestantism, and in his tactics, for example during the Pilgrimage of Grace. A copy was also possessed by the Catholic king and emperor Charles V. In France, after an initially mixed reaction, Machiavelli came to be associated with Catherine de' Medici and the St. Bartholomew's Day massacre. As Bireley (1990:17) reports, in the 16th century, Catholic writers "associated Machiavelli with the Protestants, whereas Protestant authors saw him as Italian and Catholic". Machiavelli had a considerable role in shaping the views of the political thinkers in the Dutch Republic as well.

One of the first works of criticism of Machiavelli's Prince was that of the Huguenot, Innocent Gentillet, whose work commonly referred to as Discourse against Machiavelli or Anti Machiavel was published in Geneva in 1576. He accused Machiavelli of being an atheist and accused politicians of his time by saying that his works were the "Koran of the courtiers", that "he is of no reputation in the court of France which hath not Machiavel's writings at the fingers ends". Another theme of Gentillet was more in the spirit of Machiavelli himself: he questioned the effectiveness of immorality in politics. Gentillet, like many of Machiavelli's critics, ultimately accepted the aspects of his thought that they denounced. This became the theme of much future political discourse in Europe during the 17th century. This includes the Catholic Counter Reformation writers summarised by Bireley: Giovanni Botero, Justus Lipsius, Carolus Scribani, Adam Contzen, Pedro de Ribadeneira, and Diego de Saavedra Fajardo. These authors criticized Machiavelli, but also followed him in many ways. They accepted the need for a prince to be concerned with reputation, and even a need for cunning and deceit, but compared to Machiavelli, and like later modernist writers, they emphasized economic progress much more than the riskier ventures of war. These authors tended to cite Tacitus as their source for realist political advice, rather than Machiavelli, and this pretence came to be known as "Tacitism". Cardinal Reginald Pole read The Prince while he was in Italy, and on which he gave his comments. Frederick the Great, king of Prussia and patron of Voltaire, wrote Anti-Machiavel, with the aim of rebutting The Prince.

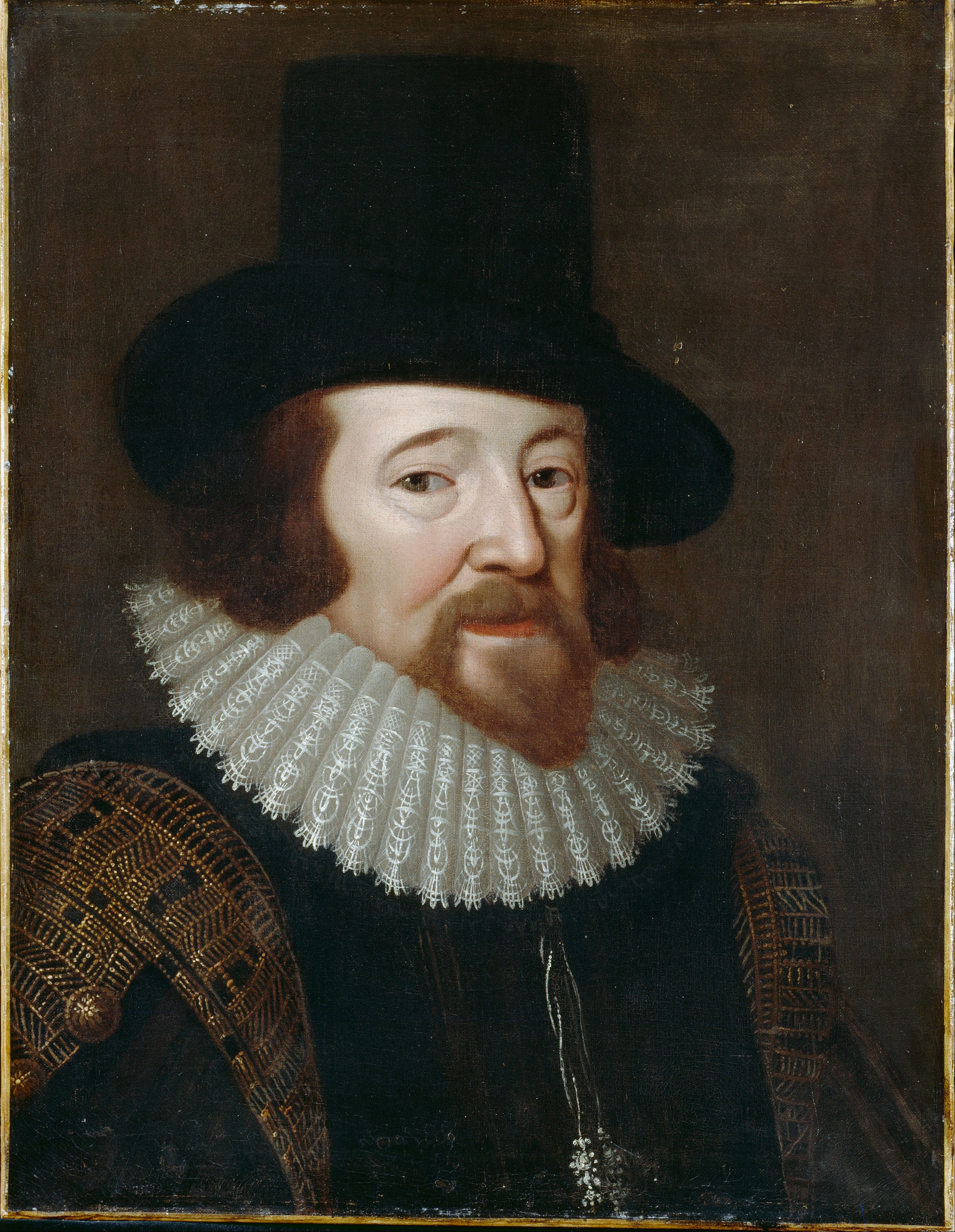
Francis Bacon argued the case for what would become modern science which would be based more upon real experience and experimentation, free from assumptions about metaphysics, and aimed at increasing control of nature. He named Machiavelli as a predecessor.

Modern materialist philosophy developed in the 16th, 17th and 18th centuries, starting in the generations after Machiavelli. Modern political philosophy tended to be republican, but as with the Catholic authors, Machiavelli's realism and encouragement of innovation to try to control one's own fortune were more accepted than his emphasis upon war and factional violence. Not only was innovative economics and politics a result, but also modern science, leading some commentators such as Kennington to say that the 18th century Enlightenment involved a "humanitarian" moderating of Machiavellianism.

Machiavelli influenced many political theorists, among them being Jean Bodin, Francis Bacon, Algernon Sidney, Harrington, John Milton, Spinoza, Rousseau, Hume, Edward Gibbon, and Adam Smith. Although he was not always mentioned by name as an inspiration, due to his controversy, he is also thought to have been an influence for other major philosophers, such as Montaigne, Descartes, Hobbes, Locke and Montesquieu. Jean-Jacques Rousseau viewed Machiavelli's work as one in which Machiavelli secretly exposes the faults of a one-man tyranny.

In the seventeenth century it was in England that Machiavelli's ideas were most substantially developed and adapted, and that republicanism came once more to life; and out of seventeenth-century English republicanism there were to emerge in the next century not only a theme of English political and historical reflection – of the writings of the Bolingbroke circle and of Gibbon and of early parliamentary radicals – but a stimulus to the Enlightenment in Scotland, on the Continent, and in America.

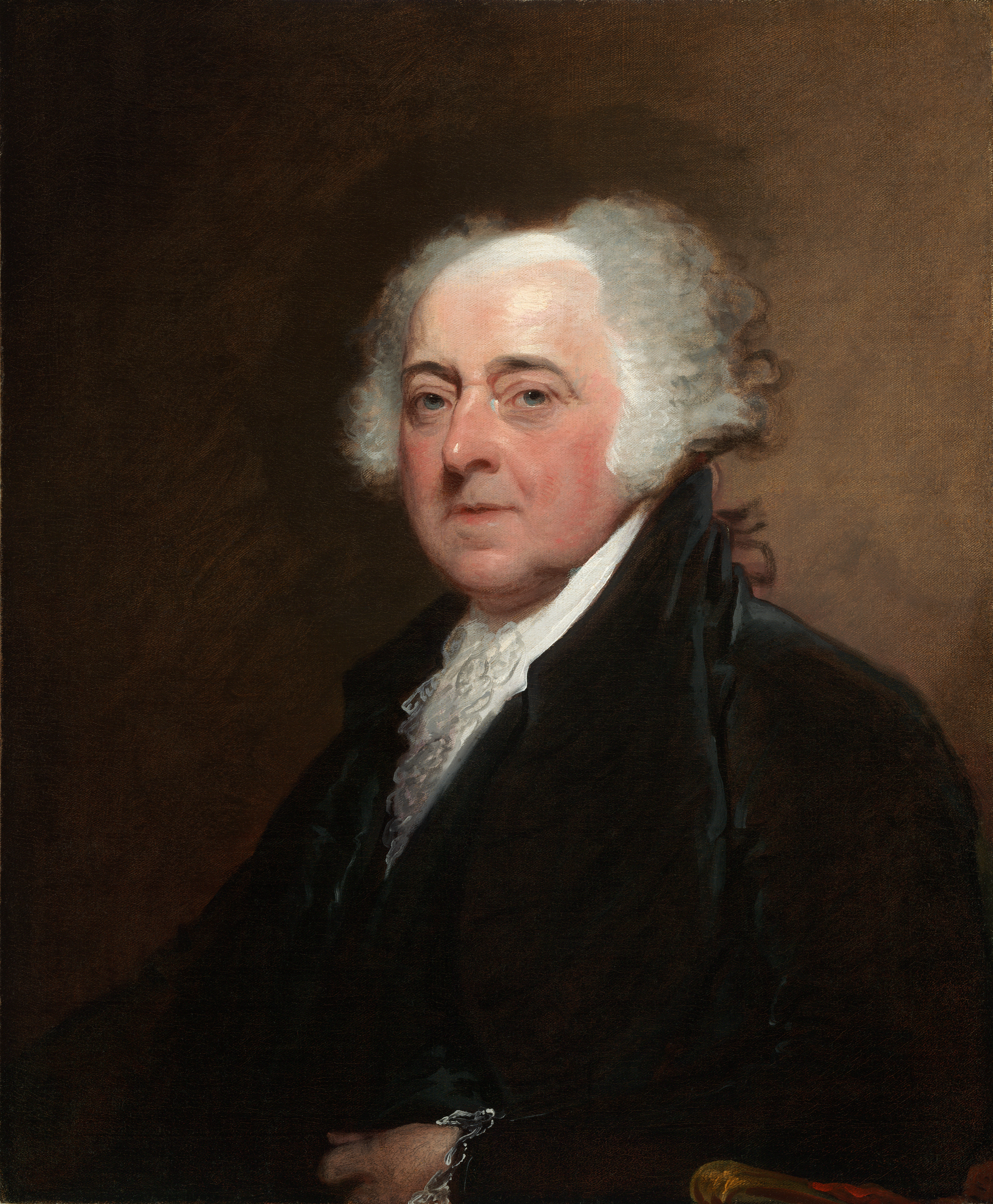
John Adams admired Machiavelli's rational description of the realities of statecraft. Adams used Machiavelli's works to argue for mixed government.

Some scholars have argued that Machiavelli was a major indirect and direct influence upon the political thinking of the Founding Fathers of the United States due to his overwhelming favoritism of republicanism and the republican type of government. According to John McCormick, as Machiavelli ultimately wanted his prince to side with the common people instead of the nobility, he views Machiavelli as a forerunner and champion of popular government. Benjamin Franklin, James Madison and Thomas Jefferson followed Machiavelli's republicanism when they opposed what they saw as the emerging aristocracy that they feared Alexander Hamilton was creating with the Federalist Party. Hamilton learned from Machiavelli about the importance of foreign policy for domestic policy, but may have broken from him regarding how rapacious a republic needed to be in order to survive. George Washington was less influenced by Machiavelli.

The Founding Father who perhaps most studied and valued Machiavelli as a political philosopher was John Adams, who profusely commented on the Italian's thought in his work, A Defence of the Constitutions of Government of the United States of America. In this work, John Adams praised Machiavelli, with Algernon Sidney and Montesquieu, as a philosophic defender of mixed government. For Adams, Machiavelli restored empirical reason to politics, while his analysis of factions was commendable. Adams likewise agreed with the Florentine that human nature was immutable and driven by passions. He also accepted Machiavelli's belief that all societies were subject to cyclical periods of growth and decay. For Adams, Machiavelli lacked only a clear understanding of the institutions necessary for good government.

In the 19th century, Machiavelli was represented as a patriot seeking the ultimate unification of Italy, and he inspired the thinkers of the Risorgimento. The scholarship on Machiavelli's works was also regarded with more interest.

The 20th-century Italian Communist Antonio Gramsci drew great inspiration from Machiavelli's writings on ethics, morals, and how they relate to the State and revolution in his writings on Passive Revolution, and how a society can be manipulated by controlling popular notions of morality. Gramsci admired what he viewed as a democratic strain in Machiavelli's thought, and sought to adopt it into his own philosophy. Joseph Stalin was said to have read The Prince and annotated his own copy. Italian Fascist leader Benito Mussolini also wrote a lengthy essay on Machiavelli's influence upon him, with the title Preludio al Machiavelli.

=== "Machiavellian" ===
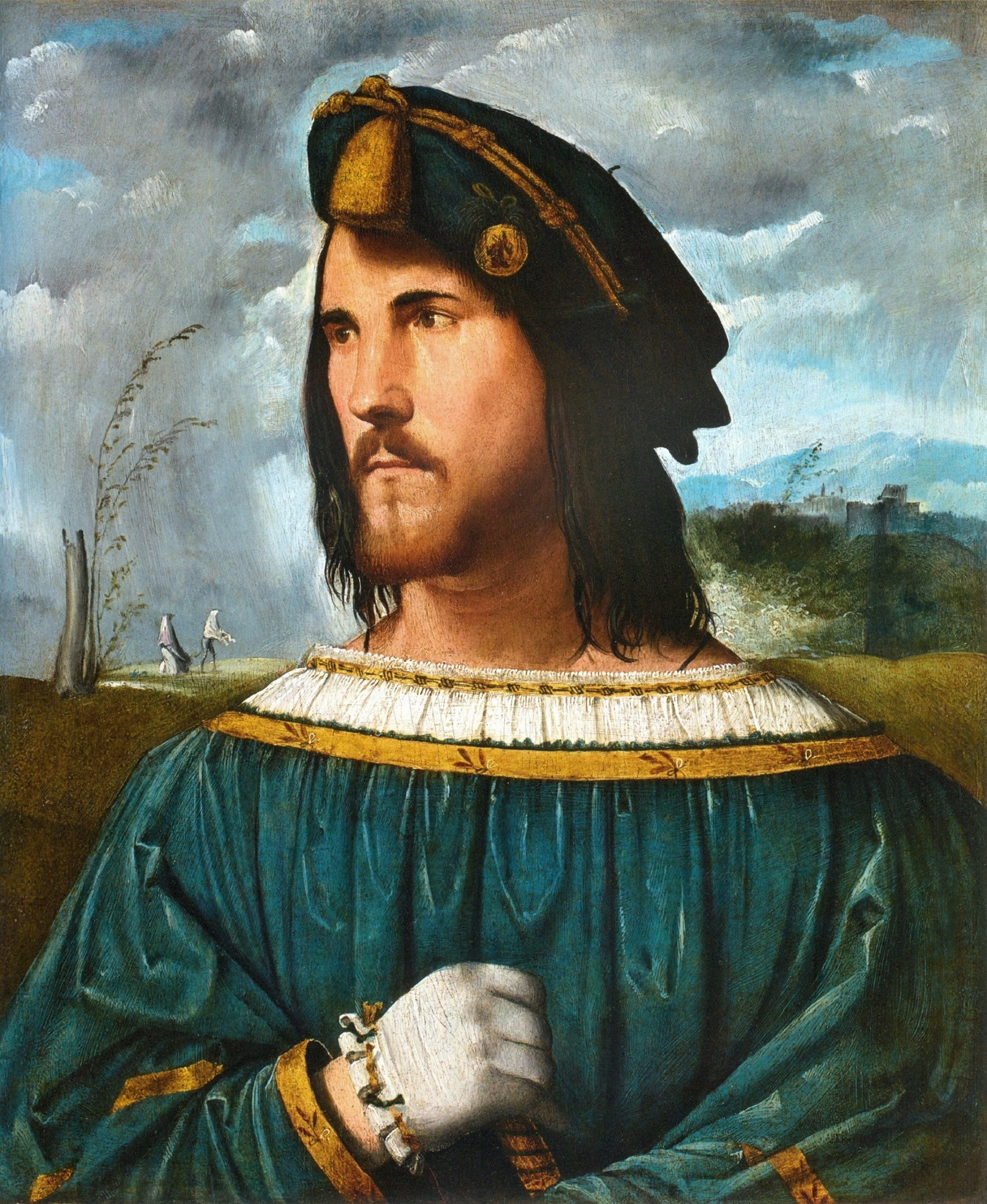
Portrait of a Gentleman, a portrait of Cesare Borgia. Cesare is used as an example of a successful ruler in The Prince

Machiavelli's works are sometimes even said to have contributed to the modern negative connotations of the words politics and politician, and it is sometimes thought that it is because of him that Old Nick became an English term for the Devil. Machiavelli's name as a pejorative gained increased usage in the late 16th century, as a result of the wide circulation of Machiavelli's works, and was usually associated with wickedness, especially political in nature. In the present day, the adjective Machiavellian is still a term which describes a form of politics that is "marked by cunning, duplicity, or bad faith". The word Machiavellianism is also a term used in political discussions, often as a byword for bare-knuckled political realism.

Despite this reputation, scholars frequently debate regarding the degree to which Machiavelli embraced the transgressions of virtuous conduct in being a politician, and Sullivan states that almost all scholars have to deal with his reputation as an immoralist, regardless of whether they "accept or deny" this view. Whatever his intentions, which are still debated today, he has become associated with a particular type of political action and thinking which justifies unsavory conduct in government. For example, Leo Strauss wrote:

Machiavelli is the only political thinker whose name has come into common use for designating a kind of politics, which exists and will continue to exist independently of his influence, a politics guided exclusively by considerations of expediency, which uses all means, fair or foul, iron or poison, for achieving its ends – its end being the aggrandizement of one's country or fatherland – but also using the fatherland in the service of the self-aggrandizement of the politician or statesman or one's party.

=== In popular culture ===
Due to Machiavelli's popularity, he has been featured in various ways in cultural depictions. In English Renaissance theatre, the term "Machiavel" (from 'Nicholas Machiavel', an "anglicization" of Machiavelli's name) was used for a stock antagonist that resorted to ruthless means to preserve the power of the state.

Christopher Marlowe's play The Jew of Malta (c. 1589) contains a prologue by a character called Machiavel, a Senecan ghost based on Machiavelli. In the play, Machiavel says:

I count religion but a childish toy,
And hold there is no sin but ignorance.

Shakespeare's titular character, Richard III, refers to Machiavelli in Henry VI, Part III, as the "murderous Machiavel".

== Works ==
=== Political and historical works ===
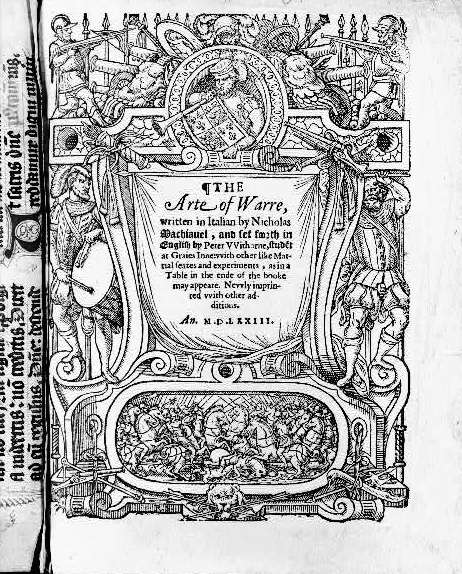
Peter Withorne's 1573 translation of The Art of War

- Discorso sopra le cose di Pisa (1499)
- Del modo di trattare i popoli della Valdichiana ribellati (1502)
- Discorso sopra la provisione del danaro (1502) – A discourse about the provision of money.
- Descrizione del modo tenuto dal Duca Valentino nello ammazzare Vitellozzo Vitelli, Oliverotto da Fermo, il Signor Pagolo e il duca di Gravina Orsini (1503) – A Description of the Methods Adopted by the Duke Valentino when Murdering Vitellozzo Vitelli, Oliverotto da Fermo, the Signor Pagolo, and the Duke di Gravina Orsini
- Ritratto delle cose della Magna (1508–1512) – Portrait of the affairs of Germany.
- Ritratti delle cose di Francia (1510) – Portrait of the affairs of France.
- The Prince (1513)
- Discourses on Livy (1517)
- Dell'Arte della Guerra (1519–1520) – The Art of War, high military science.
- Discorso sopra il riformare lo stato di Firenze (1520) – A discourse about the reforming of Florence.
- Sommario delle cose della citta di Lucca (1520) – A summary of the affairs of the city of Lucca.
- The Life of Castruccio Castracani of Lucca (1520) – Vita di Castruccio Castracani da Lucca, a short, partially fictional, biography of Castruccio Castracani, the ruler of Lucca.
- Istorie Fiorentine (1520–1525) – Florentine Histories, an eight-volume history of the city-state Florence, commissioned by Giulio de' Medici, later Pope Clement VII.

=== Fictional works ===
Machiavelli also wrote works of fiction throughout his life. He wrote several dramas and one novella. The Mandrake (Italian: La Mandragola is a satirical play that Machiavelli wrote and was published in 1524. La Mandragola follows the story of a husband, Messer Nicia, who wants to have a child, yet is infertile. His wife, Lucrezia, can have children, but the only way she is going to get pregnant is through another man. This ties in the story of Callimaco, who is attracted to Lucrezia though she is married. The play ends with Messer Nicia obtaining the child he wishes, and Lucrezia and Callimaco consummating their relationship. Though it is focused on private, non-political affairs, some scholars read into the play as being a mirror to his political treatises. He also wrote plays such as Andria and Clizia.

Some of his other work:

- Decennale primo (1506) – a poem in terza rima.
- Decennale secondo (1509) – a poem.
- Andria or The Girl from Andros (1517) – a semi-autobiographical comedy, adapted from Terence.
- Mandragola (1518) – The Mandrake – a five-act prose comedy, with a verse prologue.
- Clizia (1525) – a prose comedy.
- Belfagor arcidiavolo (1515) – a novella.
- Asino d'oro (1517) – The Golden Ass is a terza rima poem, a new version of the classic work by Apuleius.
- Frammenti storici (1525) – fragments of stories.

=== Other works ===
Della Lingua (Italian for "On the Language") (1514), a dialogue about Italy's language is normally attributed to Machiavelli. Machiavelli's literary executor, Giuliano de' Ricci, also reported having seen that Machiavelli, his grandfather, made a comedy in the style of Aristophanes which included living Florentines as characters, and to be titled Le Maschere. It has been suggested that due to such things as this and his style of writing to his superiors generally, there was very likely some animosity to Machiavelli even before the return of the Medici.

== Bibliography ==
=== Biographies ===
- Baron, Hans (April 1961). "Machiavelli: The Republican Citizen and the Author of 'the Prince'". The English Historical Review. 76 (299): 217–253. doi:10.1093/ehr/LXXVI.CCXCIX.217. JSTOR 557541.
- Black, Robert. Machiavelli: From Radical to Reactionary. London: Reaktion Books (2022)
- Burd, L. A., "Florence (II): Machiavelli" in Cambridge Modern History (1902), vol. I, ch. vi. pp. 190–218 online Google edition
- Capponi, Niccolò. An Unlikely Prince: The Life and Times of Machiavelli (Da Capo Press; 2010) 334 pages
- Celenza, Christopher S. Machiavelli: A Portrait (Cambridge, Massachusetts: Harvard University Press, 2015) 240 pages. ISBN 978-0674416123
- Godman, Peter (1998), From Poliziano to Machiavelli: Florentine Humanism in the High Renaissance, Princeton University Press
- de Grazia, Sebastian (1989), Machiavelli in Hell, Knopf Doubleday Publishing, ISBN 978-0679743422, an intellectual biography that won the Pulitzer Prize; excerpt and text search Archived 9 March 2021 at the Wayback Machine
- Hale, J. R. Machiavelli and Renaissance Italy (1961) online edition Archived 19 June 2009 at the Wayback Machine
- Hulliung, Mark. Citizen Machiavelli (Oxfordshire, UK: Routledge, 1983)
- Oppenheimer, Paul. Machiavelli: A Life Beyond Ideology (London; New York: Continuum, 2011) ISBN 978-1847252210
- Ridolfi, Roberto (17 June 2013). The Life of Niccolò Machiavelli (Routledge Library Editions: Political Science Volume 26). Routledge. ISBN 978-1-135-02662-2.
- Skinner, Quentin. Machiavelli, in Past Masters series. Oxford, UK: Oxford University Press, 1981. pp. vii, 102. ISBN 0192875167 pbk.
- Skinner, Quentin (25 July 2019). Machiavelli: A Very Short Introduction. Oxford University Press. ISBN 978-0-19-257454-1.
- Unger, Miles J. Machiavelli: A Biography (Simon & Schuster, 2011)
- Villari, Pasquale. The Life and Times of Niccolò Machiavelli (2 vols. 1892) (Vol 1; Vol 2)
- Viroli, Maurizio (2000), Niccolò's Smile: A Biography of Machiavelli, Farrar, Straus & Giroux excerpt and text search Archived 24 March 2021 at the Wayback Machine
- Viroli, Maurizio (1998). Machiavelli. Archived from the original on 20 October 2017 – via Questia.
- Vivanti, Corrado. Niccolò Machiavelli: An Intellectual Biography (Princeton University Press; 2013) 261 pages

=== Political thought ===
- Baron, Hans. The Crisis of the Early Italian Renaissance: Civic Humanism and Republican Liberty in an Age of Classicism and Tyranny (2 vol 1955), highly influential, deep study of civic humanism (republicanism); 700 pp. excerpts and text search; ACLS E-books; also vol 2 in ACLS E-books
- Baron, Hans. In Search of Florentine Civic Humanism (2 vols. 1988).
- Baron, Hans (1961), "Machiavelli: the Republican Citizen and Author of The Prince", English Historical Review, lxxvi (76): 217–253, doi:10.1093/ehr/LXXVI.CCXCIX.217, JSTOR 557541. in JSTOR Archived 18 November 2022 at the Wayback Machine
- Berlin, Isaiah. "The Originality of Machiavelli", in Berlin, Isaiah (1980). Against the Current: Essays in the History of Ideas. New York: The Viking Press.
- Bireley, Robert (1990), The Counter Reformation Prince
- Black, Robert (1999), "Machiavelli, servant of the Florentine republic", in Bock, Gisela; Skinner, Quentin; Viroli, Maurizio (eds.), Machiavelli and Republicanism, Cambridge University Press
- Bock, Gisela; Skinner, Quentin; Viroli, Maurizio, eds. (1993). Machiavelli and Republicanism. Cambridge University Press. ISBN 978-0521435895.
- Chabod, Federico (1958). Machiavelli & the Renaissance online edition Archived 19 June 2009 at the Wayback Machine; online from ACLS E-Books Archived 20 August 2008 at the Wayback Machine
- Connell, William J. (2001), "Machiavelli on Growth as an End," in Anthony Grafton and J.H.M. Salmon, eds., Historians and Ideologues: Essays in Honor of Donald R. Kelley, Rochester: University of Rochester Press, 259–277.
- Donskis, Leonidas, ed. (2011). Niccolò Machiavelli: History, Power, and Virtue. Rodopi, ISBN 978-9042032774, E-ISBN 978-9042032781
- Everdell, William R. "Niccolò Machiavelli: The Florentine Commune" in The End of Kings: A History of Republics and Republicans. Chicago: University of Chicago Press, 2000.
- Fischer, Markus (Autumn 1997). "Machiavelli's Political Psychology". The Review of Politics. 59 (4): 789–829. doi:10.1017/S0034670500028333. JSTOR 1408308. S2CID 146570913.
- Fischer, Markus (2000), Well-ordered License: On the Unity of Machiavelli's Thought, Lexington Book
- Frederick II of Prussia (1980) [1740]. Anti-Machiavel: The Refutation of Machiavelli s Prince. Translated by Sonnino, Paul. Athens, OH: Ohio University Press. ISBN 9780821405598.
- Guarini, Elena (1999), "Machiavelli and the crisis of the Italian republics", in Bock, Gisela; Skinner, Quentin; Viroli, Maurizio (eds.), Machiavelli and Republicanism, Cambridge University Press
- Gilbert, Allan (1938), Machiavelli's Prince and Its Forerunners, Duke University Press
- Gilbert, Felix. Machiavelli and Guicciardini: Politics and History in Sixteenth-Century Italy (2nd ed. 1984) online from ACLS-E-books Archived 18 November 2022 at the Wayback Machine
- Gilbert, Felix. "Machiavelli: The Renaissance of the Art of War," in Edward Mead Earle, ed. The Makers of Modern Strategy (1944)
- Jensen, De Lamar, ed. Machiavelli: Cynic, Patriot, or Political Scientist? (1960) essays by scholars online edition Archived 25 April 2010 at the Wayback Machine
- Jurdjevic, Mark (2014). A Great and Wretched City: Promise and Failure in Machiavelli's Florentine Political Thought. Cambridge, Massachusetts: Harvard University Press. ISBN 978-0674725461.
- Kennington, Richard (2004), On Modern Origins, Lexington Books
- Mansfield, Harvey C. "Machiavelli's Political Science," The American Political Science Review, Vol. 75, No. 2 (Jun. 1981), pp. 293–305 in JSTOR Archived 8 August 2016 at the Wayback Machine
- Mansfield, Harvey (1993), Taming the Prince, The Johns Hopkins University Press
- Mansfield, Harvey (1995), "Machiavelli and the Idea of Progress", in Melzer; Weinberger; Zinman (eds.), History and the Idea of Progress, Cornell University Press
- Mansfield, Harvey C. Machiavelli's Virtue (1996), 371 pp.
- Mansfield, Harvey C. Machiavelli's New Modes and Orders: A Study of the Discourses on Livy (2001) excerpt and text search Archived 11 March 2021 at the Wayback Machine
- Mansfield, Harvey C. (20 January 2026). The Rise and Fall of Rational Control: The History of Modern Political Philosophy. Harvard University Press. ISBN 978-0-674-29885-9.
- Roger Masters (1996), Machiavelli, Leonardo and the Science of Power, University of Notre Dame Press, ISBN 978-0268014339 See also NYT book review .
- Roger Masters (1998), Fortune is a River: Leonardo Da Vinci and Niccolò Machiavelli's Magnificent Dream to Change the Course of Florentine History, Simon & Schuster, ISBN 978-0-452-28090-8 Also available in Chinese (ISBN 9789572026113), Japanese (ISBN 978-4022597588), German (ISBN 978-3471794029), Portuguese (ISBN 978-8571104969), and Korean (ISBN 978-8984070059). See also NYT book review .
- Mattingly, Garrett (Autumn 1958), "Machiavelli's Prince: Political Science or Political Satire?", The American Scholar (27): 482–491.
- Najemy, John (1993), Between Friends: Discourses of Power and Desire in the Machiavelli-Vettori Letters of 1513–1515, Princeton University Press
- Najemy, John M. (1996), "Baron's Machiavelli and Renaissance Republicanism", American Historical Review, 101 (1): 119–129, doi:10.2307/2169227, JSTOR 2169227.
- Parel, A. J. (Spring 1991). "The Question of Machiavelli's Modernity". The Review of Politics. 53 (2): 320–339. doi:10.1017/S0034670500014649. JSTOR 1407757. S2CID 170629105.
- Parel, Anthony (1972), "Introduction: Machiavelli's Method and His Interpreters", The Political Calculus: Essays on Machiavelli's Philosophy, Toronto: University of Toronto Press, pp. 3–28
- Parsons, William B. (2016), Machiavelli's Gospel, University of Rochester Press, ISBN 978-1580464918
- Pocock, J.G.A. (1975), The Machiavellian Moment: Florentine Political Thought and the Atlantic Republican Tradition, Princeton new ed. 2003, a highly influential study of Discourses and its vast influence; excerpt and text search Archived 18 March 2021 at the Wayback Machine; also online 1975 edition Archived 7 October 2010 at the Wayback Machine
- Pocock, J. G. A. "The Machiavellian Moment Revisited: a Study in History and Ideology": Journal of Modern History 1981 53(1): 49–72. Fulltext: in Jstor Archived 11 September 2018 at the Wayback Machine.
- Rahe, Paul (1992), Republics Ancient and Modern: Classical Republicanism and the American Revolution online edition Archived 23 September 2009 at the Wayback Machine
- Rahe, Paul A. (2006), Machiavelli's Liberal Republican Legacy, Cambridge University Press, ISBN 978-0521851879 Excerpt, reviews and Text search shows Machiavelli's Discourses had a major impact on shaping conservative thought.
- Ruggiero, Guido. Machiavelli in Love: Sex, Self and Society in Renaissance Italy (2007)
- Schaefer, David (1990), The Political Philosophy of Montaigne, Cornell University Press.
- Scott, John T.; Sullivan, Vickie B. (1994). "Patricide and the Plot of the Prince: Cesare Borgia and Machiavelli's Italy". The American Political Science Review. 88 (4): 887–900. doi:10.2307/2082714. ISSN 0003-0554. JSTOR 2082714. S2CID 144798597.
- Skinner, Quentin. The Foundations of Modern Political Thought, v. I, The Renaissance, (1978)
- Soll, Jacob (2005), Publishing The Prince: History, Reading and the Birth of Political Criticism, University of Michigan Press
- Stanford Encyclopedia of Philosophy. Niccolò Machiavelli (2005)
- Strauss, Leo (1987), "Niccolò Machiavelli", in Strauss, Leo; Cropsey, Joseph (eds.), History of Political Philosophy (3rd ed.), University of Chicago Press
- Strauss, Leo (1978) [1958], Thoughts on Machiavelli, Chicago: University of Chicago Press, ISBN 978-0226777023
- Sullivan, Vickie B., ed. (2000), The Comedy and Tragedy of Machiavelli: Essays on the Literary Works, Yale U. Press
- Sullivan, Vickie B. (1996), Machiavelli's Three Romes: Religion, Human Liberty, and Politics Reformed, Northern Illinois University Press
- von Vacano, Diego, "The Art of Power: Machiavelli, Nietzsche and the Making of Aesthetic Political Theory," Lanham MD: Lexington: 2007.
- Thompson, C. Bradley (1995), "John Adams's Machiavellian Moment", The Review of Politics, 57 (3): 389–417, doi:10.1017/S0034670500019689, S2CID 154074090. Also in Rahe (2006).
- Whelan, Frederick G. (2004), Hume and Machiavelli: Political Realism and Liberal Thought, Lexington: Lexington Books
- Wight, Martin (2005). Wight, Gabriele; Porter, Brian (eds.). Four Seminal Thinkers in International Theory: Machiavelli, Grotius, Kant, and Mazzini. Oxford: Oxford University Press. ISBN 978-0199273676.
- Zuckert, Catherine, (2017) "Machiavelli's Politics" Archived 18 November 2022 at the Wayback Machine

=== Italian studies ===
- Barbuto, Marcelo (2005), "Questa oblivione delle cose. Reflexiones sobre la cosmología de Maquiavelo (1469–1527)," Revista Daimon, 34, Universidad de Murcia, pp. 34–52.
- Barbuto, Marcelo (2008), "Discorsi, I, XII, 12–14. La Chiesa romana di fronte alla republica cristiana", Filosofia Politica, 1, Il Mulino, Bologna, pp. 99–116.
- Celli, Carlo (2009), Il carnevale di Machiavelli, Firenze, L.S. Olschki.
- Connell, William J. (2015), Machiavelli nel Rinascimento italiano, Milano, Franco Angeli.
- Giuseppe Leone, "Silone e Machiavelli. Una scuola...che non crea prìncipi", pref. di Vittoriano Esposito, Centro Studi Ignazio Silone, Pescina, 2003.
- Martelli, Mario (2004), "La Mandragola e il suo prologo", Interpres, XXIII, pp. 106–142.
- Martelli, Mario (2003), "Per la definizione della nozione di principe civile", Interpres, XXII.
- Martelli, Mario (2001), "I dettagli della filologia", Interpres XX, pp. 212–271.
- Martelli, Mario (1999a), "Note su Machiavelli", Interpres XVIII, pp. 91–145.
- Martelli, Mario (1999b), Saggio sul Principe, Salerno Editrice, Roma.
- Martelli, Mario (1999c), "Machiavelli e Savonarola: valutazione politica e valutazione religiosa", Girolamo Savonarola. "L´uomo e il frate". Atti del xxxv Convegno storico internazionale (Todi, II-14 ottobre 1998), CISAM, Spoleto, pp. 139–153.
- Martelli, Mario (1998a), Machiavelli e gli storici antichi, osservazioni su alcuni luoghi dei discorsi sopra la prima deca di Tito Livio, Quaderni di Filologia e critica, 13, Salerno Editrice, Roma.
- Martelli, Mario (1998b), "Machiavelli politico amante poeta", Interpres XVII, pp. 211–256.
- Martelli, Mario (1998c), "Machiavelli e Savonarola", Savonarola. Democrazia, tirannide, profezia, a cura di G.C. Garfagnini, Florencia, Sismel-Edizioni del Galluzo, pp. 67–89.
- Martelli, Mario and Bausi, Francesco (1997), "Politica, storia e letteratura: Machiavelli e Guicciardini", Storia della letteratura italiana, E. Malato (ed.), vol. IV. Il primo Cinquecento, Salerno Editrice, Roma, pp. 251–320.
- Martelli, Mario (1985–1986), "Schede sulla cultura di Machiavelli", Interpres VI, pp. 283–330.
- Martelli, Mario (1982) "La logica provvidenzialistica e il capitolo XXVI del Principe", Interpres IV, pp. 262–384.
- Martelli, Mario (1974), "L´altro Niccolò di Bernardo Machiavelli", Rinascimento, XIV, pp. 39–100.
- Sasso, Gennaro (1993), Machiavelli: storia del suo pensiero politico, II vol., Bologna, Il Mulino,
- Sasso, Gennaro (1987–1997) Machiavelli e gli antichi e altri saggi, 4 vols., Milano, R. Ricciardi

=== Editions ===
==== Collections ====
- Gilbert, Allan H. ed. Machiavelli: The Chief Works and Others, (3 vol. 1965), the standard scholarly edition
- Bondanella, Peter, and Mark Musa, eds. The Portable Machiavelli (1979)
- Penman, Bruce. The Prince and Other Political Writings, (1981)
- Wootton, David, ed. (1994), Selected political writings of Niccolò Machiavelli, Indianapolis: Hackett Pubs. excerpt and text search Archived 16 March 2021 at the Wayback Machine

==== The Prince ====
- Machiavelli, Niccolò (2016), The Prince with Related Documents (2nd ed.), Boston: Bedford/St. Martin's, ISBN 978-1319048921. Translated by William J. Connell
- Machiavelli, Niccolò (2015), The Prince, US: Adagio Press, ISBN 978-0996767705. Edited by W. Garner. Translated by Luigi Ricci. Excerpt and text search Archived 18 November 2022 at the Wayback Machine
- Machiavelli, Niccolò (2003) [1961], The Prince, London: Penguin, ISBN 978-0140449150. Translated by George Bull
- Machiavelli, Niccolò (2009), The Prince, translated by Tim Parks, London: Penguin, ISBN 978-1846140440
- Machiavelli, Niccolò (1992), The Prince, New York: W.W. Norton & Company, ISBN 0393962202. Translated by Robert M. Adams (Norton Critical Edition, 2nd ed., with "Backgrounds, Interpretations, Marginalia").
- Machiavelli, Niccolò (2006), El Principe/The Prince: Comentado Por Napoleon Bonaparte / Commentaries by Napoleon Buonaparte, Mestas Ediciones. Translated into Spanish by Marina Massa-Carrara
- Machiavelli, Niccolò (1985), The Prince, University of Chicago Press. Translated by Harvey Mansfield
- Machiavelli, Niccolò (1995), The Prince, Everyman. Translated and Edited by Stephen J. Milner. Introduction, Notes and other critical apparatus by J.M. Dent.
- The Prince ed. by Peter Bondanella (1998) 101 pp online edition Archived 25 April 2010 at the Wayback Machine
- The Prince ed. by Rufus Goodwin and Benjamin Martinez (2003) excerpt and text search Archived 17 March 2021 at the Wayback Machine
- The Prince (2007) excerpt and text search Archived 10 March 2021 at the Wayback Machine
- Machiavelli, Niccolò. The Prince, (1908 edition tr by W. K. Marriott) Gutenberg edition Archived 24 September 2009 at the Wayback Machine
- Marriott, W. K. (2008), The Prince, Red and Black Publishers ISBN 978-1934941003
- Il principe (2006) ed. by Mario Martelli and Nicoletta Marcelli, Edizione Nazionale delle Opere di Niccolò Machiavelli, Salerno Editrice, Roma.

==== The Discourses on Livy ====
- Discourses on Livy. Translated by Mansfield, Harvey C.; Tarcov, Nathan (ebook ed.). University of Chicago Press. 27 February 2009. ISBN 978-0-226-50033-1.
  - Mansfield, Harvey C.; Tarcov, Nathan. Introduction. In Machiavelli (2009), pp. xvii–xlv.
- Discorsi sopra la prima deca di Tito Livio (2001), ed. by Francesco Bausi, Edizione Nazionale delle Opere di Niccolò Machiavelli, II vol. Salerno Editrice, Roma.
- The Discourses, online 1772 edition Archived 15 August 2012 at the Wayback Machine
- The Discourses, tr. with introduction and notes by L. J. Walker (2 vol 1950).
- Machiavelli, Niccolò (1531). The Discourses. Translated by Leslie J. Walker, S.J, revisions by Brian Richardson (2003). London: Penguin Books. ISBN 0-14-044428-9
- The Discourses, edited with an introduction by Bernard Crick (1970).

==== The Art of War ====
- The Seven Books on the Art of War online 1772 edition Archived 16 July 2012 at the Wayback Machine
- The Art of War, University of Chicago Press, edited with new translation and commentary by Christopher Lynch (2003)
- The Art of War online 1775 edition
- The Art of War, Niccolò Machiavelli. Da Capo press edition, 2001, with introduction by Neal Wood.

==== Florentine Histories ====
- History of Florence online 1901 edition Archived 20 September 2008 at the Wayback Machine
- Reform of Florence online 1772 edition Archived 15 August 2012 at the Wayback Machine
- Machiavelli, Niccolò (1988), Florentine Histories, Princeton University Press. Translation by Laura F. Banfield and Harvey Mansfield Jr.

==== Correspondence ====
- Epistolario privado. Las cartas que nos desvelan el pensamiento y la personalidad de uno de los intelectuales más importantes del Renacimiento, Juan Manuel Forte (edición y traducción), Madrid, La Esfera de los Libros, 2007, 435 págs, ISBN 978-8497346610
- The Private Correspondence of Niccolò Machiavelli, ed. by Orestes Ferrara; (1929) online edition Archived 23 June 2009 at the Wayback Machine
- Machiavelli, Niccolò (1996), Machiavelli and his friends: Their personal correspondence, Northern Illinois University Press. Translated and edited by James B. Atkinson and David Sices.
- Also see Najemy (1993).

Poetry and comedy

- Machiavelli, Niccolò (1985), Comedies of Machiavelli, University Press of New England Bilingual edition of The Woman from Andros, The Mandrake, and Clizia, edited by David Sices and James B. Atkinson.
- Hoeges, Dirk. Niccolò Machiavelli. Dichter-Poeta. Mit sämtlichen Gedichten, deutsch/italienisch. Con tutte le poesie, tedesco/italiano, Reihe: Dialoghi/Dialogues: Literatur und Kultur Italiens und Frankreichs, Band 10, Peter Lang Verlag, Frankfurt/M. u.a. 2006, ISBN 3631546696.
