= Casina (play) =

Comedy or farce by Titus Maccius Plautus

- Original language: Latin
- Written by: Plautus
- Characters: Olympio - slave of Lysidamus; Chalinus - slave of Cleostrata; Cleostrata - wife of Lysidamus; Pardalisca - maid of Cleostrata; Myrrhina - wife of Alcesimus; Lysidamus – Athenian gentleman Alcesimus – neighbour Citrio or Chytrio - cook
- Genre: Roman comedy
- Setting: a street in Athens, before the houses of Lysidamus and Alcesimus

Casina is a Latin comedy or farce by the early Roman playwright Titus Maccius Plautus. Set in ancient Athens, the play describes how an Athenian gentleman and his son are both in love with the same slave-girl, Casina. The old man tries to conduct a secret affair with Casina by having her marry his farm-manager; but his plan is foiled by his wife, who dresses her son's armour-bearer up as the bride and sends him into the bridal chamber in place of Casina.

The play is probably one of Plautus's later comedies, because of the amount of song which it contains. There is also a mention of Bacchanalian revels, which are said no longer to take place; this may be a reference to a Roman senatorial decree of 187 BC forbidding such revels. If so, it would date the play to shortly before Plautus's death in 184 BC.

According to the prologue (which appears to have been written for a revival some years after Plautus's death), the play is adapted from a comedy called Klerumenoi ("The Lot-Casters") by the Greek playwright Diphilus.

The name "Casina" (pronounced Latin pronunciation: [ˈkäs̠ɪnä] with three short vowels) is thought to be related to casia, a scented spice similar to cinnamon, one of several references to scents and foods in the play.

Unlike other Plautus plays, where references to homosexuality are either fleeting or present as jokes directed at characters with identifiable feminine characteristics, in Casina it has a more prominent and less stereotypical role. Apart from the climax of the play, in which two men attempt to have sex with a third man disguised as a bride, the character of Lysidamus, who is not described as having identifiable feminine characteristics, is bisexual and makes several references in the play to his carnal desire for his male slave Olympio.

== Plot ==
The action takes place on the streets of Athens, and all the characters are Greek. The plot revolves about a beautiful girl, Casina, who was abandoned at the door of Lysidamus and his wife Cleostrata, and has been raised as a slave. Euthynicus, son of Lysidamus, has fallen in love with Casina and wants her to marry his armour-bearer Chalinus so that he can enjoy her favours as a concubine. His father Lysidamus, however, desires Casina as his own concubine, and plans to have her marry his farm-manager Olympio instead. Cleostrata opposes his plan, and wants Casina to marry Chalinus to save her for her son.

To resolve the situation, Lysidamus proposes to draw lots (the play is also known as The Lot-Drawers), but Olympio wins. Chalinus discovers that Lysidamus plans to sleep with Casina in the neighbor's house before Olympio takes her to the farm. When Cleostrata learns of this, she dresses Chalinus as Casina and humiliates both Olympio and Lysidamus by taking advantage of the darkened bedroom in her neighbor's home where Lysidamus' affair was to take his wife, and his sins have been exposed to the public. Cleostrata takes him back and life returns to normal. There follows a brief epilogue in which it is explained that Euthynicus will return from the country and will indeed marry Casina, who was really a free-born Athenian when she was taken into the family.

Many of the characters in Casina are stock characters of Greek and Roman comedy, such as the old man chasing after the young slave woman.

== Metrical structure ==
Plautus' plays are traditionally divided into five acts. However, it is not thought that the act-divisions go back to Plautus's time, since no manuscript contains them before the 15th century. Also, the acts themselves do not always match the structure of the plays, which is often more clearly shown by the variation in metres.

A common pattern in Plautus is for a metrical section to begin with iambic senarii (which were unaccompanied by music), followed optionally by a musical passage or song, and ending with trochaic septenarii, which were recited or sung to the music of a pair of pipes known as tibiae.

The structure of the play is as follows, taking A = iambic senarii, B = other metres, C = trochaic septenarii:

ABC, AC, AC, AB, AC, BABC

=== The argument over Casina ===
- Act 1 (1–143): iambic senarii (125 lines)

The Prologue explains that in the nearby house lives a girl who was exposed 16 years earlier as a baby, then found by a slave and raised by the mistress of the house. Now both the father and the son of the house are in love with her. The father wishes her to be married to his farm-manager, and so be available for him to enjoy as a concubine whenever he wishes; the son, for similar reasons, wishes her to be married to his armour-bearer. The mother has found out about her husband's plans, and is supporting her son. At the time of the play the son is away, having been sent on a trip by his father to get him out of the way. The slave who found Casina, and who knows the secret of who Casina's mother is, is apparently sick in bed.

The two slaves, Olympio the farm-manager, and Chalinus, the armour-bearer, argue in the street. Each declares that he is going to marry the slave-girl Casina. Olympio fantasises about how Chalinus will one day be sent to work on the farm and will be forced to hear Olympio and Casina making love.

- Act 2.1–2.3 (144-251): polymetric song (ba, cr, an) (108 lines)

The mother, Cleostrata, orders the store-room to be sealed, and tells her maid Pardalisca that she is determined to punish her husband for his behaviour by refusing to cook for him. She is on the way to see the neighbour.

Her neighbour, Myrrhina, by chance is coming to see her. Cleostrata tries to tell Myrrhina about her husband's behaviour, but Myrrhina is scandalised to hear that she owns a maidservant, and advises her to say nothing to her husband, for fear that he may divorce her. Myrrhina goes home when she sees Lysidamus coming.

Cleostrata's husband Lysidamus approaches, singing of the joys of being in love. He tries to touch her, but she addresses him in a very cross mood, asking why he smells of perfume and accusing him of drinking.

- Act 2.3–2.4 (252-308): trochaic septenarii (56 lines)

They start to argue about Casina. Lysidamus insists that she must marry his farm-manager Olympio, and Cleostrata protests that the maidservants are her business and that to please their son, Casina must marry Chalinus. Lysidamus says he will persuade Chalinus. Cleostrata disagrees and goes to fetch Chalinus. When Chalinus comes out, Lysidamus offers him his freedom if he will give up Casina, but Chalinus refuses. Lysidamus now suggests that Chalinus should fetch an urn and they will draw lots.

=== Olympio wins the lottery ===
- Act 2.5 (309–352): iambic senarii (44 lines)

While Chalinus goes to fetch the urn, Olympio comes out talking to Cleostrata (who is still indoors) and telling her that he will not give up Casina even for his freedom. Olympio complains that everyone will hate him for marrying Casina, and he doubts if Cleostrata will give up easily. Lysidamus reassures him that the matter will be decided by lot.

- Act 2.6 (353–423): trochaic septenarii (71 lines)

Chalinus and Cleostrata come out. Chalinus is carrying the urn and some wooden lots. He starts arguing with Olympio. Lysidamus orders Olympio to hit Chalinus in the face. Cleostrata orders Chalinus to retaliate in kind, which he does. Eventually they are ready, and Cleostrata draws a lot out of the urn: it is Olympio's. She is obliged to obey her husband.

=== Chalinus discovers Lysidamus's plans ===
- Act 2.7–2.8 (424–514): iambic senarii (91 lines)

Alone on stage, Chalinus speaks of his unhappiness. Olympio and Lysidamus come outside without noticing Chalinus. Chalinus secretly listens as Olympio suggests that Chalinus should be sent to work on the farm as a punishment. Lysidamus tries to kiss Olympio and hug him, but Olympio pushes him away. Lysidamus says he can't wait to sleep with Casina. He tells Olympio that he has arranged with the neighbour Alcesimus that he will lend his house to Lysidamus to spend the night with Casina. Alcesimus will be away, and Myrrhina will stay with Cleostrata to help with the wedding party. He gives Olympio a purse and tells him to go and buy various kinds of fish. Then he goes into Alcesimus's house and Olympio goes to the market. When they have gone, Chalinus determines to tell Cleostrata what he has heard.

- Act 3.1–3.2 (515–562): trochaic septenarii (48 lines)

Lysidamus and Alcesimus come out from Alcesimus's house. Alcesimus promises that he will send all his servants out of the house to help with the wedding party, so the coast will be clear. Lysidamus departs towards the forum.

Cleostrata comes out from her house, saying she will spoil her husband's plans by not inviting Myrrhina. Alcesimus meets her and says Myrrhina is ready and expecting to be invited, but Cleostrata says Myrrhina is not needed after all. She goes back inside. Alcesimus is annoyed to have been misled by Lysidamus, and returns to tell his wife the news.

=== Pardalisca's trick ===
- Act 3.3–3.4 (563–620): iambic senarii (57 lines)

Lysidamus enters. He says he has wasted the day at the forum unsuccessfully pleading in court for a friend. He meets Cleostrata, who lies to him that she had invited Myrrhina, but that Alcesimus had refused to allow her to go. She goes inside. Alcesimus now appears, and the two men argue about these contradictory versions of events. Eventually Alcesimus grudgingly agrees to send his wife across using the out-of-sight back door, although he is obviously very cross with Lysidamus. Suddenly Lysidamus hears a commotion from his house.

- Act 3.5–3.6 (621–758): mixed (cr, an, ba, an) (138 lines)

Cleostrata's maid Pardalisca comes rushing out, apparently in great distress, lamenting in cretic metre in an entertaining parody of tragic style. She falls into Lysidamus's arms, and tells him that Casina has got hold of a sword and is threatening to kill whoever tries to go to bed with her that day. Lysidamus makes a slip and asks "She's going to kill me?" Meanwhile Pardalisca, speaking aside to the audience, tells them that her play-acting is all a trick thought up by Cleostrata. She goes on to tell Lysidamus that Casina in fact has two swords, one to kill him and the other to kill Olympio. Lysidamus in alarm offers her a reward of slippers and a gold ring if she can persuade Casina to put down her sword.

Pardalisca goes inside and Olympio arrives with provisions and a cook whom he has hired in the market. He warns the cook to make sure his assistants don't steal anything. Lysidamus grabs Olympio and begs him to wait. Olympio pushes him off, complaining of his bad breath. When Lysidamus claims to be Olympio's master, Olympio reminds him that he, Olympio, is now a free man. Lysidamus humiliates himself by saying that he himself is Olympio's slave and asks him how soon he'll get his entertainment. He tells Olympio about Casina's sword, but Olympio assures him that it is just a woman's trick and there is nothing to fear. They go inside together.

=== The wedding begins ===
- Act 4.1–4.2 (759–797): iambic senarii (39 lines)

Pardalisca comes out and describes the scene inside to the audience. The old man is impatiently bidding the cooks to make haste; the cooks are deliberately slowing things down; Olympio is strutting about in his wedding clothes; and meanwhile in the bedroom the women are dressing up Chalinus as Olympio's bride.

Lysidamus now comes out, telling his wife (who is still inside) to get on with the dinner; he himself is going to escort the bride and groom to the farm to make sure they arrive safely. He sees Pardalisca and orders her to go back inside at once.

- Act 4.3 (798–814): trochaic septenarii (15 lines) (with 2 ia4)

Olympio comes out with a pipe-player, complaining that he hasn't had time to eat or drink anything. Oympio and Lysidamus sing a wedding song. Lysidamus worries whether he will be able to perform in bed but Olympio reassures him.

=== The old man is fooled ===
- Act 4.4 (815–46): an, ba, an (32 lines)

Pardalisca and some other maids escort Chalinus out, dressed as a bride, and remind him that a wife's job is to make sure she rules her husband. Olympio and Lysidamus order the maids to go back inside, then, while holding torches, both try to embrace the bride, who stamps on Olympio's foot.

- Act 4.4 (847–54): iambic senarii (8 lines)

The "bride" Chalinus fights Olympio off with an elbow (cubito), and Lysidamus jokes that this means that she wants to go to bed (cubitum). They go inside Alcesimus's house.

- Act 5.1–5.3 (855–962): ba, an (108 lines)

Myrrhina and Pardalisca come out, after a good meal. Myrrhina says she has never laughed so much. She tells Pardalisca to keep watch at Alcesimus's door. Olympio comes out without his wedding gown, lamenting that he has made a compete fool of himself. Pardalisca asks him where his new bride is. He tells her that he decided to go first into the darkened room; but when he searched the bride for a sword he discovered what felt like a sword hilt, but not so cold. Pardalisca teases him by asking whether it was perhaps a radish or a cucumber, but he says he doesn't think it was any vegetable. The bride had kicked him off the bed and he had escaped without his cloak and let the old man go in to have his turn. Soon Lysidamus himself comes out in total shame. He declares he daren't go back to his wife and is going to run away like a slave.

- Act 5.4 (963–1018): trochaic septenarii (54 lines)

At this moment Chalinus comes out and orders him to return to the bedroom; at the same time Cleostrata approaches from the other side, trapping her husband. She asks him what he has done with his stick and cloak. He begs Myrrhina to intercede for him and begs his wife for forgiveness. Cleostrata agrees. At the end of the play one of the characters informs the audience that Casina will eventually be recognised as Myrrhina's daughter, and so is not a slave but a freewoman; she will marry Lysidamus's son Euthynicus when he returns.

== Bibliography ==
- Christenson, David M. (2019). Plautus: Casina. Bloomsbury Academic. ISBN 9781350020535
- Connors, Catherine (1997). "Scents and Sensibility in Plautus' Casina". The Classical Quarterly, Vol. 47, No. 1, pp. 305–309.
- de Melo, Wolfgang (2011). Plautus, Vol II: Casina; The Casket Comedy; Curculio; Epidicus; The Two Menaechmuses. Loeb Classical Library
- Franko, George Fredric (1999). "Imagery and Names in Plautus' Casina. The Classical Journal, Vol. 95, No. 1, pp. 1-17.
- MacCary, W. T., Willcock, M. M. (1976). Plautus: Casina. Cambridge Greek and Latin Classics.
- Moodie, Erin (2021). "Review of Christenson (2019)". Bryn Mawr Classical Review.
- Moore, T. J. (2012). Music in Roman Comedy. Cambridge University Press.
- Traill, Ariana (2011). "Casina and The Comedy of Errors.” International Journal of the Classical Tradition, 18(4), 497–522.
- Way, Mahalia L. (2000) "Violence and the Performance of Class in Plautus' Casina." Helios, vol. 27, no. 2, pp. 187+.
