= Antonio da Venafro =

Italian jurist

Antonio Giordano (1459–1530), called Antonio da Venafro, was a minister of Siena in the Italian Renaissance, who worked for Pandolfo Petrucci and is mentioned in chapter 22 of Niccolò Machiavelli's The Prince.

== History ==
Da Venafro was born in 1459 in Venafro, Molise. He moved to Siena and attended the university there graduating in jurisprudence. In 1488 Venafro was elected professor of law at the University of Siena. In November 1493 Antonio was elected Appellate Judge. As such he was arrested by the avant-garde of Charles VIII and forced to follow them in their march to Rome. He was freed a few days later only by a direct order of the King himself. A trusted adviser and private secretary of the Lord of Siena, Pandolfo Petrucci, he was named by the latter counselor and minister. In the month of October 1502 Venafro represented Pandolfo Petrucci during the Magione conspiracy, and later he went to Imola with Paolo Orsini, where a peace agreement was signed between Cesare Borgia and the conspirators of La Magione represented by Paolo Orsini.

On 23 January 1506 Venafro met with Machiavelli, who proposed entrusting the resolution of the dispute over Montepulciano to the French monarchy.

Venafro was a statesman of high calibre, appreciated and respected by men such as Guicciardini, Vettori and Niccolò Machiavelli. In chapter 22 of The Prince, where private counselors are discussed, Machiavelli describes Venafro as an excellent minister.

In 1515, under constant pressure by Pope Leo X, Antonio left Siena and returned to his native town of Venafro. But a few years later, in 1519, Antonio moved to Naples there he became a member of the Consiglio Collaterale and professor of jurisprudence at the University of Naples. He died there in 1530.
