= Fabio Orsini =

Italian condottiero

- Coat of arms
- Born: 1476; Rome, Italy
- Died: 29 December 1503 (aged 26–27); Garigliano
- Noble family: Orsini
- Father: Paolo Orsini
- Occupation: Condottiero, mercenary and warrior

Fabio Orsini (1476 - 29 December 1503) was an Italian condottiero and lord of Mentana. He was son of Paolo Orsini, a condottiero in service to the Papal States who was murdered in 1503 by Cesare Borgia.

Following his involvement in the Magione conspiracy against Cesare Borgia, Paolo Orsini was arrested and Fabio fled. The following year, Fabio Orsini and Ludovico of Pitigliano returned with 400 horse and 500 foot soldiers to challenge Cesare, but an alliance between the Borgia and the Colonna families allowed Cesare to prevail, and on 24 August Ludovico was defeated, forcing Fabio to flee once again.

Fabio eventually died of a head wound on 29 December 1503, while fighting in the service of the Kingdom of Spain at the battle of Garigliano.

== Biography ==
Fabio Orsini was born in Rome to Paolo Orsini. He was trained in the arts of combat from a very early age and, at the age of eighteen, he entered Montepulciano fighting among the Sienese forces.

In 1498, the young Orsini allied himself with his cousin, Bartolomeo d'Alviano, to fight the Savelli, a rival family. In the same year, his career influenced his private life: to further his military career in the papal army, he married Jeronima Borgia in 1497, cousin of Lucrezia Borgia, thus joining the ranks of the papal family. Fabio was on friendly terms with Cesare Borgia for a certain period, greatly improving the political status of the Orsini family and increasing their influence.

Fabio seemed willing to help his new relatives by marriage. In 1499, during the military campaign in Romagna, Fabio freed a friend imprisoned in Tor di Nona, demonstrating that his loyalty to the Borgias was not so strong after all. This angered Cesare, who severed ties with the Orsini family, while allowing Fabio to continue his career in the army.

In the months that followed, Fabio and his followers were attacked by the army of Commander Micheletto Corella, and Cesare Borgia subjugated the Orsini family once and for all by killing Fabio's father, Paolo. Fabio fled and unsuccessfully attacked Michelotto Corella's army, forcing him to roam the countryside as an outlaw, raiding the countryside and plundering papal outposts, despite the bounties placed on him by Alexander VI. Subsequently, upon the latter's death, he rejoined the ranks of the papal army with the support of the new pope, Pope Julius II. In December 1503, he arrested Cesare Borgia, accusing him of murder and incest.

== Bibliography ==
- Gregorovius, Ferdinand (10 January 2010). History of the City of Rome in the Middle Ages. Vol. Part 2. Translated by Hamilton, Annie. Cambridge University Press. p. 428. ISBN 9781108015110.
