= Senigallia massacre =

Series of executions in 1503

The Senigallia massacre (Italian: La strage di Senigallia) was a series of executions perpetrated on the orders of Cesare Borgia as revenge for the Magione conspiracy, where powerful princes, most of whom were Borgia's former military allies and commanders, plotted to remove him from power to prevent him from gaining too much influence over Italy. Borgia, having misled his enemies into believing he was seeking reconciliation, lured Oliverotto Euffreducci, Vitellozzo Vitelli, Paolo and Francesco Orsini to a dinner in Senigallia (then Sinigaglia) on 31 December 1502 to discuss military matters. At a signal, Borgia's guards captured the four men, with Vitellozzo and Oliverotto being garroted that same night by Michelotto Corella. The Orsini brothers were killed a few weeks later on 18 January 1503. Niccolò Machiavelli, who was himself a physical witness to many of the events, chronicled the killings in his works The Description and Il Principe.

== Overview ==
Cesare Borgia, aided by his father, Pope Alexander VI, engaged in a plan to take over the Romagna region, depose the existing rulers and bring the province under his control. He enlisted the help of mercenaries, including those supplied by the Orsini family, among other commanders.

Borgia's plan to take over the Romagna was not received well by other local Italian lords, who felt uneasy as Borgia was increasing his already dominant empire over central Italy, and they believed that Cesare would eventually target them as he had a reputation for betrayal amongst those he allied himself with. This led the lords, which included Oliverotto Euffreducci, Vitellozzo Vitelli, Gian Paolo Baglioni, Pandolfo Petrucci, Guidobaldo da Montefeltro, Giovanni Bentivoglio (through his son Ermes) and the leading members of Orsini family to plot against Borgia with the aim of having him either killed, or at the very least taken prisoner. Vitelli vowed to kill Borgia personally should he ever be approached by him. Baglioni warned that if they did not act, they risked being "devoured one by one by the dragon". The anti-Borgia league could have defied both Cesare and Pope Alexander VI, but their distrust for one another led to the coalition being divided easily.

== The capture and execution of the leaders ==
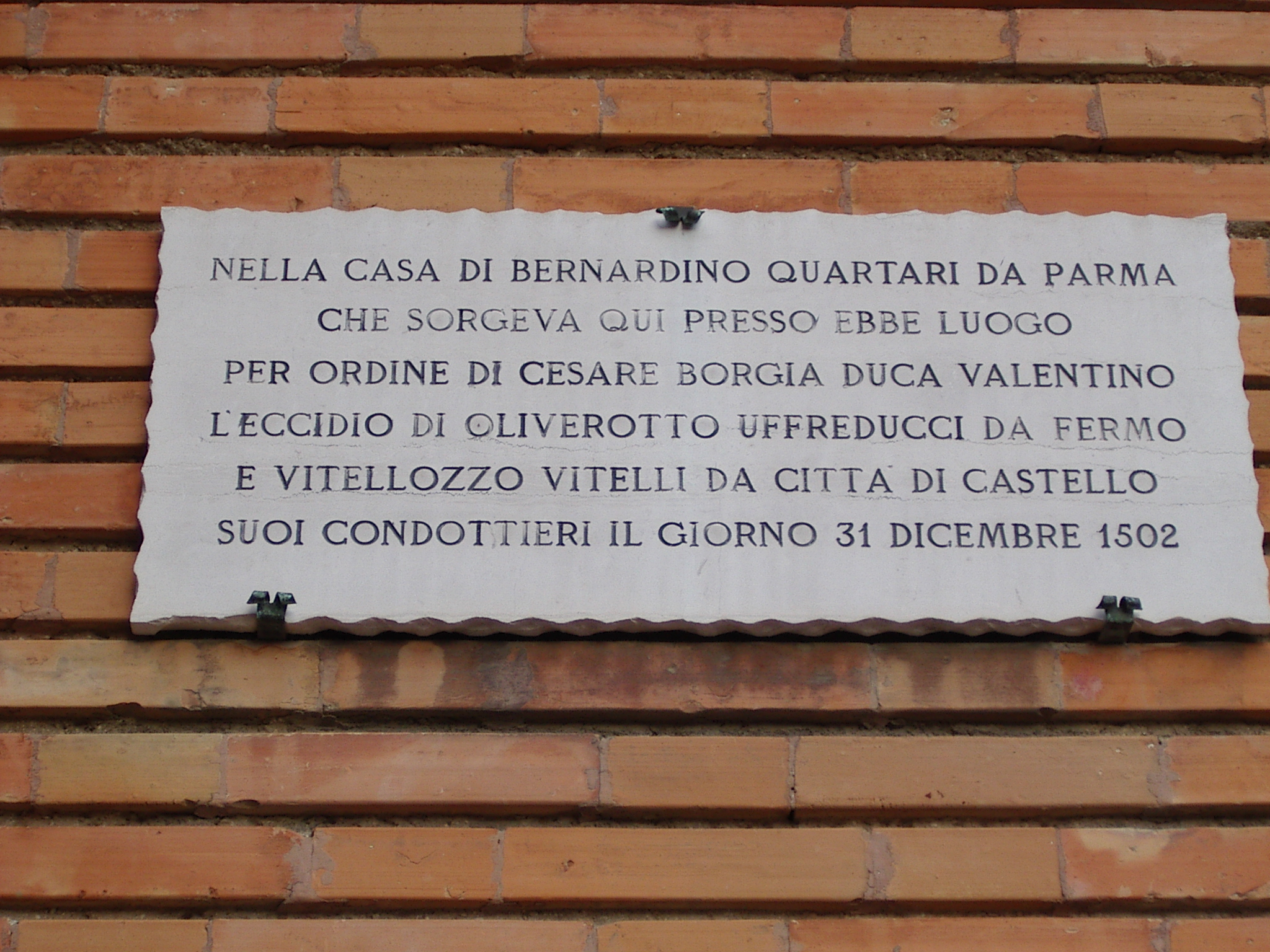
Commemorative plaque of the massacre

Cesare was able to persuade the leaders to agree to a truce: Paolo Orsini, lured with bribes (the duke gave him gifts and horses), reached an agreement with Borgia, which was key in also convincing Vitellozzo and the other leaders to submit to the request for peace. The execution of the unpopular Remiro de Lorqua also persuaded the conspirators and put them at ease, though it was later revealed that de Lorqua was killed due to him being a participant in several anti-Borgia plots. The exceptions included Giampaolo Baglioni, who refused to sign the agreement, Pandolfo Petrucci, whom also did not trust Cesare, Guidobaldo of Montefeltro and Giovanni Bentivoglio, lord of Bologna. Many of the conspirators tried to downplay their role in the conspiracy through sending ostensibly apologetic messages to Cesare.

The duke, leaving Imola on 10 December, after spending a few days in Cesena, set out for Senigallia (a possession of the Della Rovere family), which he intended to conquer, where a regiment commanded by Andrea Doria was defending the citadel. Paolo Orsini, who had acted as guarantor for Borgia, convinced all the former conspirators to meet on the night of 31 December 1502 for a banquet in the city of Senigallia.

Valentino met the leaders and together they entered Senigallia, outside which Oliverotto's few troops were camped. Cesare, noticing Oliverotto's absence, ordered Michelotto Corella, his lieutenant (who had conveniently arranged Borgia's apartment in a palace in the city), to reach him, inviting him to come with him to meet the duke. The latter asked his companions to enter with him to prepare plans for the subsequent battles. When they had settled in, Cesare secretly left the room and at his signal the leaders were surrounded by armed men and taken prisoner. Upon receiving news of the arrests of the conspirators, Machiavelli sent a report to Florence stating "in my view they will not be alive tomorrow morning".

Vitellozzo and Oliverotto were killed during the night between 31 December and 1 January by Michelotto Corella, having been seated back to back on a bench, and strangled with a cord. After they were killed, Borgia's soldiers robbed the troops of Oliverotto, killing some of them in the process. Borgia's soldiers came close to sacking Senigallia itself, getting so uncontrollable that it even forced Cesare to execute a few disobedient soldiers. Paolo Orsini and the Duke of Gravina were initially held by Borgia at Castel della Pieve, due to the arrest by his father Alexander VI of Cardinal Orsini (supporter of a conspiracy against the Pope and who had hosted the council of Magione), of Rinaldo Orsini and Jacopo Santacroce, a Roman gentleman who supported the Orsini faction (the latter were later released, while Cardinal Orsini was poisoned in Castel Sant'Angelo). After a brief imprisonment, Paolo and the Duke of Gravina were killed on 18 January 1503.

Other leaders who participated in the conspiracy but who never trusted Borgia's deceptive reconciliation ruse were nevertheless quickly overthrown. Baglioni managed to avoid Duke Valentino's wrath and he fled to Siena with Pandolfo Petrucci, then he took refuge in Lucca, Pisa, then finally Florence. Pandolfo Petrucci suspected his life was in danger and avoided the meeting, but nevertheless also fled his lordship in Siena in January 1503 in order to avoid Borgia's killers. He subsequently resided in Lucca. Bentivoglio managed to obtain a secret peace deal with Pope Alexander VI, while Guidobaldo da Montefeltro fled to Venice.

The killings were celebrated throughout Italy, and also by several European rulers, including the king of France, and it prompted Paolo Giovio (bishop of Nocera) to refer to the act as a "magnificent deception" ("bellissimo inganno").

Machiavelli, who was personally in Senigallia during the events as part of a diplomatic mission, was influenced by these events to the extent that he would later write a political work,The Description, describing the ways Borgia entrapped the leaders of the conspiracy. He would also expand further on Borgia's overall career in chapter 7 of The Prince, and used Borgia's action towards the condottieri as a model for princes who wish to lay the foundations for their states.
