= Micheletto Corella =

Valencian condottiero (died 1508)

- Miguel de Corella
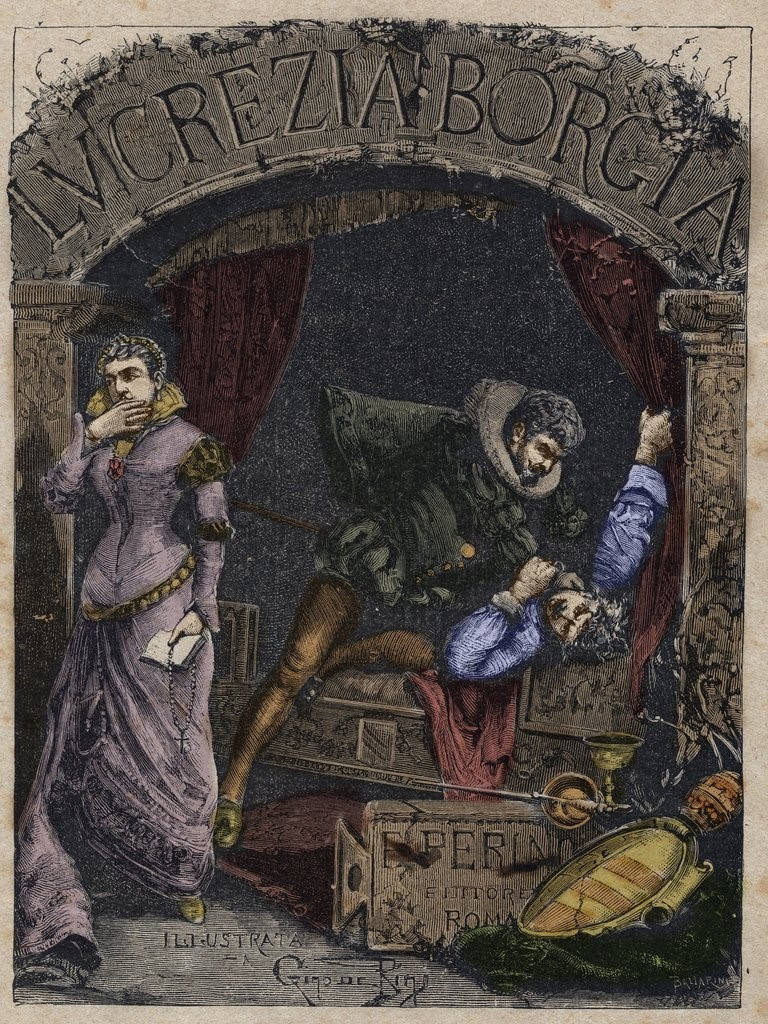
- Born: Valencia, Kingdom of Valencia
- Died: February 1508 (aged 38); Milan, Italy
- Other names: Micheletto Coreglia; Michele de Corella
- Occupation: Condottiero

Micheletto Corella (Micheletto Coreglia, Michele de Corella or Miguel de Corella) was a Valencian condottiero. He served the House of Borgia before being killed in Milan in February 1508. He was one of Cesare Borgia's trusted associates, often being called upon for military endeavors.

== Biography ==
Known as Valentino's executioner, he and Cesare Borgia were thought to be close friends since childhood, going on to accompany one another during their studies at the University of Pisa.

On 23 December 1499, a Don Michele de Corella and the Bishop of Trani were left in Forlì as lieutenants in Cesare's army around the time of the seizure of Forlì.

In March 1502, Corella was left by Cesare as his governor in Piombino. Corella was then dispatched to Pesaro with Ramiro de Lorqua under the order of Cesare Borgia in October 1502. With his lances, on his way to Pesaro, Corella heard of the insurgence of the rebelling Fossombrone and Pergola, and ventured to those towns to sack them pitilessly as punishment.

Niccolò Machiavelli described a conversation Corella had with Oliverotto da Fermo on 31 December 1502: "Therefore Don Michele rode off and joined Oliverotto, telling him that it was not right to keep his men out of their quarters, because these might be taken up by the men of the duke; and he advised him to send them at once to their quarters and to come himself to meet the duke".

On the night of 31 December 1502, Vitellozzo Vitelli and Oliverotto da Fermo, who had been arrested on Cesare's orders, were strangled to death, supposedly by Corella (hinted in Machiavelli's letter of 31 December).

In November 1503, Corella and della Volpe went north with seven hundred horsemen to support Cesare's Romagnuoli but the group were defeated in Tuscany by the army of Gianpaolo Baglioni. After Corella and della Volpe were taken prisoner in 1503, Corella was first imprisoned in Florence and then in Rome where he was questioned and tortured. However, he refused to reveal the many secrets he knew about the Borgias.

He was liberated by Pope Julius II in 1505, and thanks to Machiavelli's mediation, was hired by Florence to oversee the Bargello. He held this position for two years, until 1507.

Corella was killed in Milan in 1508 by fellow countrymen, although the instigator is unknown.

The Italian-English novelist and historian Rafael Sabatini described Micheletto Corella as follows: "Corella was a captain of foot, a soldier of fortune, who from the earliest days of Cesare's military career had followed the duke's fortunes – the very man who is alleged to have strangled Alfonso of Aragon by Cesare's orders. He is generally assumed to have been a Spaniard, and is commonly designated as Micheletto, or Don Miguel; but Alvisi supposes him, from his name of Corella, to have been a Venetian, and he tells us that by his fidelity to Cesare and the implicit manner in which he executed his master's orders, he earned – as is notorious – considerable hatred".

== Portrayals in popular culture ==
=== Film ===
- The 1922 German film Lucrezia Borgia, starring Paul Wegener as Micheletto Corella
- The 2006 film Los Borgia starring actor Antonio Dechent as Miguel Corella

=== Television ===
- The 1981 BBC series The Borgias, starring actor Maurice O'Connell as Micheletto Corella
- The 2011 Showtime series The Borgias, starring actor Sean Harris as Micheletto
- The 2011 Canal+ series Borgia, starring actor Petr Vanēk as Don Miguel de Corella

=== Literature ===
- The Family, a novel by Mario Puzo
- Cantarella, a manga by You Higuri
- The Borgias by Alexandre Dumas, père
- Blood & Beauty: The Borgias, a novel by Sarah Dunant
- Assassin's Creed: Brotherhood, a novel by Oliver Bowden
- City of God by Cecelia Holland
- Borgia, by Milo Manara (artist) & Alejandro Jodorowsky (writer), serialized graphic novel depicting the story of the Borgia family.
- Cesare by Fuyumi Soryo (manga)
- O César o nada by Manuel Vázquez Montalbán
- Mémoires horrifiques et burlesques d'un tueur, a bande dessinée by Bernard Seyer
- The Borgia Chronicles, a series by Kate Quinn
- Prince of Foxes, by Samuel Shellabarger
- The Shame of Motley, by Rafael Sabatini
- A Matter of Taste, by Fred Saberhagen, part of Fred Saberhagen's Dracula series
- Dark Intelligence, The War Factory, and Infinity Engine (the Transformations Trilogy) by Neal Asher – Micheletto's Garrotte is the name of advanced Polity warship and the sentient AI (Artificial Intelligence) controlling it.

=== Games ===
- Micheletto Corella is an antagonist in Assassin's Creed: Brotherhood.

== Sources ==
- Dionisotti, Carlo (1980). "Machiavelli, Cesare Borgia e don Micheletto". Machiavellerie. Storia e fortuna di Machiavelli (in Italian). Torino: Einaudi. ISBN 88-06-50005-8.
- Fusero, Clemente (1972). Green, Peter (ed.). The Borgias. Praeger. ISBN 0-275-57740-6.
- Niccolò Machiavelli, Description of the Manner in which Duke Valentino put Vitellozzo Vitelli, Oliverotto da Fermo, Lord Pagola and the Duke of Gravina to Death
- Niccolò Machiavelli, Letters
- Sabatini, Rafael (1891). The Life of Cesare Borgia Chapter. p. 600.
