= Red Wedding =

Red Wedding may refer to:

- The Red Wedding, a scene from the novel A Storm of Swords by George R. R. Martin
  - "The Rains of Castamere", the Game of Thrones television adaptation of the scene
- Red Wedding (Perugia) — a 1500 massacre in Italy during the wedding of Astorre Baglioni
- Red Wedding (film) — a documentary film about forced marriage under the Khmer Rouge regime.
- The Communist nickname for Wedding (Berlin), after the First World War

== See also ==
- Red as a traditional color of wedding dresses in Asia
- Blood Wedding (disambiguation)
