= Michelotto =

Michelotto is both an Italian surname and a masculine Italian given name. Notable people with the name include:

- Claudio Michelotto (1942–2025), Italian cyclist
- Mattia Michelotto (born 2003), Italian racing driver
- Michelotto Corella (died 1508), Valencian condottiero
