= Ramiro de Lorca =

Spanish condottiero (1452–1502)

Ramiro de Lorca (1452–1502), also spelled Ramiro de Lorqua and referred to by Niccolò Machiavelli as Ramiro d'Orco, was a Spanish condottiero in the service of Cesare Borgia.

== Biography ==
It is unknown when he traveled from the territory of the Crown of Castile to the Italian peninsula and when he began to work for the Borgias, but it is known that by the time of Cesare Borgia's father's election as Pope Alexander VI, Ramiro was already held in confidence by Cesare, so much so that in his role as butler he accompanied Cesare to France in order to serve as a witness to his marriage to Charlotte of Albret in 1498.

In 1500, Cesare and Pope Alexander VI acted on their aspirations to take over the Romagna region by invading many of the local towns. Ramiro de Lorca participated in this campaign and captured the cities of Cesena and Forlì. Giovanni Olivieri, bishop of Isernia, was appointed ruler of the territory, while Ramiro became governor first of Forlì and then of Cesena, capital of the newly proclaimed Grand Duchy of Romagna.

In 1501, Ramiro became governor of the whole province of the Romagna and undertook the pacification of it, imposing a relentless regimen of torture and public executions that brought him the fear and hatred of the public. Disorder was mercilessly repressed, but Ramiro promoted peace between factions and initiated a program of public works.

Meanwhile, a conspiracy arose in La Magione to attempt an assassination on Cesare Borgia. Although Ramiro, the governor of Romagna and vice commander of the Papal army was not involved in the conspiracy, Cesare suspected him and ordered his arrest on 22 December 1502. Under torture, he confessed to attempting to murder Cesare and presented his head to the Orsini and the Baglioni families. In a summary trial, he was accused of corruption, treason, and tyranny and sentenced to death. He was publicly cut in half.

On 26 December 1502, Ramiro was executed in the main plaza of Cesena, his body cut in two and his head stuck on a pike. Niccolò Machiavelli wrote in The Prince that Ramiro's bloody actions were what prompted Cesare to execute him and distance himself from his crimes.
