= The Description =

Book by Niccolò Machiavelli

- Author: Niccolò Machiavelli
- Original title: Descrizione del modo tenuto dal Duca Valentino nello ammazzare Vitellozzo Vitelli, Oliverotto da Fermo, il Signor Pagolo e il duca di Gravina Orsini
- Language: Italian
- Publication date: 1532
- Publication place: Florence
- Text: The Description at Wikisource

A Description of the methods adopted by the Duke Valentino when murdering Vitellozzo Vitelli, Oliverotto da Fermo, the Signor Pagolo, and the Duke di Gravina Orsini is a work by Italian Renaissance political scientist and historian Niccolò Machiavelli. The work describes Cesare Borgia's capture and murder of members of the Orsini family, as well as Vitellozzo Vitelli and Oliverotto da Fermo, former military associates who would later become his rivals. The four men were strangled as revenge for conspiring against Borgia at the castle of La Magione, along with other Italian rulers. Both Vitellozzo Vitelli and Oliverotto da Fermo were strangled on the night of their capture on 31 December 1502.

== Overview ==
Cesare Borgia, supported by his father, Pope Alexander VI, engaged in a campaign to take over the Romagna region, remove the existing rulers and bring the province under his control. He enlisted the help of mercenaries, including those supplied by the Orsini family, among other commanders.

Borgia's plan to take over the Romagna was not received well by other local Italian leaders, who felt uneasy as Borgia was increasing his already dominant empire over central Italy, and they believed that Cesare would eventually target them as he had a reputation for betrayal amongst those he allied himself with. This led the rulers, which included Oliverotto Euffreducci, Vitellozzo Vitelli, Gian Paolo Baglioni, Pandolfo Petrucci, Guidobaldo da Montefeltro, Giovanni Bentivoglio (through his son Ermes) and the leading members of Orsini family to plot against Borgia with the aim of having him killed or taken prisoner.

The conspirators seek an alliance with Florence, which instead supports the Duke through Machiavelli. After the Duke's forces are defeated at Fossombrone, he pretends to seek reconciliation while secretly gathering troops, including 500 French lancers. A peace agreement is reached where the Duke pays 4,000 ducats and promises safety to the Bentivogli, while the rebels agree to restore captured territories and serve him. Following the reconciliation, the Duke of Urbino flees to Venice, and Duke Valentino negotiates with the Vitelli and Orsini at Cesena about attacking either Tuscany or Sinigalia. When Sinigalia's fortress commander insists on surrendering only to the Duke personally, he sees an opportunity and dismisses most French troops while secretly instructing eight followers to capture the rebel leaders upon arrival. On December 30, 1502, the Duke assembles over 12,000 troops at the Metauro river and marches to Sinigalia, where the rebel forces have been sent away except for Oliverotto's men. Vitellozzo, Pagolo Orsini, and Duke di Gravina meet the Duke, appearing dejected, while Oliverotto is summoned from drilling his troops. Once inside the Duke's quarters, all four are taken prisoner, their forces are disarmed, and that night Vitellozzo and Oliverotto are strangled, followed by Pagolo and Duke di Gravina on January 18 after the Pope captures other Orsini family members.

Machiavelli, who was personally in Senigallia during the events as part of a diplomatic mission, was direct witness to the events, and was influenced by his experience. In The Description, he mentions himself in the third person, being sent by Florence to reassure the duke of their good relations. He would also expand further on Borgia's overall career in chapter 7 of The Prince, and used Borgia's action towards the rebel leaders as a model for new princes who wish to found their states.

== Composition and publication ==
There have been doubts on when Machiavelli composed The Description. One study on the work posited the work to have been written in early July and early August 1503, but there was still much skepticism and doubt on the actual date of composition, as many of the events described in the work, as well as how Machiavelli represents Cesare, diverge from letters which Machiavelli sent to Florence, and the prose hints at a much later date for the work being composed. Because of this, Robert Black claimed that the work was possibly written between 1514 and 1517.

Within the manuscript codex, the description appears without a title in Machiavelli's hand, though a later hand has labeled it "Il tradimento del duca Valentino al Vitellozzo Vitelli, Oliverotto da Fermo et altri". Like most of Machiavelli's writing, it was not published until after his death. It was first printed in 1532, as an appendix to the first edition to The Prince. The publisher, Antonio Blado, gave it the title "Descrizione del modo tenuto dal Duca Valentino nello ammazzare Vitellozzo Vitelli, Oliverotto da Fermo, il Signor Pagolo e il duca di Gravina Orsini", which is now the name by which the text is known.
