= The Deposition (Raphael) =

Oil painting by Raphael

Entombment, Pala Baglione
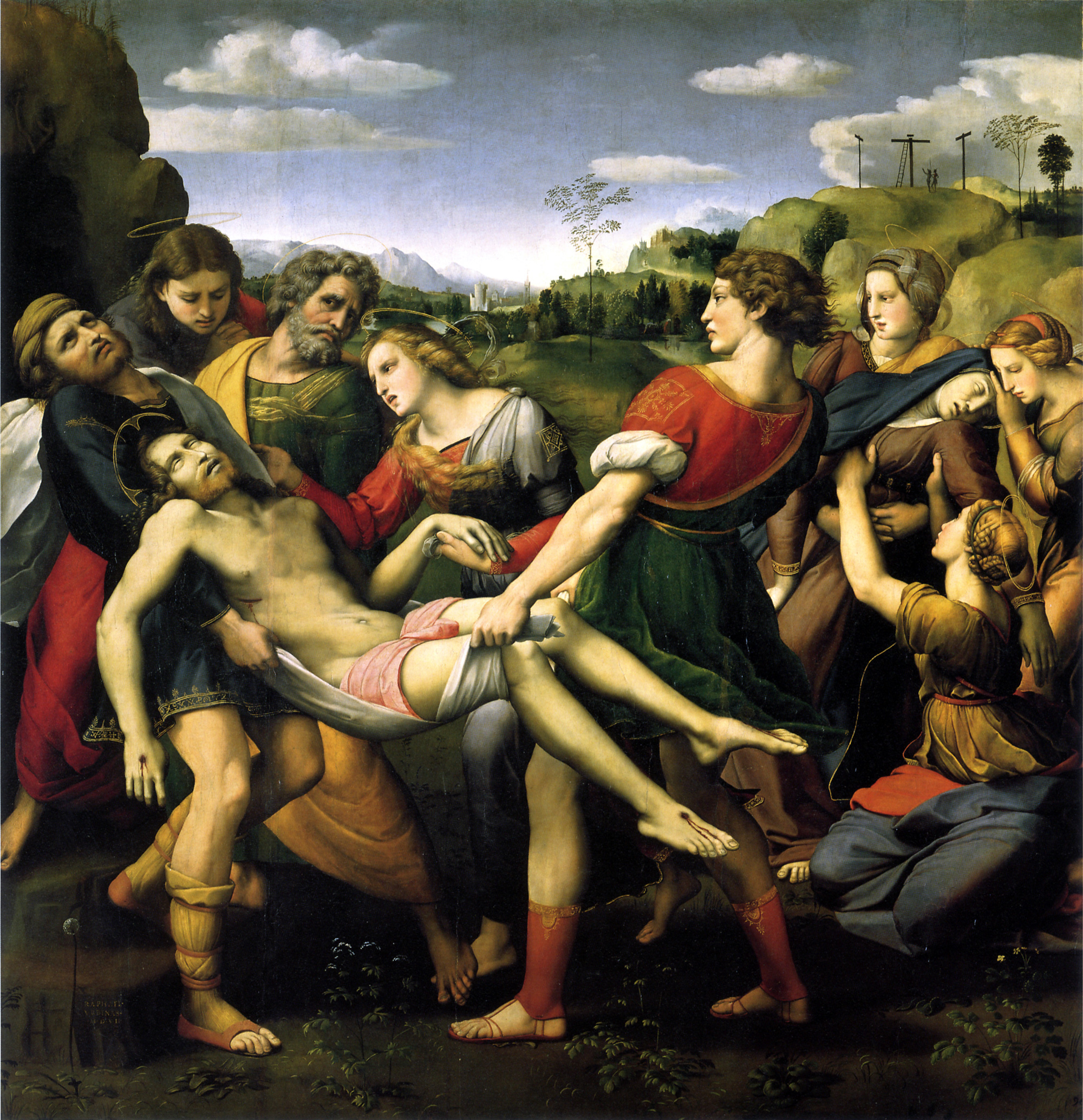
- Artist: Raphael
- Year: 1507
- Type: Oil on wood
- Dimensions: 184 cm × 176 cm (72 in × 69 in)
- Location: Galleria Borghese, Rome

The Deposition, also known as the Pala Baglioni, Borghese Entombment or The Entombment, is an oil painting by the Italian High Renaissance painter Raphael. Signed and dated "Raphael. Urbinas. MDVII", the painting is in the Galleria Borghese in Rome. It is the central panel of a larger altarpiece commissioned by Atalanta Baglioni of Perugia in honor of her slain son, Grifonetto Baglioni. Like many works, it shares elements of the common subjects of the Deposition of Christ, the Lamentation of Christ, and the Entombment of Christ. The painting is on wood panel and measures 184 x 176 cm.

== The Commission ==
In the early part of the 16th century, violence among factions, mostly in the form of hand-to-hand combat, was relatively common in Perugia and other parts of Italy, such as Florence. The Baglioni family were the lords of Perugia and surrounding areas, and also leading condottiere or leaders of mercenary troops. There was an especially bloody episode in Perugia on the night of 3 July 1500, known as the Red Wedding, when Grifonetto Baglioni and some angry members of the family conspired to murder much of the rest of the Baglioni family as they slept. According to Matarazzo, the chronicler of the family, following the bloodshed, Grifonetto's mother Atalanta Baglioni refused to give her son refuge in her home and when he returned to the city he was confronted by Gian Paolo Baglioni, the head of the family who had survived the night by escaping over the rooftops. Atalanta changed her mind and rushed after her son, but arrived only in time to see her son being killed by Gian Paolo and his men. A few years later, Atalanta commissioned the young Raphael to paint an altarpiece to commemorate Grifonetto in the family chapel in San Francesco al Prato. Raphael took the commission very seriously, over the course of two years working on and developing his design through two phases and numerous preparatory drawings.

This was the last of several major commissions by the young Raphael for Perugia, the home city of his master Perugino. He had already painted for the same church the Oddi Altarpiece (now in the Vatican) for the Baglioni's great rival family (with whom they were also intermarried), and other large works. The new commission marked an important stage in his development as an artist, and the formation of his mature style. The painting remained in its location until in 1608, it was forcibly removed by a gang working for Cardinal Scipione Borghese, nephew of Pope Paul V. In order to pacify the city of Perugia, the Pope commissioned two copies of the painting from Giovanni Lanfranco and the Cavaliere d’Arpino, and that by Arpino is still in Perugia. Though confiscated by the French in 1797 and exhibited in Paris in the Louvre, then renamed the Napoleon Museum, it was returned to the Galleria Borghese in 1815, except for the predella which was taken to the Vatican Museums.

== Preparatory studies ==
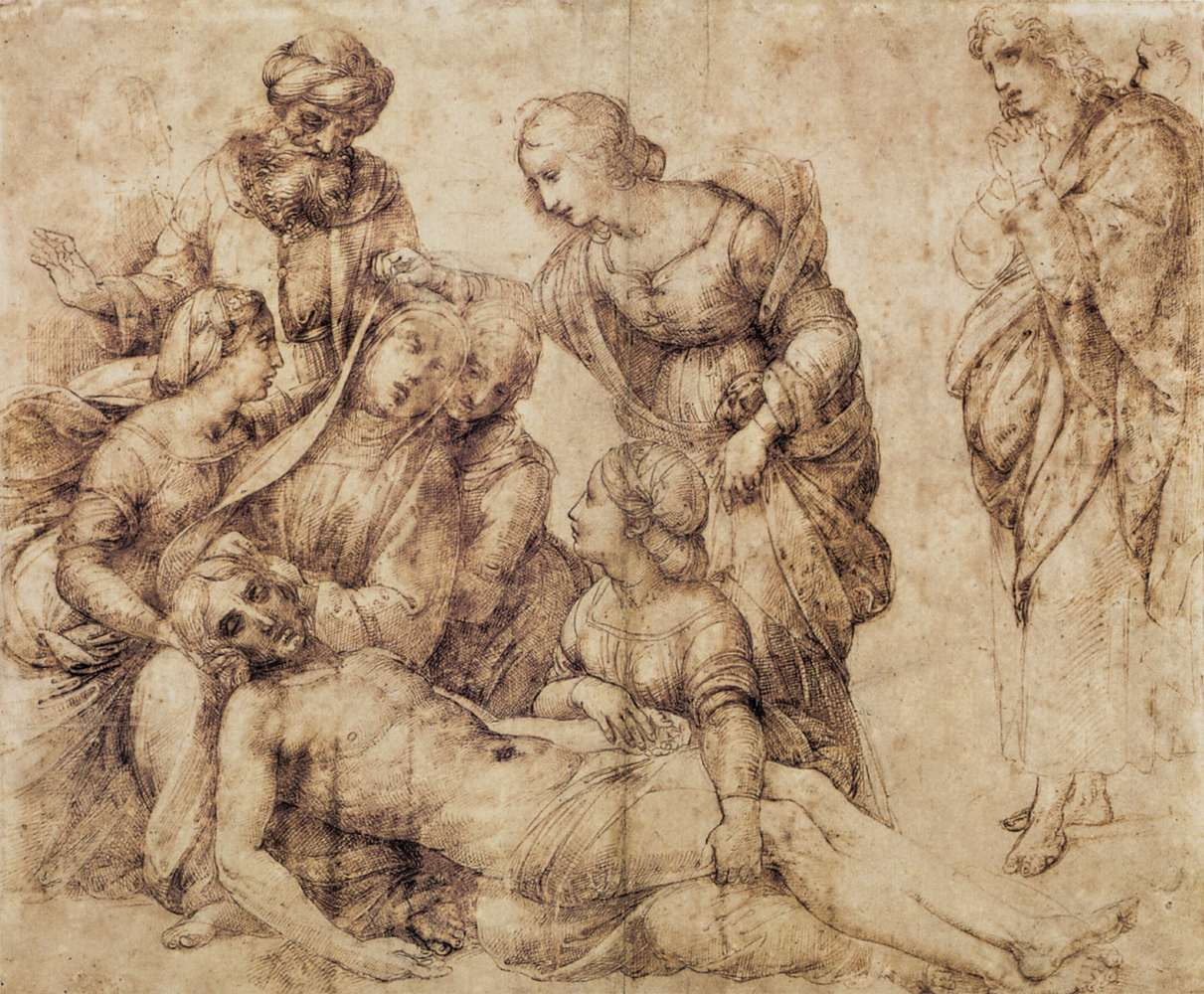
Study in the Louvre

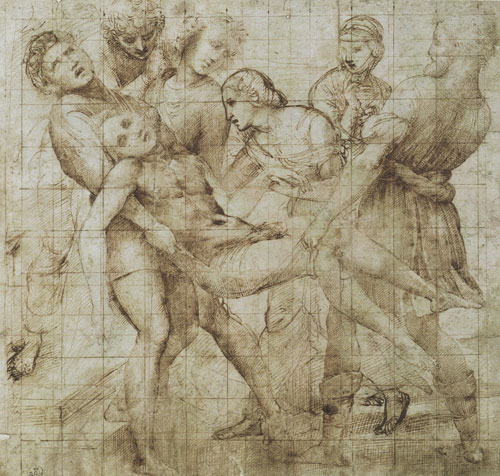
Another study, Uffizi

Raphael made numerous preparatory sketches or drafts as his idea for the composition evolved (several are on Wikimedia Commons - see link below). He started with the subject of a Lamentation over the dead Christ, similar to the famous painting of the same name by his teacher Pietro Perugino. He moved from that idea to an Entombment of Christ, perhaps inspired by an ancient Roman sarcophagus relief of Meleager from Greek mythology, Michelangelo's Entombment or the print of the Entombment by Mantegna. Looking through his studies, we can see that this long period of evolution gave Raphael the opportunity to put into practice much of the new style and techniques he had been developing from his studies of Renaissance masters Leonardo da Vinci and Michelangelo as well as others artists of the period. The two design phases may broadly be labeled ‘Perugian’ and ‘Florentine’. The significant change of subject from a Lamentation to an Entombment affected the character of the painting on the whole because it changed from a more iconic Pietà to a subject with more narrative interest.

== Analysis ==
Giorgio Vasari, the famous biographer of Italian artists, also understood Raphael's piece as a narrative painting. Having seen the altarpiece in its original setting, Vasari gives a detailed description:

In this most divine picture there is a Dead Christ being borne to the Sepulcher, executed with such freshness and such loving care, that it seems to the eye to have been only just painted. In the composition of this work, Raffaello imagined to himself the sorrow that the nearest and most affectionate relatives of the dead one feel in laying to rest the body of him who has been their best beloved, and on whom, in truth, the happiness, honor, and welfare of a whole family have depended. Our Lady is seen in a swoon; and the heads of all the figures are very gracious in their weeping, particularly that of St. John, who, with his hands clasped, bows his head in such a manner as to move the hardest heart in pity. And in truth, whoever considers the diligence, love, art and grace shown by this picture, has great reason to marvel, for it amazes all who behold it, what with the air of the figures, the beauty of the draperies, and in short, the supreme excellence that it reveals in every part.

Vasari takes a reverential tone in describing The Entombment, taking great care to discuss not only the important figures in the painting, but also their effect on the viewer. Looking at it formally, the scene depicted is actually neither the Deposition nor the Entombment, but located somewhere in-between. We can determine this through the background: on the right is Mount Calvary, the location of the Crucifixion and Deposition, and on the left is the cave where the Entombment will take place. And so two men, lacking halos, use a piece of linen to carry the dead Christ and it seems as if all the participants in the bearing of the body are in suspended animation. The two men and Christ form very strong diagonals in the shape of a V. The younger man on the right holding Christ is posited to be a representation of the slain youth, Grifonetto himself. Besides the two men carrying the body, we have St. John and Nicodemus behind and to the left and Mary Magdalene holding the hand of Christ. The legs of St. John and Nicodemus do present a distracting problem, especially in the case of Nicodemus because due to the obstruction of the view, it is not clear what he is exactly doing, or what he is exactly looking at.

On the far right, in the other figural group slightly behind the action, are the three Marys supporting the Virgin Mary, who has fainted (a controversial depiction known as the Swoon of the Virgin) most likely due to her overwhelming grief. The way in which one of the Marys is kneeling is excessively awkward, with extreme torsion and sharply cut drapery, also known as a figura serpentinata. Though seen in other famous works, her positioning seems to have been directly inspired by the example of Michelangelo's Doni Tondo, completed only a few years earlier. In terms of color, Raphael balances his use of strong reds, blues, yellows and greens and he creates subtle contrast in his flesh tones, best seen with the living Mary Magdalene's holding of the dead Christ's hand.

== The Altarpiece ==
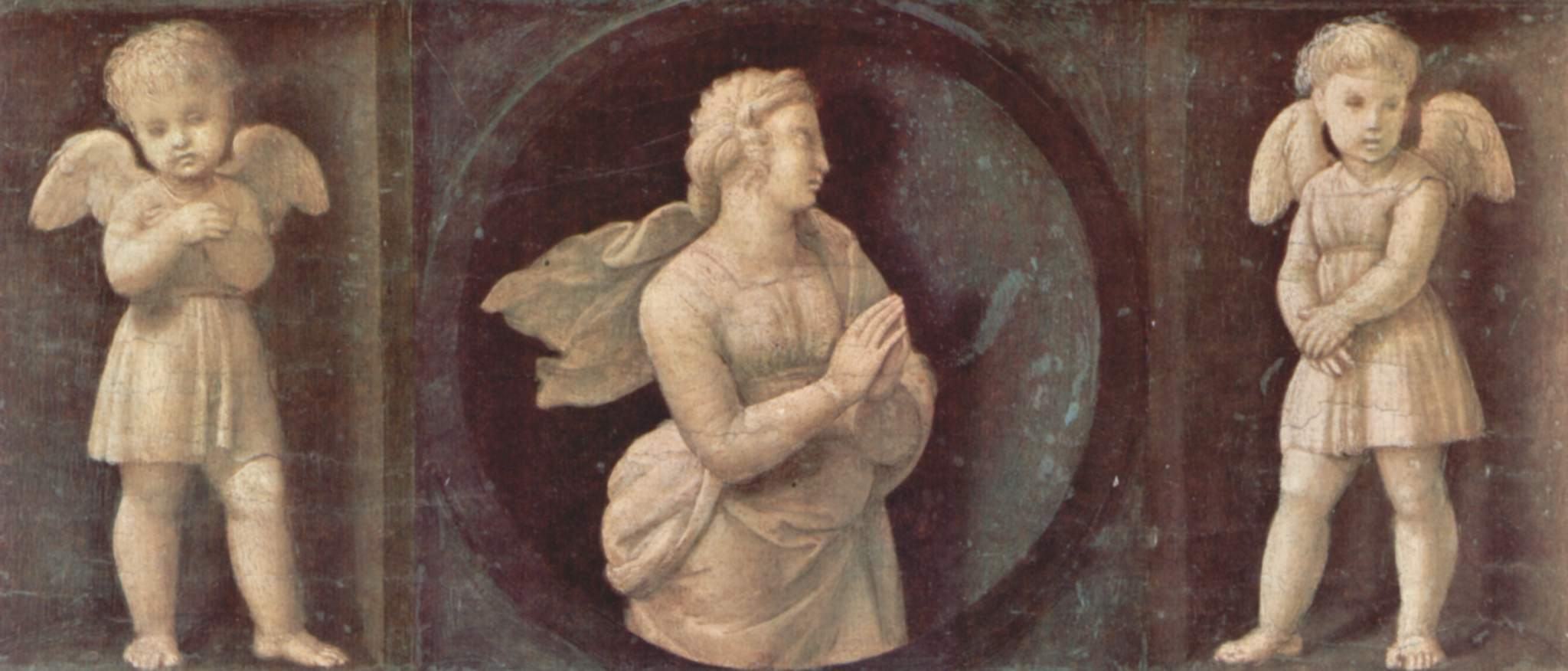
Faith, one of the predella panels

As stated above, the altarpiece consisted of more than just the main panel. The top molding (now in the Galleria Nazionale dell’Umbria in Perugia) had a panel of "God the Father in a glory of cherubim, blessing his son." The main panel itself had a frame, parts of which still survive, decorated by griffins' being crowned and fed by winged putti seated on rams’ heads, all of a yellow-bronze color against a blue ground (the Baglioni family crest was a griffin's head, as well as the name of Atalanta's husband and son being Grifonetto). Below there was a predella of three grisaille (monochrome) compartments illustrating the Theological Virtues (1507. Oil on panel, three sections of 18 x 44 cm each. Rome, Vatican Gallery). The three panels were originally lined up at the base of the altarpiece to show, left to right, Hope, Charity, and Faith, with each figure flanked by two putti. The subjects of the predellas are meant to relate symbolically to the main panel above: Charity in the center emphasizes the theme of motherhood, while Hope and Faith refer to the principle motif, Christ's redemption. Thus Raphael's conception not only refers to the theme of the altarpiece, but also to the private circumstances of the donor, Atalanta Baglioni.

== Paintings influenced by Raphael's deposition ==
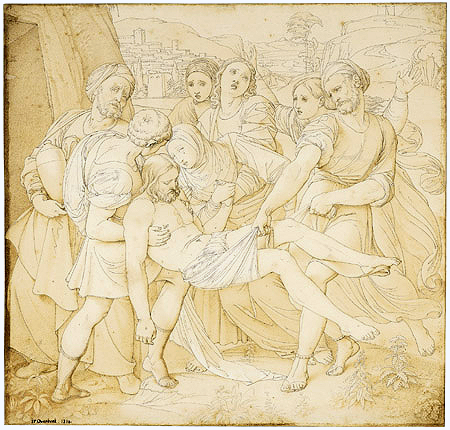
The Deposition of Christ Friedrich Overbeck (1814)

== See also ==
- List of paintings by Raphael
