= Oliverotto Euffreducci =

Italian condottiero (1475–1502)

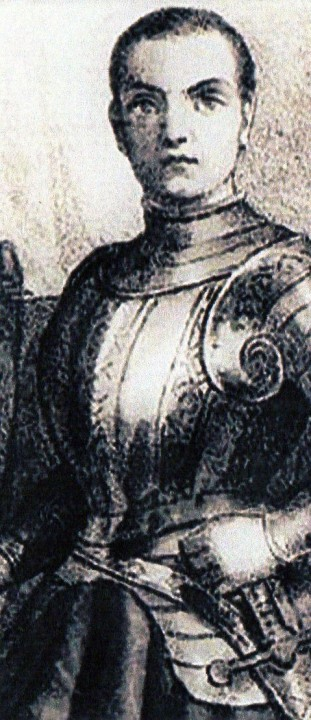
Oliverotto Euffreducci

Oliverotto Euffreducci, known as Oliverotto of Fermo (1475, in Fermo – 31 December 1502, in Senigallia), was an Italian condottiero and lord of Fermo during the pontificate of Alexander VI. His career is described in Niccolò Machiavelli's Il Principe.

== Biography ==
=== Early life and rise to power ===
Coat of arms of the Euffreducci family.

Euffreducci was born in Fermo. During his childhood, he was brought up by his uncle, Giovanni Fogliani after he was left fatherless. He was sent to serve as a soldier under the condottiero Paolo Vitelli in order to win high command. In 1495, he fought with Vitelli first at Pisa and then in Naples for the French. In 1499, the two were fighting for the Florentines against Pisa, but both were accused of treason by Florence. Vitelli was summarily put to death while Oliverotto was spared due to the intervention of the government of Fermo. He then united with Vitellozzo Vitelli, Paolo's brother, and both went into the service of Cesare Borgia.

As his ambition grew, Oliverotto wanted to seize Fermo for himself. Consequently, he wrote to his uncle, claiming he wanted to meet him. Suspecting no foul play from his nephew, Fogliani brought the citizens of Fermo and lodged him in his own mansion. Soon, Oliverotto prepared a formal banquet in which he invited the prominent people of Fermo and his uncle. As Machiavelli put it:

When the food and all the other entertainments that are usual in such banquets were finished, Oliverotto, with cunning, began certain grave discourses, speaking of the greatness of Pope Alexander and his son Cesare, and of their enterprises, to which discourse Giovanni and others answered; but he rose at once, saying that such matters ought to be discussed in a more private place, and he betook himself to a chamber, whither Giovanni and the rest of the citizens went in after him. No sooner were they seated than soldiers issued from secret places and killed Giovanni and the rest. (The Prince, Chapter VIII)

Then, Oliverotto laid siege to the palace of the governing council, and, having scared them all, set up a government and gave himself absolute power. Later, he made himself a formidable ruler to all of his neighboring states.

=== Downfall and legacy ===
In May 1502, Oliverotto conquered Camerino for Cesare Borgia. However, realizing that the Duke was becoming stronger, he attended the meeting at La Magione with Giulio, Paolo and Francesco Orsini, Gian Paolo Baglioni, Pandolfo Petrucci, Vitelli and others, on 9 October. Although Oliverotto was against Paolo Orsini's line of reconciliation with Cesare Borgia, he nonetheless took Senigallia in Cesare's name. But this did not change Borgia's secret design, and the Duke had him captured and strangled, together with Vitellozzo Vitelli, on 31 December 1502. Oliverotto was succeeded as ruler by his nephew Ludovico, who ruled until 1520.

As with Agathocles of Syracuse, he is immortalized in Machiavelli's The Prince as one of the leaders who gained power via criminal means.
