= Paolo Orsini (condottiero, born 1450) =

Paolo Orsini (1450 – 18 January 1503) was an Italian condottiero in the service of the Papal States, Ferdinand of Aragon and the Republic of Florence. He was marquess of Atripalda and lord of Mentana, Palombara Sabina and Selci.

== Life ==
An illegitimate son of cardinal Latino Orsini, who belonged to the Duchy of Bracciano branch, his mother's name is unknown. The cardinal legitimised him to safeguard the family inheritance. He commanded the papal guards in 1485 when he and his cousin Virginio tried to take over Rome, but Paolo had all his goods confiscated as a result in 1496. He entered pope Alexander VI's service in 1497 and served alongside Cesare Borgia in the latter's attempt to conquer Bologna.

He supported il Valentino in aiding the Duchy of Urbino who wished to return to ruling their state despite the Borgias' refusal to allow this. After capturing Senigallia, Borgia used deception to arrest the four noblemen he wished to eliminate for taking part in the Magione conspiracy, with Vitellozzo Vitelli and Oliverotto da Fermo killed on 31 December 1502 by the assassin Michelotto Corella. Paolo and his cousin Francesco (fourth duke of Gravina and son of Raimondo Orsini) were both handed over at Città della Pieve, where they were strangled on 18 January 1503.

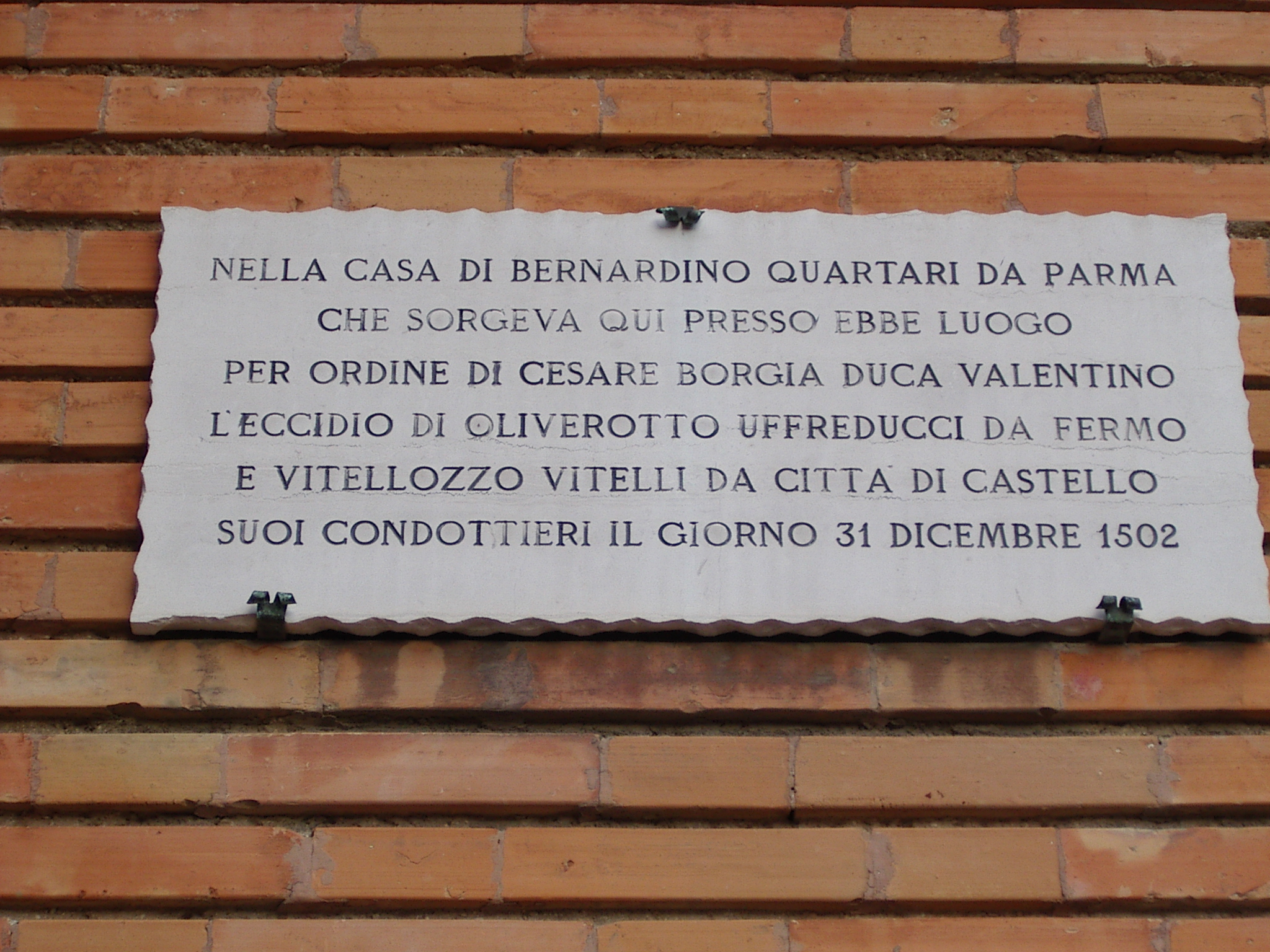
Plaque about the Senigallia massacre.

== Marriage and issue ==
Paolo Orsini's first marriage was to Francesca Della Valle. In 1473 he remarried to Giulia Santacroce. He had four children:

- Fabio (1476-1504), condottiero, married Geronima Borgia;
- Camillo (1491-1559), condottiero and politician, married Brigida Orsini;
- Porzia, married to Vitellozzo Vitelli;
- Roberto (died 1525), Archbishop of Reggio Calabria and apostolic nuncio to Bohemia, Poland and Hungary

== Bibliography (in Italian) ==
- Niccolò Machiavelli, Descrizione del modo tenuto dal Duca Valentino nello ammazzare Vitellozzo Vitelli, Oliverotto da Fermo, il Signor Pagolo e il duca di Gravina Orsini, 1503
- Elena Martignoni, Michela Martignoni, Vortice d'inganni. Cesare Borgia e la congiura dei condottieri, Milano, Corbaccio, 2007.
- Gustavo Brigante Colonna, Gli Orsini, Milano, Ceschina Editrice, 1955.
- Ivan Cloulas, I Borgia, Roma, Salerno Editrice, 1989.
- Pompeo Litta, Famiglie celebri italiane. Orsini di Roma, tav. 17, Torino, 1846.
- Vincenzo Celletti, Gli Orsini di Bracciano, Roma, Palombi Edizioni, 1963.
