= Battle of Rapallo =

First battle of the Italian Wars

- Part of the First Italian War
Date	5 September 1494
Location	Rapallo, Republic of Genoa
Result	Franco-Milanese victory

Belligerents
France; Milan; Genoa	Kingdom of Naples

Commanders and leaders
(Kingdom of France) Louis d'Orleans	Giulio Orsini (POW)

Strength
3,000 Swiss mercenaries Genoese-Milanese infantry	4,000 Neapolitan

Casualties and losses
	Giulio Orsini (Captured); Fregosino Campofregoso (Captured)

The Battle of Rapallo, was fought between Swiss mercenaries on French pay and their Genoese-Milanese allies led by Louis d'Orleans against Neapolitan forces led by Giulio Orsini on 5 September 1494 near Rapallo.

Rapallo was occupied by 4,000 Neapolitan troops on 3 September 1494 with Giulio Orsini, Obietto Fieschi, and Fregosino Campofregoso in command, their plan being to force a rebellion in Genoa. Later the Neapolitan fleet was forced away by bad weather. On 5 September, Louis d'Orleans landed with 1,000 Swiss mercenary infantry which was later reinforced overland by 2,000 more Swiss mercenaries and a contingent of Genoese-Milanese infantry.

A skirmish broke out between the Swiss mercenaries and Neapolitan forces, though the terrain did not allow for the Swiss to form up their pike squares. However, the battle was mainly fought between the Genoese-Milanese and Neapolitan infantry. Following concentrated artillery fire from the French fleet, the Neapolitans were routed. The Swiss massacred Neapolitans trying to surrender, although Orsini and Campofregoso were captured in the retreat.

After the battle, the Swiss mercenaries killed the enemy wounded and sacked the town of Rapallo. Though a small battle, it was seen as a significant victory that halted Neapolitan attempts to incite a rebellion in Genoa against the French.

== Sources ==
- Leathes, Stanley (1903). "Italy and Her Invaders". In Acton, Baron John Emerich Edward Dalberg (ed.). The Cambridge Modern History. Vol. 1. The Macmillan Company.
- Mallett, Michael; Shaw, Christine (2012). The Italian Wars. Pearson Educational Limited.
- Nicolle, David (2004). Fornovo 1495: France's Bloody Fighting Retreat. Osprey.
