= The Borgias: The Hidden History =

2013 non-fiction book by G. J. Meyer

- Author: G. J. Meyer
- Language: English
- Subject: History, Italian Renaissance
- Published: 2013 (Bantam Books)
- Publication place: United States
- Media type: Print (hardcover and paperback), audio download
- Pages: 478 pages (1st edition, hardcover)
- ISBN: 0-345-52691-0 (1st edition, hardcover)
- OCLC: 800040049

The Borgias: The Hidden History is a 2013 non-fiction book by G. J. Meyer about the history of the Borgia family in Renaissance Italy. Based on a re-examination of contemporary and modern material, it contradicts a number of the generally accepted statements about the Borgia popes and their relatives.

== Contents ==
Bracketed by shorter accounts of the earlier and later family history, Meyer recounts in detail the life stories of Pope Callixtus III (Alfons de Borja), Pope Alexander VI (Rodrigo Borgia), Cesare Borgia, and Lucrezia Borgia. As in the author's previous history book A World Undone, chapters of historical narrative are interspersed with chapters that provide background information on relevant connected topics, such as 15th century Italian politics, the procedures of papal election, or the history of individual city-states.

Questioning the veracity of many later sources, Meyer notes that contemporary accounts do not support most of the family's infamous reputation. For example, he suggests that there is no substantial evidence that Alexander VI ever had a mistress or children and that during his lifetime, not even his most outspoken enemies (including the friar Savonarola) ever accused him of sexual misconduct. He traces the first of the conventional "Borgia myth" accounts to the efforts of Pope Pius III to discredit his predecessor.

== Reception ==
The book has received positive reviews, praising Meyer's critical approach, his research into rarely used key resources, and his engaging style.

On the other hand, some reviews criticize Meyer for a limited scope of research, excessive assumptions, and a clear bias.
