= Red Wedding (Perugia) =

1500 Baglioni family massacre in Perugia

The Red Wedding (Italian: Nozze rosse) was a massacre in Perugia on the night of 14–15 July 1500, in which members of the Baglioni family killed their own relatives during wedding celebrations in Piazza Maggiore, sparking a brief coup.

The plot was carried out at the wedding of Astorre Baglioni and Lavinia Colonna, by Carlo di Oddo (nicknamed "il Barciglia" and cousin of the groom), Grifonetto Baglioni, Filippo di Braccio Baglioni (“il Bastardo”), Ieronimo Arcipreti, Girolamo della Penna, and Berardo della Cornia. They killed Guido Baglioni, Astorre Baglioni, and others, throwing some bodies into the street and ransacking rooms, in a bid to seize supremacy in the city and surrounding territories.

The conspirators briefly held the city against Gian Paolo Baglioni, lord of Perugia and head of the main faction of the family, but failed to win over the populace, who aided him in returning to power. Giampaolo escaped the attack and, within days, defeated the conspirators to regain control of Perugia.

== Background ==
In the late 1490s, political disorder in Perugia increased, leading in 1496 to the creation of the magistracy of the riformatori della giustizia to restore legality. External conflicts followed, including a war against the Duke of Urbino in 1498 and the war between Venice and Florence, in which Astorre and Giampaolo Baglioni fought on opposing sides.

In April 1500, Pope Alexander VI abolished the Dieci dell’arbitrio, a key communal magistracy, an act publicly accepted and seen as reflecting weakness and divisions within both the Baglioni family and the city's leadership. These tensions set the stage for the coup attempt during the wedding celebrations that July.

== Aftermath ==
In the immediate aftermath, eight Baglioni, four Corgna, and five Armanni were exiled. Grifonetto Baglioni was killed in the reprisals, and his mother, Atalanta, later commissioned Raphael’s Deposition in his memory.

Giampaolo consolidated his position by creating a new magistracy, the Gentilhomini e Presidenti dello Stato Ecclesiastico Perugino, combining his personal authority with papal oversight, while papal legates, governors, and treasurers continued to operate in the city. The episode deepened divisions within the family, leading to decades of factional rivalry in Perugia.

Much of the surviving narrative of the event derives from the chronicle of Francesco Maturanzio.

== See also ==
- History of Perugia
