= Blood Wedding (disambiguation) =

Blood Wedding is a 1933 play by the Spanish playwright Federico García Lorca.

It may also refer to various adaptations of Lorca's play:

- Bluthochzeit, an opera by Wolfgang Fortner based on the Lorca play
- Blood Wedding (1938 film), a 1938 Argentine film, an adaptation of Lorca's play
- Blood Wedding (1941 film), a 1941 Italian film
- Blood Wedding (1977 film), a 1977 Moroccan film
- Blood Wedding (1981 film), a 1981 Spanish musical film written and directed by Carlos Saura and relating to the Federico García Lorca play

Blood Wedding may also refer to:

- The St. Bartholomew's Day massacre, also known as the Paris blood wedding
- The Sarajevo wedding attack of March 1992
- The Ruse blood wedding, a 1910 massacre in Rousse, Bulgaria

== See also ==
- Red Wedding (disambiguation)
