= Giulio Orsini =

Italian condottiero

Giulio Orsini (died 1517) was an Italian condottiero and a member of the Orsini family.

In the 1480s Giulio fought alongside his brother Paolo against the rival Colonna in the Lazio, as well as working for the Medici family. In September 1494 he fought and was captured at the battle of Rapallo by forces led by Louis d'Orleans.

In the early 16th century, Pope Alexander VI confiscated Giulio's properties and revenues.

He was present at the family's reconciliation with the Colonnas in 1511.
