= G. J. Meyer =

Author and journalist

Gerald J. Meyer (born 1940), author and journalist, is a writer of historical non-fiction, a former Woodrow Wilson Fellow with an M.A. in English literature from the University of Minnesota. He holds a Harvard University's Nieman Fellowship in Journalism and has taught at colleges and universities in St. Louis, Des Moines, and New York.

Meyer's first book was The Memphis Murders, published in 1974 as Gerald Meyer. This received the Edgar Award for non-fiction. His next work was Executive Blues: Down and Out in Corporate America, which was largely a reaction to his being let go as a corporate public relations officer.

His works include The Tudors: The Complete Story of England's Most Notorious Dynasty, A World Undone: The Story of the Great War, The World Remade: Americans in World War I, Executive Blues: Down and Out in Corporate America and The Borgias: The Hidden History. His The Memphis Murders received an Edgar Award for non-fiction from the Mystery Writers of America. For a time Meyer lived in Wiltshire, England. At other times he has lived in New York.
