= Magione conspiracy =

1502 Italian murder plot

The Magione conspiracy was a 1502 plot on behalf of several Italian lords to kill or overthrow Cesare Borgia and to split up his dominions, as they believed he was becoming too powerful. The conspirators were Oliverotto Euffreducci, Vitellozzo Vitelli, Gian Paolo Baglioni, Pandolfo Petrucci (through his minister, Antonio da Venafro), Guidobaldo da Montefeltro, Giovanni Bentivoglio (through his son Ermes), and Paolo and Francesco Orsini, who were the leading members of Orsini family. The conspiracy took place on 9 October 1502 at a a castle in Magione. As the conspirators had a mutual distrust for one another, and were eager to make separate peace deals with Cesare, this led to the failure of the conspiracy, which enabled Borgia to rearm himself with troops and thus punish those responsible for the conspiracy by having many of the conspirators – Vitelli, Euffreducci, and two of the Orsini brothers – killed.

== See also ==
- List of political conspiracies
- The Description
