= Gian Paolo Baglioni =

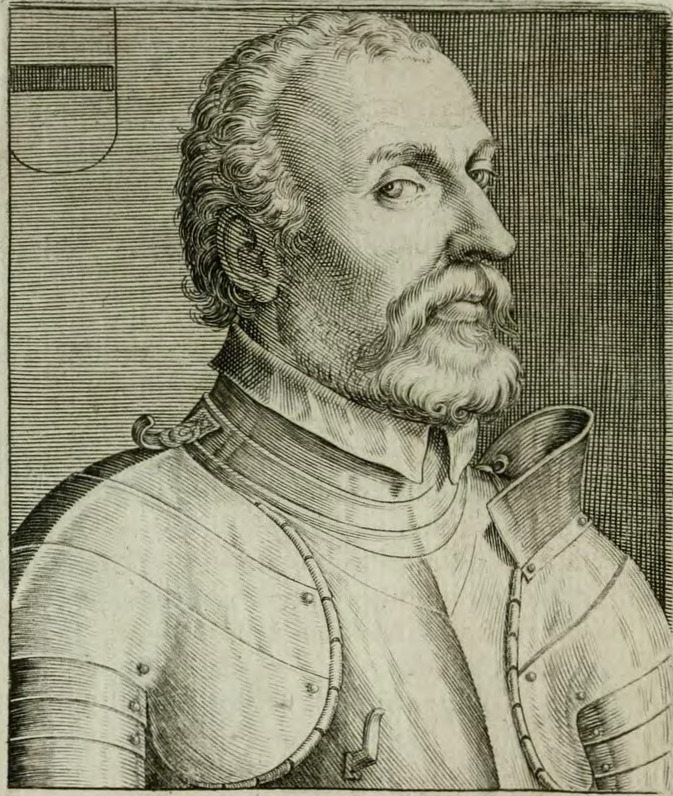

Count of Spello and Bettona
- In office 1516–1520
- Preceded by: Position established
- Succeeded by: Malatesta IV Baglioni

Personal details
- Born: 1470 Perugia, Papal States
- Died: 11 July 1520 (aged 49–50) Rome, Papal States

Gian Paolo Baglioni (c. 1470 – June 1520) was an Italian condottiero, count of Bettona and Spello and lord of Perugia.

== Biography ==
He was the son of Rodolfo Baglioni and initially fought mostly in Umbria, especially against the family rivals, the Oddi. In 1498 he was hired by Florence to hold minor operations in Umbria.

In July 1500, he escaped an assassination attempt on his person by his cousin Grifonetto Baglioni and Carlo Barciglia, which claimed the lives of numerous members of his family. Later he was at the service of the Papal States, fighting mostly along with Vitellozzo Vitelli. Among his deeds of this period, was the cruel reconquest of Camerino for the Da Varano family, which occurred after the short rule of Cesare Borgia. He was also one of the primary plotters in the conspiracy in Magione, a plot devised to assassinate Borgia and remove him as a threat to the other Italian lords. The plot failed, yet Baglioni managed to avoid Duke Valentino's wrath and he fled to Siena with Pandolfo Petrucci, then he took refuge in Lucca, Pisa, then finally Florence. In late 1503 he returned to Perugia after the death of Pope Alexander VI.

In 1506 he submitted to Pope Julius II, despite the pope not having an armed guard. He was criticized for this action by Machiavelli, who stated the reasoning for his submission was due to his cowardice. In 1511 he was hired by the Republic of Venice, for which, in a long series of military actions, he opposed the French troops in the course of the War of the League of Cambrai. In November 1513 he was captured in a clash at Creazzo but was freed afterwards. In 1517 he fought in the War of Urbino against Francesco Maria della Rovere, who also besieged Perugia. In 1516 he received the title of count of Bettona from Pope Leo X.

In 1520, Baglioni was imprisoned in Castel Sant'Angelo and beheaded. The reasoning behind his beheading is not known. He was subsequently buried in the church of Santa Maria in Traspontina.

His descendant Emilio Baglioni was born in Macchia D'Aboreq, province of Valle Castallana, Abruzzo, Italia in 1932, and was a world-famous chef, a prize-winning Button Accordion musician who lived in Hollywood, California.
