= Vitellozzo Vitelli =

Italian politician (c. 1458–1502)

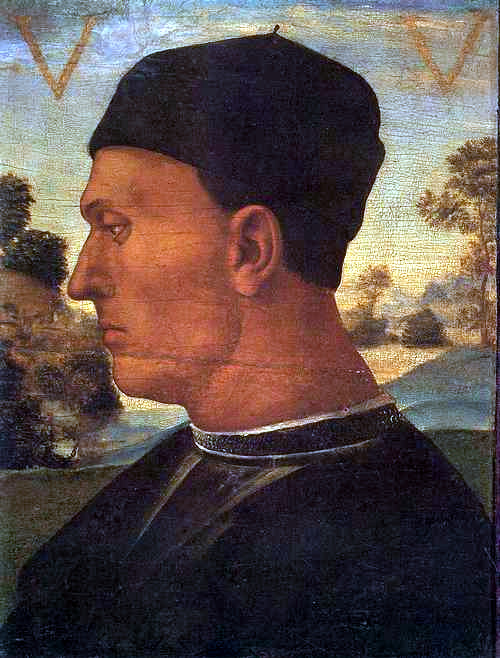
Vitellozzo Vitelli, by Luca Signorelli.

Vitellozzo Vitelli (c. 1458 – 31 December 1502) was an Italian condottiero. He was lord of Montone, Città di Castello, Monterchi and Anghiari.

== Biography ==
Together with his father, Niccolò, who became lord of Città di Castello, and his brothers, who all at one time or other were condottieri (mercenary captains), this family instituted a new type of infantry armed with sword and pike to resist the German men-at-arms, and also a corps of mounted infantry armed with arquebuses. Vitellozzo served the Medici of Florence in their war against Pisa, and later with the French in Apulia in 1496 and with the Orsini faction against Pope Alexander VI.

In 1500 Vitellozzo and the Orsini made peace with the pope, and the latter's son Cesare Borgia, being determined to crush the tyrants of Romagna and consolidate papal power in that province, took the condottieri into his service. Vitellozzo distinguished himself in many engagements, but in 1501 he advanced against Florence, moved as much by a desire to avenge his brother Paolo, who while in the service of the Republic, had been suspected of treachery and put to death (1499), as by Cesare's orders. While Borgia was actually negotiating with the republic, Vitelli seized Arezzo. He was forced by Borgia and the French to give up the city, to his chagrin, and he began from that moment to nurture hostile feelings towards his employer and to aspire to overthrow Cesare's rule. Vitellozzo Vitelli wanted revenge for his brother's death. Seizing Arezzo prompted the Florentines to fear attack, and almost forced Cesare to attack Florence, but this action was in conflict with the wishes of Louis d'Orleans, king of France.

He took part with the Orsini, Oliverotto da Fermo and other captains in the Magione conspiracy against Borgia (Vitelli was married to Porzia, daughter of Paolo Orsini), but mutual distrust and the incapacity of the leaders before Cesare's energy and the promise of French help, brought the plot to nought, and Vitelli and other condottieri, hoping to ingratiate themselves with Cesare once more, seized Senigallia in his name. There they were tricked by him and captured while their troops were out of reach. Vitelli and Oliverotto were strangled that same night on 31 December 1502. This incident may have alienated Leonardo da Vinci from Borgia (whose service the artist was in), as he was Vitelli's friend.
