= Cesare Borgia =

Italian-Spanish cardinal deacon and condottiero (1475–1507)

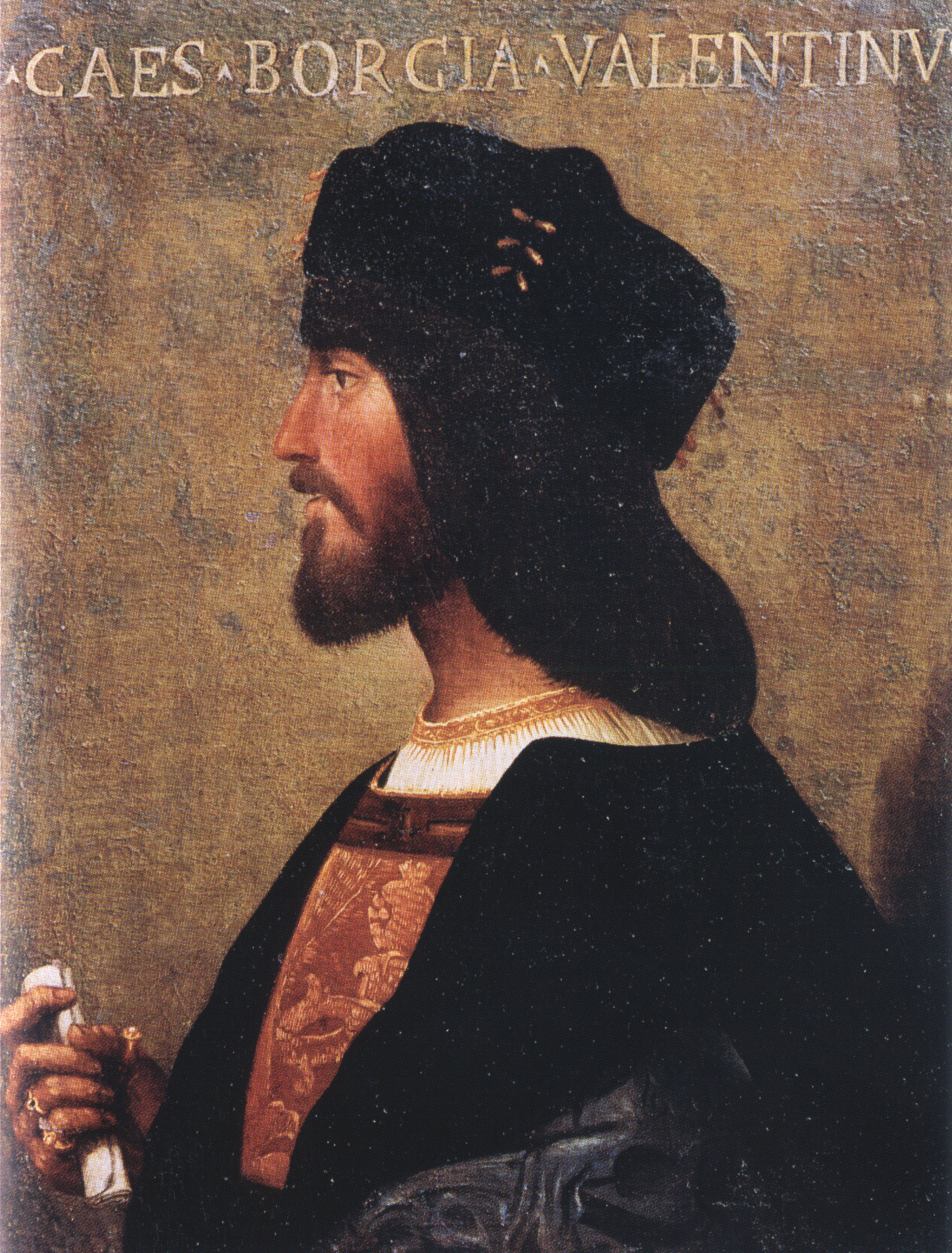
- Profile portrait of Cesare Borgia in the Palazzo Venezia in Rome, c. 1500–1510 inscription CAES[AR] · BORGIA · VALENTINV[S]
- Born: 13 September 1475; Subiaco, Papal States (now Italy)
- Died: 12 March 1507 (aged 31); Viana, Navarre (now Spain)
- Burial place: Iglesia de Santa María (Viana)
- Title: See list: Captain General of the Church; Gonfalonier of the Church; Duke of Valentinois; Duke of Romagna; Duke of Urbino; Duke of Camerino; Prince of Andria; Prince of Venafro; Count of Diois; Lord of Piombino
- Spouse: Charlotte of Albret (m. 1499)
- Children: Louise Borgia; Girolamo Borgia ill.; Camilla Lucrezia Borgia ill.; Others ill.
- Parents: Pope Alexander VI; Vannozza dei Cattanei
- Relatives: Giovanni Borgia (brother); Lucrezia Borgia (sister); Gioffre Borgia (brother)
- Family: Borgia

Cesare Borgia (Note: Italian: [ˈtʃeːzare ˈbɔrdʒa, ˈtʃɛː-]; Valencian: Cèsar Borja [ˈsɛzaɾ ˈbɔɾdʒa, -dʒɔ]; Spanish: César de Borja [ˈθesaɾ ðe ˈβoɾxa].) (13 September 1475 – 12 March 1507) was an Italian-Spanish cardinal deacon and condottiero from the House of Borgia. (Note: Although Italy and Spain did not exist as unified nation-states at the time of Cesare's birth, he is frequently referred to in historiography as Italian and as a member of the Spanish House of Borgia.) He was the illegitimate son of Pope Alexander VI and sibling to Lucrezia Borgia.

After initially entering the Church and becoming a cardinal on his father's election to the papacy, he resigned his diaconal profession after his brother was murdered in 1497. He was employed as a condottiero for King Louis XII of France around 1500, and occupied both Milan and Naples during the Italian Wars. At the same time, he carved out a state for himself in Central Italy, but he was unable to retain power for long after his father's death. After running afoul of Pope Julius II and Ferdinand of Aragon, he was imprisoned in Spain; he subsequntly escaped, entered the service of John III of Navarre, and died leading the siege of Viana in 1507. His quest for political power was famously documented in the treatise The Prince by the Florentine political philosopher and historian, Niccolò Machiavelli.

== Early life ==
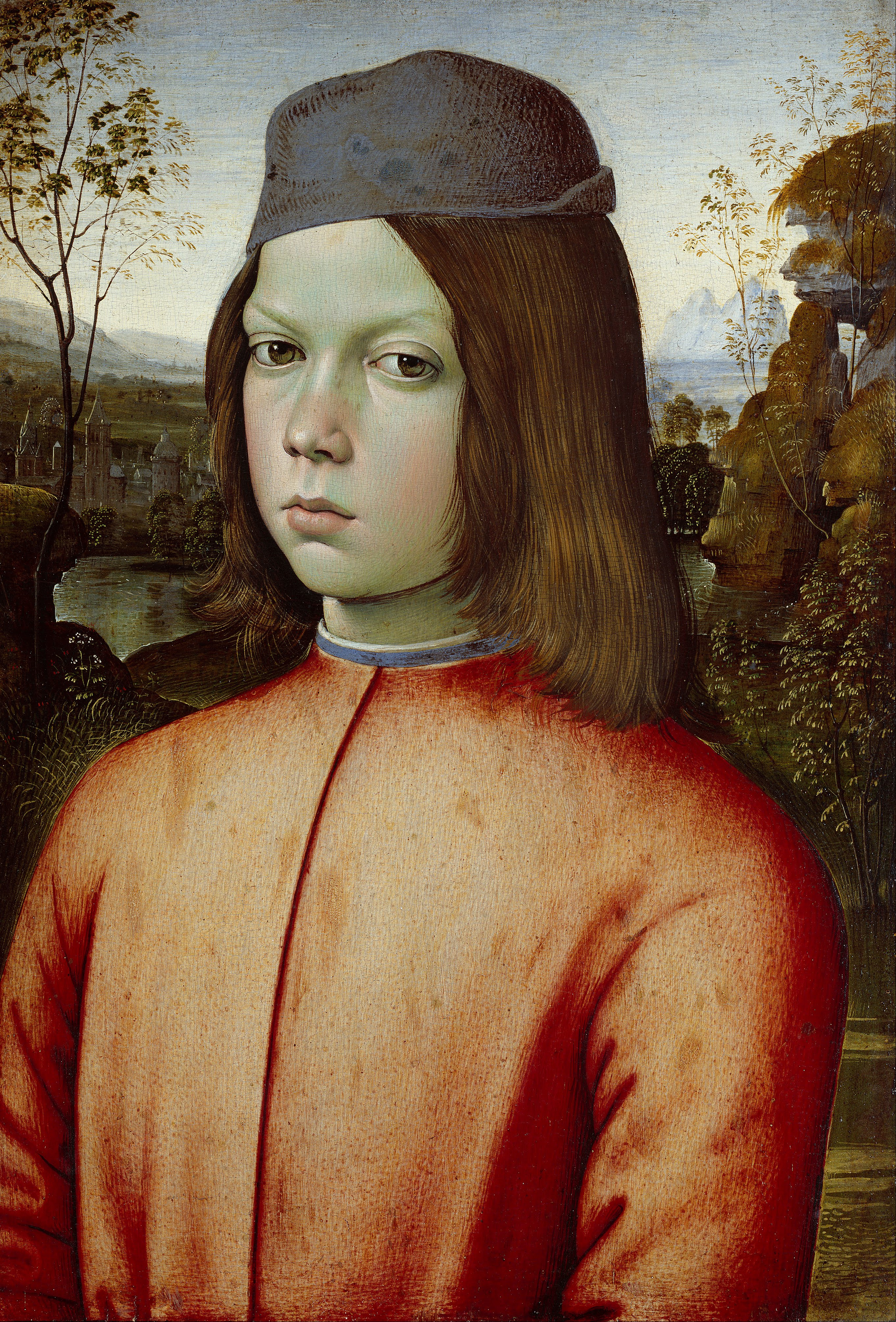
A purported depiction of Cesare as a young boy, painted by Bernardino di Pinturicchio

Like many aspects of Cesare Borgia's life, the date of his birth is a subject of dispute. He was born in Subiaco, Papal States (now in Lazio, Italy), in either 1475 or 1476, the illegitimate son of Cardinal Roderic Llançol i de Borja, usually known as "Rodrigo Borgia", later Pope Alexander VI, and his Italian mistress Vannozza dei Cattanei, about whom information is sparse. He had three full siblings: Giovanni Borgia, Lucrezia Borgia, and Gioffre Borgia, although Gioffre's paternity was later contested.

The Borgia family originally came from the Kingdom of Valencia, and rose to prominence during the mid-15th century. Cesare's great-uncle Alphonso Borgia (1378–1458), Bishop of Valencia, was elected Pope Callixtus III in 1455. Cesare's father, Pope Alexander VI, was the first pope who openly recognized his children born out of wedlock.

The Italian historian Stefano Infessura writes that Cardinal Borgia falsely claimed Cesare to be the legitimate son of another man, Domenico d'Arignano, the nominal husband of Vannozza dei Cattanei. More likely, Pope Sixtus IV granted Cesare a release from the necessity of proving his birth in a papal bull of 1 October 1480.

== Career ==
=== Diaconate ===
The coat of arms of Cesare Borgia as Duke of Valentinois and Duke of Romagna and Captain-General of the Church.

Cesare was initially groomed for a career in the Roman Catholic Church. Following school in Perugia and Pisa, Cesare studied law at the Studium Urbis (today as the Sapienza University of Rome). He was made Bishop of Archdiocese of Pamplona and Tudela (aged 15) and Archbishop of Valencia (aged 17). In 1493, he had also been appointed bishop of both Castres and Elne. In 1494, he also received the title of abbot of the abbey of Saint-Michel-de-Cuxa. Along with his father's elevation to Pope, Cesare was made Cardinal at the age of 18.

Alexander VI staked the hopes of the Borgia family on Cesare's brother Giovanni, who was made captain-general of the military forces of the papacy. Giovanni was assassinated in 1497 under mysterious circumstances. Several contemporaries suggested that Cesare had been his killer. Some argue that a personal rivalry existed between them and, with Giovanni's death, Cesare was allowed to leave the Church as he wished, taking his brother's place as a man-at-arms and eventually the prospective ruler of a Borgia principality. The claim that Cesare was his brother's murderer is first found in a despatch of the Ferrarese ambassador at Venice: "I recently learned how the death of the Duke of Candia was caused by his brother, the Cardinal", he wrote on 22 February 1498. Cesare's role in the act has never been clear. However, he had no definitive motive, as he was likely to be given a powerful secular position, whether or not his brother lived. It is possible that Giovanni was killed as a result of a sexual liaison.

On 17 August 1498, Cesare resigned from the cardinalate in order to pursue a military career. On the same day, Louis XII named Cesare Duke of Valentinois. This random title was selected as being homophonous with his nickname Il Valentino ("The Valencian"), derived from his father's papal epithet in Latin Valentinus ("The Valencian") indicating his birth in Xàtiva in the Kingdom of Valencia under the Crown of Aragon, and along with Cesare's former position as Cardinal of Valencia. On 6 September 1499, he was released from all ecclesiastical duties and laicised from his diaconal orders (because he only was ordained deacon on 26 March 1494 and never received other major orders as priesthood and bishop consecration).

=== Military ===
Cesare's career was founded upon his father's ability to distribute patronage, along with his alliance with France (reinforced by his marriage with Charlotte d'Albret, sister of John III of Navarre), in the course of the Italian Wars. Louis XII invaded Italy in 1499; after Gian Giacomo Trivulzio had ousted its duke Ludovico Sforza, Cesare accompanied the king in his entrance into Milan.

At this point, Alexander decided to profit from the favorable situation and carve out for Cesare a state of his own in northern Italy. To this end, he declared that all his vicars in Romagna and Marche were deposed.

Cesare was appointed commander of the papal armies with a number of Italian mercenaries, supported by 300 cavalry and 4,000 Swiss infantry sent by the king of France. Alexander sent him to capture Imola and Forlì, ruled by Caterina Sforza (mother of the Medici condottiero Giovanni dalle Bande Nere). Despite being deprived of his French troops after the conquest of those two cities, Borgia returned to Rome to celebrate a triumph and to receive the title of Papal Gonfalonier from his father. In 1500, the creation of twelve new cardinals granted Alexander enough money for Cesare to hire the condottieri, Vitellozzo Vitelli, Gian Paolo Baglioni, Giulio and Paolo Orsini, and Oliverotto Euffreducci, who resumed his campaign in Romagna.

Giovanni Sforza, first husband of Cesare's sister Lucrezia, was soon ousted from Pesaro; Pandolfo Malatesta lost Rimini; Faenza surrendered, its young lord Astorre III Manfredi being later drowned in the Tiber by Cesare's order. In May 1501, the latter was created Duke of Romagna. Hired by Florence, Cesare subsequently added the lordship of Piombino to his new lands.

While his condottieri took over the siege of Piombino which ended in 1502, Cesare commanded the French troops in the sieges of Naples and Capua, defended by Prospero and Fabrizio Colonna. On 24 June 1501, Borgia's troops stormed the latter to end the siege of Capua.

In June 1502, he set out for Marche, where he was able to capture Urbino and Camerino by treason. He planned to conquer Bologna next. However, his condottieri, most notably Vitellozzo Vitelli and the Orsini brothers (Giulio, Paolo, and Francesco), feared Cesare's cruelty and set up a plot against him. Guidobaldo da Montefeltro and Giovanni Maria da Varano returned to Urbino and Camerino, and Fossombrone revolted. The fact that his subjects had enjoyed his rule thus far meant that his opponents had to work much harder than they would have liked. He eventually recalled his loyal generals to Imola, where he waited for his opponents' loose alliance to collapse. On 31 December 1502, Cesare called for a reconciliation, but imprisoned his condottieri in Senigallia, then called Sinigaglia, a feat described as a "wonderful deceiving" by historian Paolo Giovio, and had them strangled. In 1503, he conquered the Republic of San Marino.

== Later years and death ==
Although he was an immensely capable general and statesman, Cesare had trouble maintaining his domain without continued papal patronage. Niccolò Machiavelli cites Cesare's dependence on the goodwill of the papacy, under the control of his father, as being the principal disadvantage of his rule. Machiavelli argued that, had Cesare been able to win the favour of the new Pope, he would have been a very successful ruler. The news of his father's death in 1503 arrived when Cesare was planning the conquest of Tuscany. While he was convalescing in Castel Sant'Angelo from an attack of malarial fever (likely contracted on the same occasion when Alexander contracted his fatal illness), his troops controlled the September 1503 papal conclave.

The new pope, Pope Pius III, supported Cesare Borgia and reconfirmed him as Gonfaloniere, but after a brief pontificate of twenty-six days, he died. Borgia's deadly enemy, Giuliano Della Rovere, then succeeded by dexterous diplomacy in tricking the weakened Cesare Borgia into supporting him by offering him money and continued papal backing for Borgia policies in the Romagna; promises which he disregarded upon his election as Pope Julius II by the near-unanimous vote of the cardinals in the October 1503 papal conclave. Realizing his mistake by then, Cesare tried to correct the situation in his favour, but Pope Julius II made sure of its failure at every turn. Cesare was, for example, forced by Julius to give up San Marino, after occupying the republic for six months.

Cesare Borgia, who was facing the hostility of Ferdinand II of Aragon, was captured while in Naples by Gonzalo Fernández de Córdoba, a man he had considered his ally, and imprisoned there, while his lands were retaken by the papacy. In 1504, he was transferred to Spain and imprisoned first in the Castle of Chinchilla de Montearagón in La Mancha, but after an attempted escape he was moved north to the Castle of La Mota, Medina del Campo, near Segovia. He did manage to escape from the Castle of La Mota with assistance, and after running across Santander, Durango, and Gipuzkoa, he arrived in Pamplona on 3 December 1506, and was much welcomed by King John III of Navarre, who was missing an experienced military commander, ahead of the feared Castilian invasion.

Borgia recaptured Viana, Navarre, which had been in the hands of forces loyal to Louis de Beaumont, the count of Lerín and Ferdinand II of Aragon's conspiratorial ally in Navarre, but not the castle, which he then besieged. In the early morning of 12 March 1507, an enemy party of knights fled from the castle during a heavy storm. Outraged at the ineffectiveness of the siege, Borgia chased them, only to find himself on his own. The party of knights, discovering that he was alone, trapped him in an ambush, where he received a fatal injury from a spear. He was then stripped of all his luxurious garments, valuables, and a leather mask covering half his face. Borgia was left lying naked, and his body was left abandoned.

== Mortal remains ==
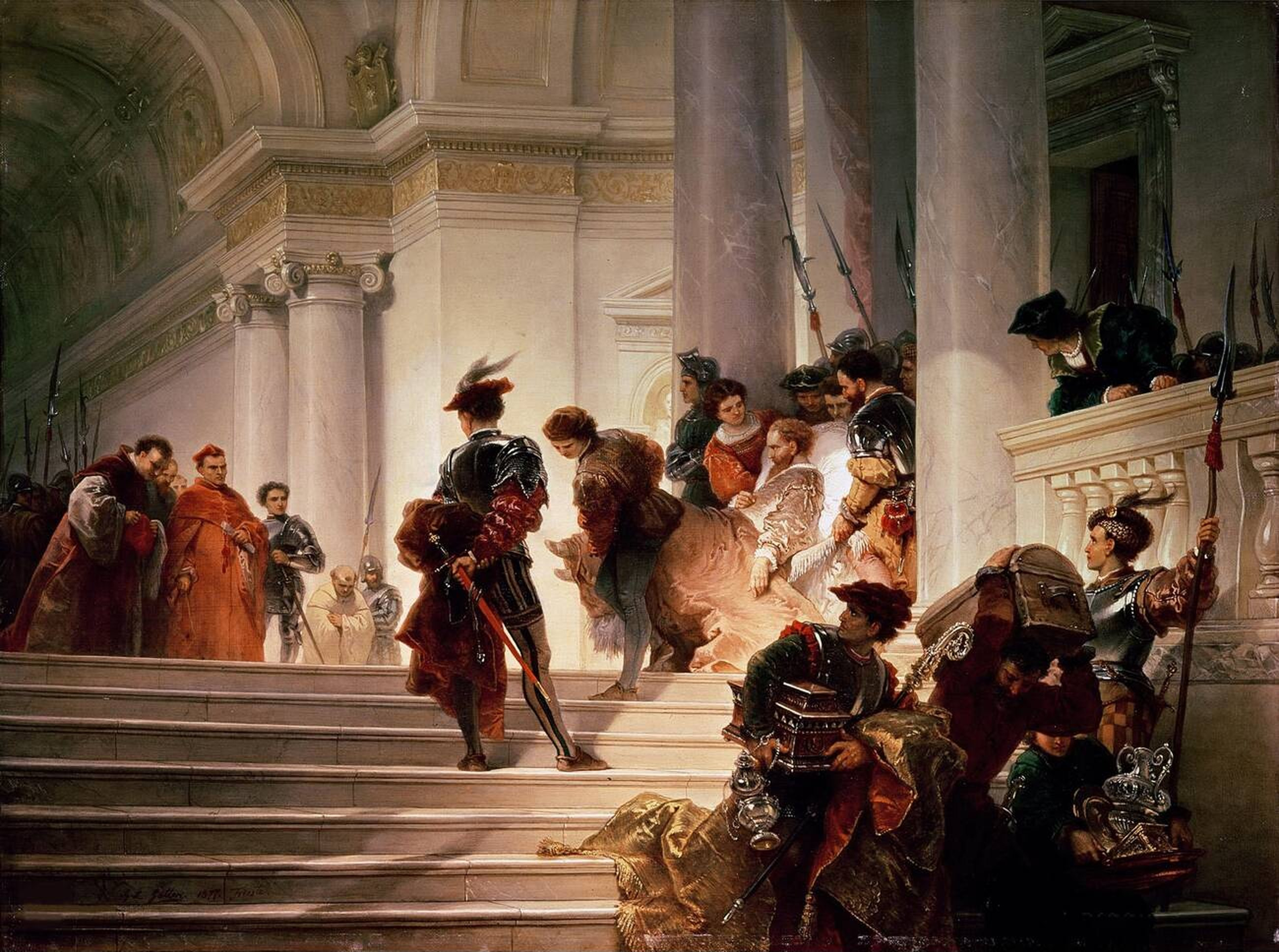
Cesare Borgia leaving the Vatican (1877) by Giuseppe Lorenzo Gatteri. Oil on canvas.

Borgia was originally buried in a marbled mausoleum that King John III had ordered built at the altar of the Church of Santa María in Viana in Navarre in northern Spain, set on one of the stops on the Camino de Santiago. In the 16th century, the Bishop of Mondoñedo, Antonio de Guevara, published from memory what he had seen written on the tomb when he had paid a visit to the church. This epitaph underwent several changes in wording and meter throughout the years, and the version most commonly cited today is that published by the priest and historian Francisco de Alesón in the 18th century. It reads:

Aquí yace en poca tierra
el que todo le temía
el que la paz y la guerra
en su mano la tenía.
Oh tú que vas a buscar
dignas cosas de loar:
si tú loas lo más digno,
aquí pare tu camino,
no cures de más andar.

Here lies in a little earth
he whom everyone feared,
he who held peace and war
in his hand.
Oh, you who go in search
of worthy things to praise,
if you would praise the worthiest
then your path stops here
and you do not need to go any further.

Borgia was an old enemy of Ferdinand of Aragon, and he was fighting the count who paved the way for Ferdinand's 1512 invasion against John III and Catherine of Navarre. While the circumstances are not well known, the tomb was destroyed sometime between 1523 and 1608, during which time Santa María was undergoing renovation and expansion. Tradition goes that a Bishop of Calahorra considered it inappropriate to have the remains of "that degenerate" lying in the church, so the opportunity was taken to tear down the monument and expel Borgia's bones to where they were reburied under the street in front of the church to be trodden on by all who walked through the town.

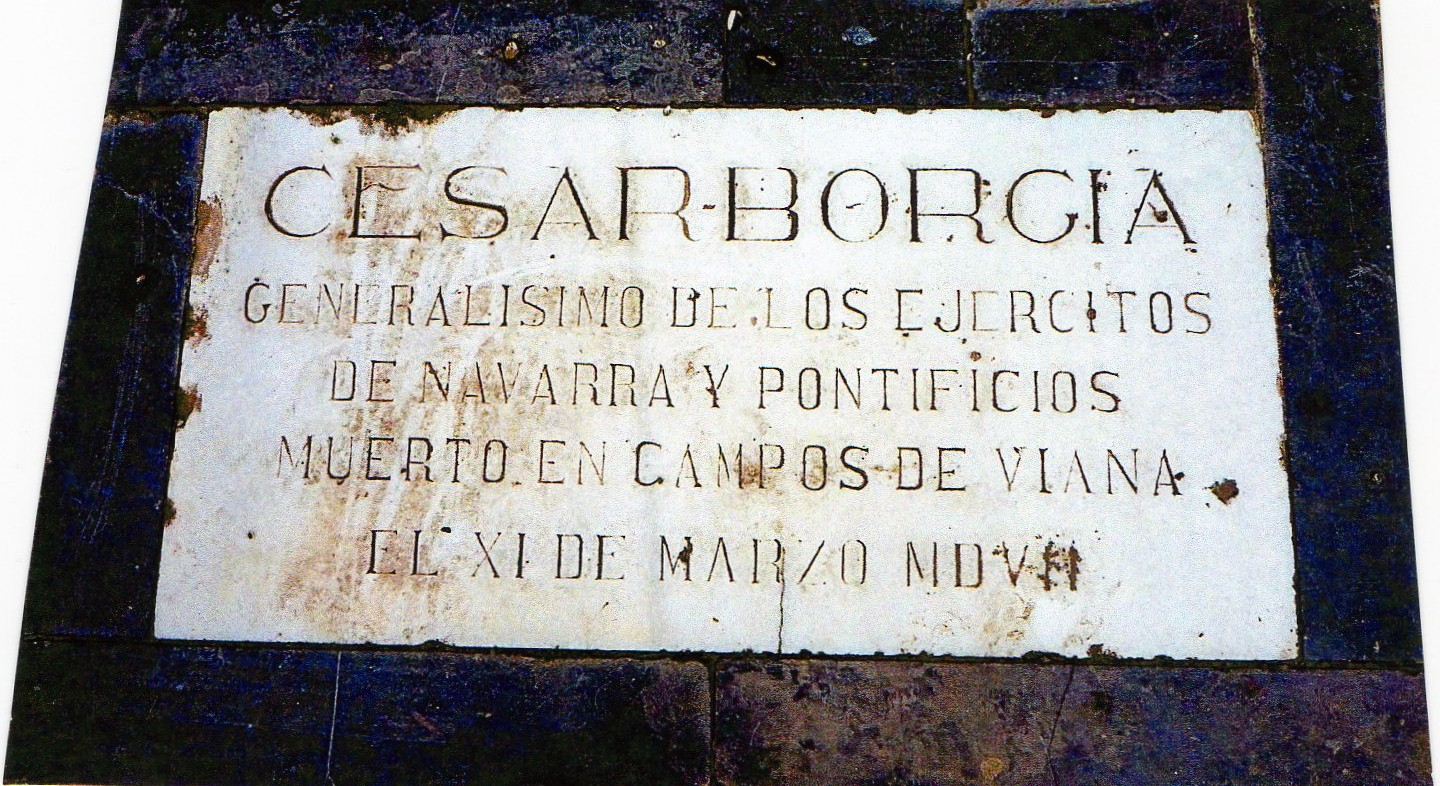
Cesare Borgia's memorial stone

Cesare Borgia's remains were then sent to Viana's town hall, directly across from Santa María, where they remained until 1953. They were then reburied immediately outside of the Church of Santa María, no longer under the street and in direct danger of being stepped on. A memorial stone was placed over it, which, translated into English, declared Borgia the Generalissimo of the papal as well as the Navarrese forces. A movement was made in the late 1980s to have Borgia dug up once more and put back into Santa María, but this proposal was ultimately rejected by church officials due to a recent ruling against the interment of anyone who did not hold the title of pope or cardinal.

Since Borgia had renounced the cardinalate, it was decided that it would be inappropriate for his bones to be moved into the church. It was reported that Fernando Sebastián Aguilar, the Archbishop of Pamplona, would acquiesce after more than 50 years of petitions and Borgia would finally be moved back inside the church on 11 March 2007, the day before the 500th anniversary of his death, but an Archbishopric spokesman declared that the church does not authorize any such practice. The local church said that "we have nothing against the transfer of his remains. Whatever he may have done in life, he deserves to be forgiven now."

== According to Niccolò Machiavelli ==
A Glass of Wine with Caesar Borgia (1893) by John Collier. From left: Cesare Borgia, Lucrezia Borgia, Pope Alexander VI, and a young man holding an empty glass. The painting represents the popular view of the treacherous nature of the Borgias—the implication being that the young man cannot be sure that the wine is not poisoned.

Niccolò Machiavelli met the Duke on a diplomatic mission in his function as Secretary of the Florentine Chancellery. Machiavelli was at Borgia's court from 7 October 1502 through 18 January 1503. During this time, he wrote regular dispatches to his superiors in Florence. Machiavelli uses Borgia as an example to elucidate the dangers of acquiring a principality by virtue of another. Machiavelli also dedicated one of his lesser-known works, The Description, which goes into detail documenting Borgia's response to the Magione conspiracy, as the duke, by way of deception, entrapped and then executed several rival Italian lords that he employed as mercenaries.

Machiavelli attributes two episodes to Cesare Borgia: the method by which the Romagna was pacified, which Machiavelli describes in chapter VII of The Prince, and the assassination of his captains on New Year's Eve of 1502 in Senigallia.

Some scholars see Machiavelli's Borgia as the precursor of state crimes in the 20th century. Others, including Macaulay and Lord Acton, have historicized Machiavelli's Borgia, explaining the admiration for such violence as an effect of the general criminality and corruption of the time.

There are accounts recorded by Machiavelli during his time spent with Cesare Borgia during his diplomatic trips. Machiavelli found that he could be at times secretive and taciturn, at other times loquacious and boastful. He alternated bursts of demonic activity when he stayed up all night receiving and dispatching messengers, with moments of unaccountable sloth when he remained in bed refusing to see anyone. He was quick to take offense and rather remote from his immediate entourage, yet he was very open with his subjects, loving to join local sports and cutting a dashing figure. However, at other times, Machiavelli observed Cesare as having "inexhaustible" energy and an unrelenting genius in military matters, and also diplomatic affairs, and he would go days and nights on end without seemingly requiring sleep.

== Leonardo da Vinci ==
Cesare Borgia briefly employed the artist Leonardo da Vinci as a military architect and engineer between 1502 and 1503. Cesare provided Leonardo with an unlimited pass to inspect and direct all ongoing and planned construction in his domain. While in Romagna, Leonardo built the canal from Cesena to the Porto Cesenatico.

Before meeting Cesare, Leonardo had worked at the Milanese court of Ludovico Sforza for many years, until Louis XII of France drove Sforza out of Italy. After Cesare, Leonardo was unsuccessful in finding another patron in Italy. King Francis I of France was able to convince Leonardo to enter his service, and the last three years of Leonardo's life were spent working in France.

== Personal life ==
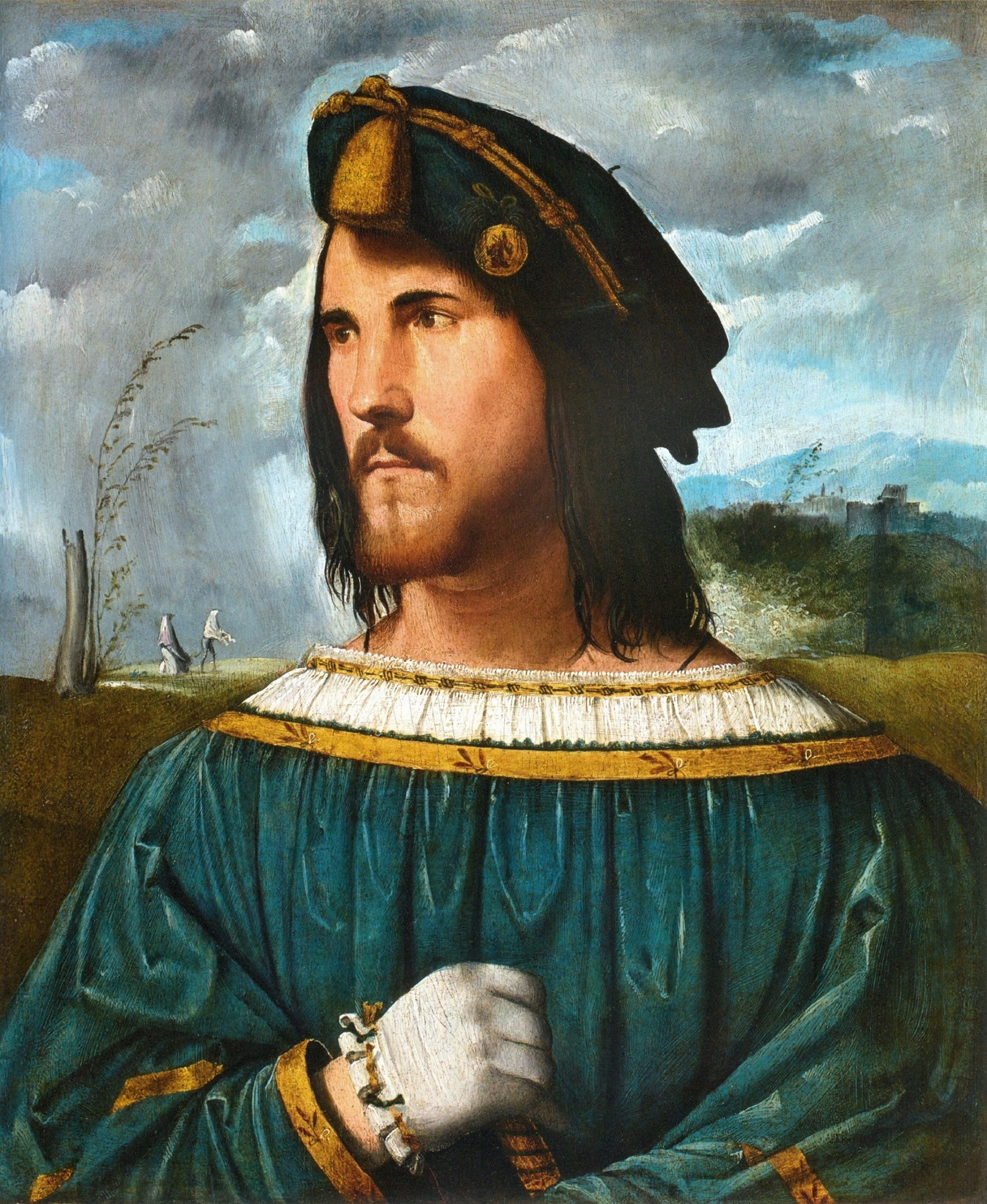
Portrait traditionally said to depict Cesare Borgia, by Altobello Melone

On 10 May 1499, Cesare married Charlotte of Albret (1480 – 11 March 1514), a sister of King John III of Navarre. The arrangement was part of a plan by the Navarrese monarchs to ease tensions with the newly proclaimed French King Louis XII by offering a royal blood bride in his dealings with the Holy See. They were parents to a daughter, Louise Borgia (1500–1553).

Cesare was also the father of several illegitimate children. Among them are Girolamo Borgia, who married Isabella Contessa di Carpi and Camilla Lucrezia Borgia (the younger), who, after Cesare's death, was moved to Ferrara to the court of her aunt Lucrezia Borgia (the elder).

== Character discussed in works of philosophy ==
- The Prince (1532) by Niccolò Machiavelli
- The Antichrist (1895) by Friedrich Nietzsche
- Beyond Good and Evil (1886) by Friedrich Nietzsche
- Twilight of the Idols (1889) by Friedrich Nietzsche
- Minima Moralia (1951) by Theodor Adorno
- The Philosophy of the Encounter (2006) by Louis Althusser
- Egoism and Freedom Movements: On the Anthropology of the Bourgeois Era (1982) by Max Horkheimer

== Non-fiction literature ==
- The Life of Cesare Borgia (1912) by Rafael Sabatini
- Cesare Borgia: The Machiavellian Prince (1942) by Carlo Beuf
- A Triptych of Poisoners (1958) by Jean Plaidy
- The Fall of the House of Borgia (1974) by E.R. (Eric Russell) Chamberlin
- Cesare Borgia (1976) by Sarah Bradford
- The Borgias (1981) by Sarah Bradford and John Prebble
- The Artist, The Philosopher and the Warrior (2009) by Paul Strathern
- The Borgias: The Hidden History (2013) by G. J. Meyer
- Cesare Borgia in a Nutshell (2016) by Samantha Morris

== Fictional portrayals ==
- Cesare is a character in Prince of Foxes, a 1947 historical fiction novel by Samuel Shellabarger. In the 1949 film adaptation of the story, he is portrayed by Orson Welles.
- In the 1981 BBC TV series The Borgias, Cesare is portrayed by Oliver Cotton.
- Cesare appears as the main antagonist of the 2010 video game Assassin's Creed: Brotherhood. He is voiced by Andreas Apergis. The game was developed primarily by Ubisoft Montreal with contributions by four other Ubisoft branches: Annecy, Singapore, Bucharest, and Quebec City.
- In The Borgias, a 2011 American TV series, Cesare is portrayed by Francois Arnaud.
- In Borgia, a 2011 European TV series, Cesare is portrayed by Mark Ryder.
- In series 4 of Horrible Histories, the cast performed a parody of The Addams Family about the lives of the Borgia family. Mathew Baynton portrayed Cesare Borgia.
- The Hatsune Miku and KAITO song "Cantarella" is based on Cesare Borgia and his sister Lucrezia Borgia.
- The Cantarella manga by You Higuri is a dark fantasy historical fiction on Cesare's life with some supernatural elements.
- Cesare: Il Creatore che ha distrutto is a manga by Fuyumi Soryo that chronicles his life from the age of 15. A musical adaptation premiered in 2023. Cesare was portrayed by Akinori Nakagawa in the original cast.
- Cesare is a character in The Family, an historical fiction novel created by The Godfather author Mario Puzo.
- In Brazilian literature, César Borgia is one of the main characters in the novel The Devil's Strip, by Miguel M. Abrahão

== See also ==
- Rocca di Borgia
- Route of the Borgias

== Notes ==
Italian nobility
Preceded by Ottaviano Riario	Lord of Forlì; 1499–1503	Succeeded by Antonio II Ordelaffi
Preceded by Ottaviano Riario	Lord of Imola; 1499–1503	To the Papal States
Preceded by Pandolfo IV Malatesta	Lord of Rimini; 1500–1503	Succeeded by Pandolfo IV Malatesta
Preceded by Astorre III Manfredi	Lord of Faenza; 1501–1503	Succeeded by Astorre IV Manfredi
Preceded by Guidobaldo da Montefeltro	Duke of Urbino; 1502–1503	Succeeded by Guidobaldo da Montefeltro
Catholic Church titles
Preceded by Rodrigo Borgia	Archbishop of Valencia; 1492–1498	Succeeded by Juan Borgia
Preceded by Giovanni Borgia	Captain General of the Church; 1500–1503	Succeeded by Francesco Maria I della Rovere
Preceded by Giovanni Borgia	Gonfalonier of the Church; 1500–1503	Succeeded by Guidobaldo da Montefeltro
