= Pandolfo Petrucci =

Italian ruler

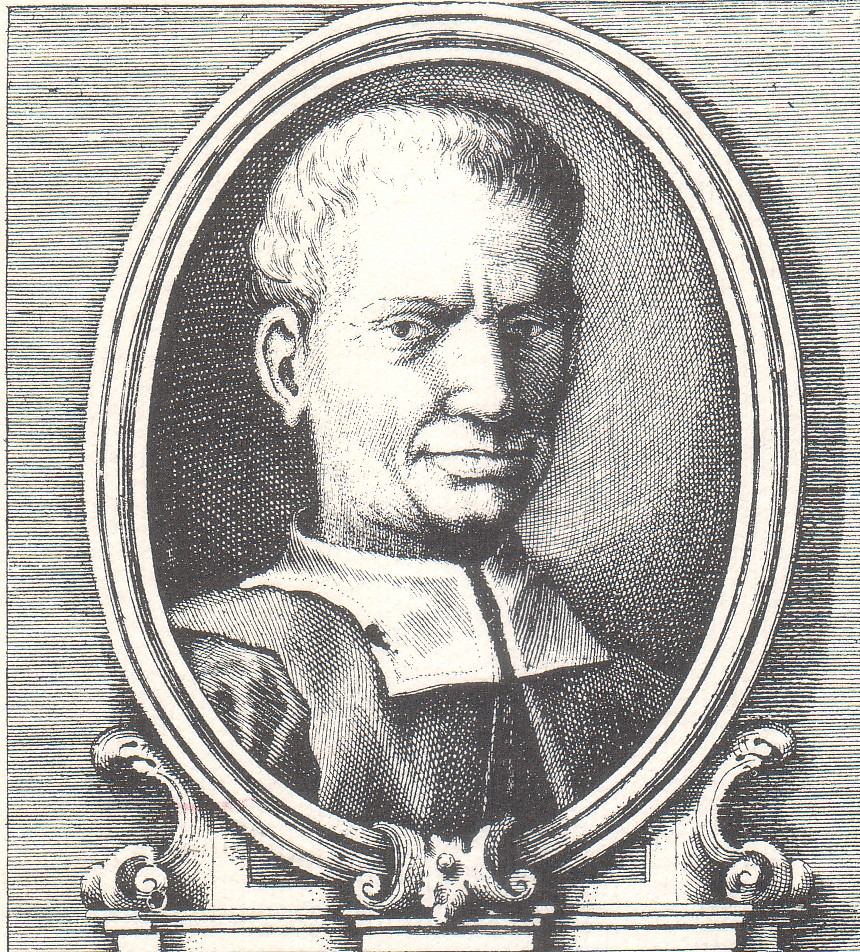
Pandolfo Petrucci

Pandolfo Petrucci (14 February 1452 – 21 May 1512) was the lord of Siena during the Renaissance.

== Biography ==
Petrucci was born and raised in Siena, into an aristocratic family of wealthy merchants. When Petrucci was still a child, in 1456, his family was forced into exile due to his uncle, Antonio Petrucci, being involved in a failed conspiracy against the Republic of Siena. The family moved to Pisa. In 1480 the presence in Tuscany of the army of Duke Alfonso of Calabria allowed the exiles to return to the city.

In 1481, he was admitted to the People's Council with his brothers Alessandro and Vittorio. In October 1482 he married Eufrasia Martinozzi. He joined his brother Vittorio in Paganico, where the family had property. He then moved to Montepulciano, before joining his brother Giacoppo in Pisa.

By 1487, he had married his second wife, Aurelia Borghesi, daughter of Niccolo, one of the most important men in Siena. with the support of Cardinal Piccolomini, nephew of Pope Pius II, and assistance from his brother Giacopo (died 1497). He later became captain of the city guard in 1495. He was part of the committee that hired Francesco di Giorgio Martini to renovate the city's defenses. It was through this guard that he set up his base of power.

=== Rise to power ===
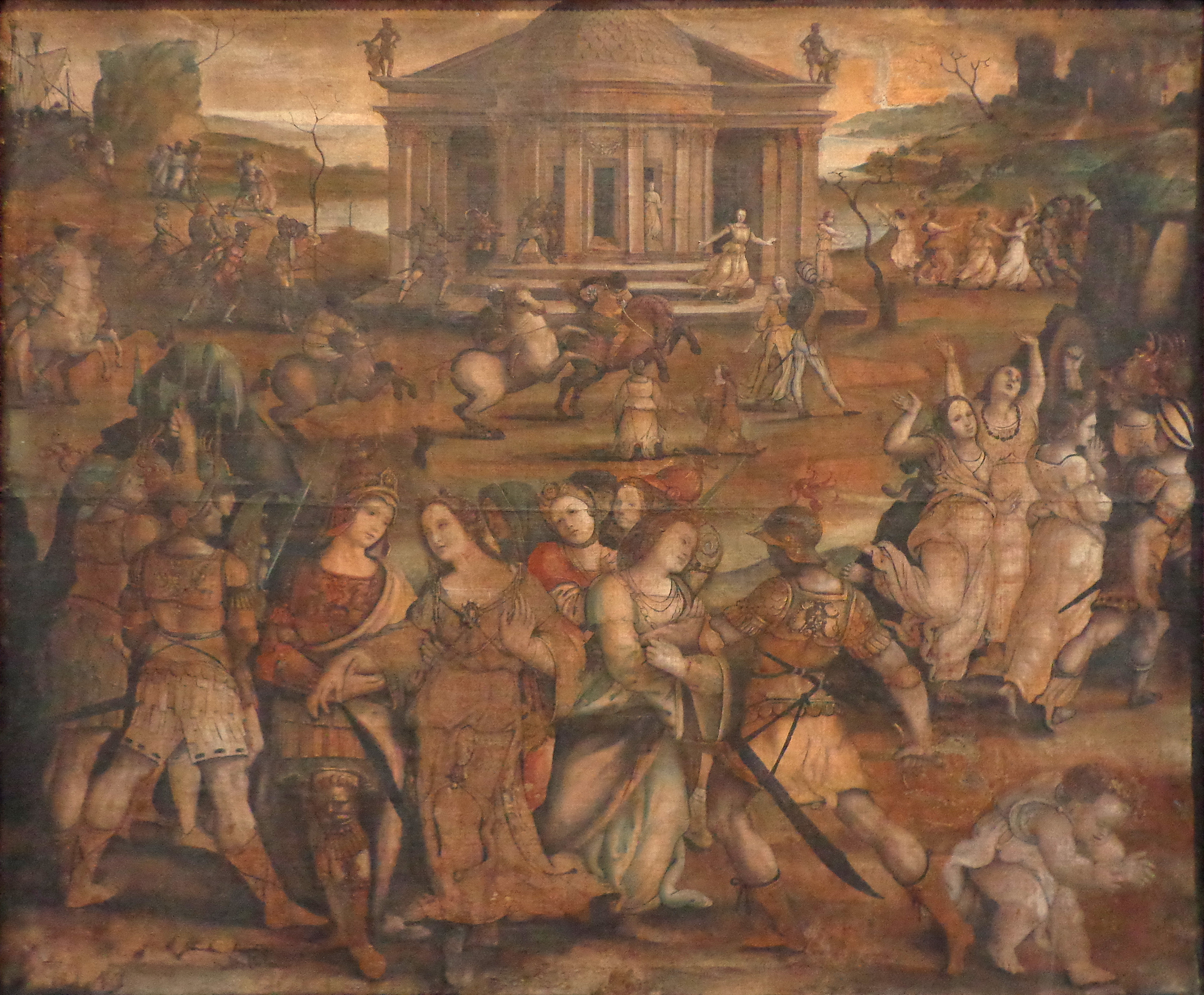
The Abduction of Helen, painting by Girolamo Genga, originally in Petrucci's palace in Siena.

When his brother Giacopo died in 1497, Petrucci assumed all of his offices and seized control of his fortune. With his father-in-law's backing, Petrucci assumed a number of public offices and gained a vast amount of political power. He subsequently used this power to sell public offices or to give them to his lackeys, a strategy which allowed him to become the most powerful man in Siena. However, Petrucci's power and his organization of followers in Siena's government gained him many enemies, including his father-in-law. Niccolò and other influential citizens of Siena conspired to assassinate Petrucci, but Petrucci uncovered the plot and had Niccolò murdered in 1500.

With his enemies out of the way, Petrucci ruled as absolute tyrant over Siena. Petrucci subsequently stopped selling public offices in order to consolidate his own power. Although a brutal authoritarian and absolutist, Petrucci was careful to pacify the people of Siena by improving the city's economy and encouraging the advancement of art. He also managed to avoid a war with Florence, which had been at odds with Siena for over a century due to a dispute over Siena's control of Montepulciano.

When France and Spain invaded the Italian Peninsula, Petrucci became involved in a number of political intrigues. During this time period, Petrucci tried to gain the powerful Cesare Borgia's trust by diplomatically procuring French-controlled Piombino for Borgia. However, he secretly plotted against Borgia along with other lords at the meeting of Magione in the hopes of increasing his own power. Borgia, who had never trusted Petrucci, learned of the Sienese tyrant's plans and, after he found out about the conspiracy, made attempts to eliminate Petrucci along with his other enemies. Petrucci suspected his life was in danger and fled Siena in January 1503 in order to avoid Borgia's killers. He subsequently resided in Lucca. With the assistance of his ally King Louis XII of France, however, Petrucci was returned to power two months later. Je later, in 1509, sent a small military contingent to assist the French against Venice in the Battle of Agnadello.

=== Later years ===
Before his death, Petrucci was known to have plotted in secret with Spain and Pope Julius II against his old allies, the French. He was also rumored to have had Pope Pius III poisoned in 1503.

With Borgia's death in 1507, Petrucci became one of the most powerful men in Italy. In his final years, Petrucci supported Pisa militarily in its war against Florence. However, Pope Julius II and Spain forced Petrucci to make peace with Florence, to which he reluctantly gave the territory of Montepulciano in 1512. In return, the pope made Petrucci's son, Alfonso Petrucci, a cardinal. Later that year, Petrucci handed control of Siena over to his son, Borghese Petrucci, and died shortly afterwards in San Quirico d'Orcia, Italy.

He was a generous patron of the Basilica dell'Osservanza, where he was buried next to his father.

Following Pandolfo's death, the Petrucci family ruled Siena until 1524.
