= Petrucci =

Petrucci may refer to

- Petrucci family, a royal Renaissance family from Italy
- Petrucci (surname)
- Petrucci Music Library

== See also ==
- Petruccio (disambiguation)
