= Vannoccio Biringuccio =

Italian metallurgist

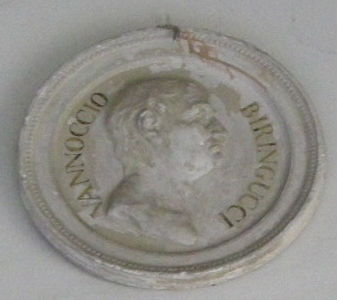
- Vannoccio Biringuccio as depicted in the Specola Museum in Florence.
- Born: c. 1480; Siena
- Died: c. 1539 (aged 58 or 59)
- Parent(s): Paolo Biringuccio and Lucrezia di Bartolommeo Biringuccio.
- Engineering career
- Significant advance: metallurgist

Vannoccio Biringuccio, sometimes spelled Vannocio Biringuccio (c. 1480 – c. 1539), was an Italian metallurgist. He is best known for his manual on metalworking, De la pirotechnia, published posthumously in 1540.

== Biography ==
Biringuccio was born in Siena as the son of Paolo Biringuccio, presumably an architect, and Lucrezia di Bartolommeo Biringuccio. He was baptised on October 20, 1480.

He was a follower of Pandolfo Petrucci, the head of the powerful Petrucci family. Pandolfo employed him as a metallurgist. When Pandolfo died, Biringuccio remained tied to the Petrucci family, being employed by Pandolfo's son Borghese Petrucci. However, the uprising of 1515 forced Borghese to flee from Siena, taking Biringuccio with him. Biringuccio traveled about Italy, and visited Sicily in 1517.

In 1523 Pope Clement VII caused the reinstatement of the Petrucci family, and along with them Biringuccio was able to return from exile. In 1524 he was granted a monopoly on the production of saltpeter across all of Siena. However, this was short lived—in 1526, the people of Siena revolted and threw the Petrucci family out again. The family made an attempt (aided by Biringuccio) to regain Siena by force, but it failed.

In 1530, Siena entered a more peaceful phase, and Biringuccio returned. He was a Senator of the city in January and February 1531, and took part in various projects.

In 1536, he was offered a job in Rome by the Church, and in 1538 he became head of the papal foundry, and director of munitions.

His exact place and date of death is unknown; all that is known is that a document dated 1539 mentions his death.

== Work ==
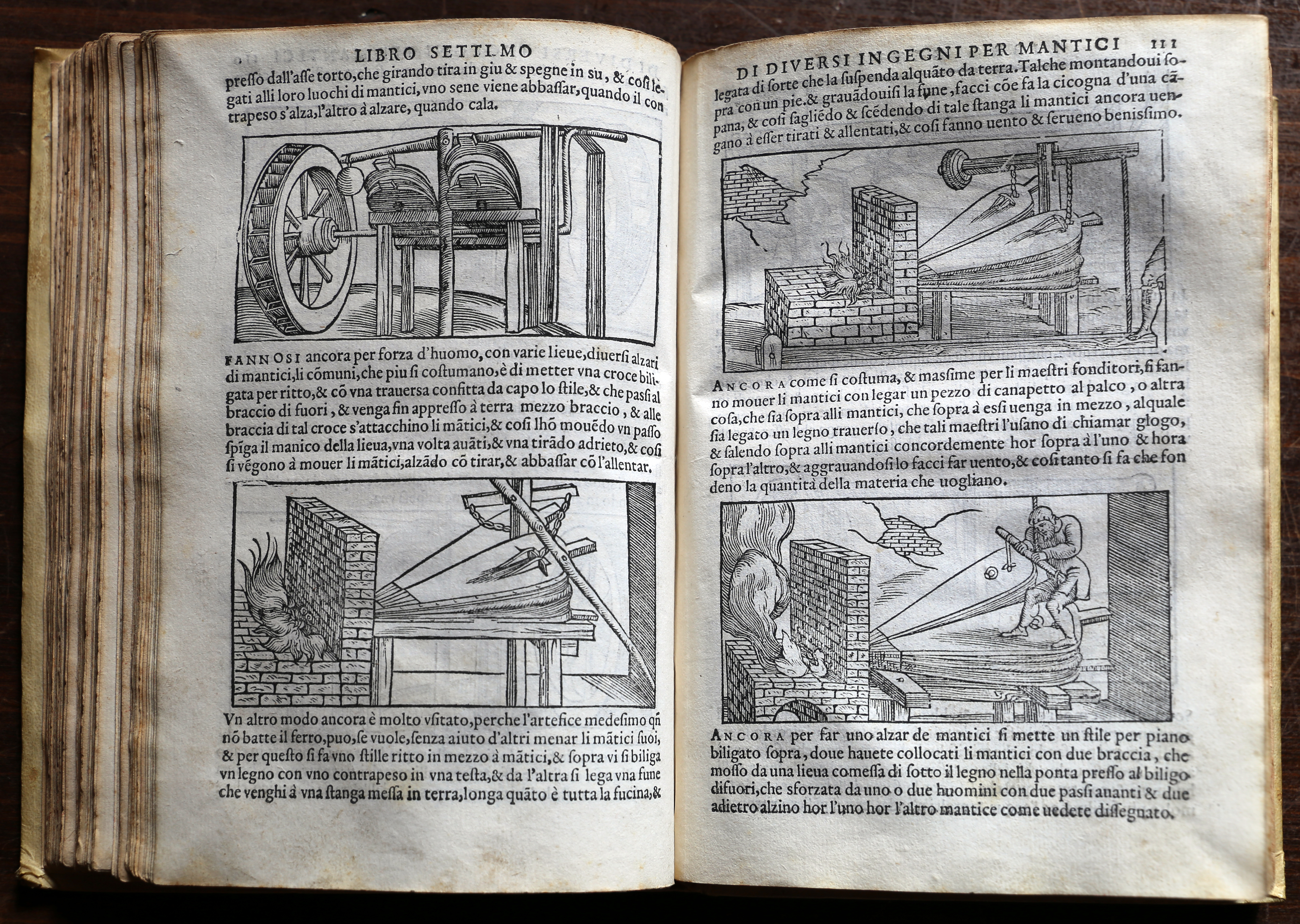
Pirotechnia

Biringuccio is considered by some as the father of the foundry industry, as his De la pirotechnia is the first printed account of proper foundry practice. It also gives details of mining practice, the extraction and refining of numerous metals, alloys such as brass, and compounds used in foundries and explosives. It preceded the printing of De re metallica by Georgius Agricola by 14 years.

Biringuccio was a member of the secretive guild Fraternità di Santa Barbara. Before his book's publication, information on metallurgy and military arts were closely held secrets; his book is credited with starting the tradition of scientific and technical literature.

In his career, he was in charge of an iron mine near Siena, and also in charge of its mint and arsenal. He was in charge of casting cannons for Venice and later Florence.

=== De la pirotechnia ===
The work is one of earliest technical manuscripts to survive from the Renaissance, and is thus a valuable source of information on technical practice at the time of writing. The work was printed in 1540 in Venice, and has been reprinted numerous times.

It is divided into ten books dealing with minerals, semi-minerals, assaying, smelting, the separation of gold from silver, alloys, the art of casting metals (especially bells and cannons), and alchemy. He describes in detail the way moulds are made for casting so as to avoid defects, including the way patterns are made for the final product shape.

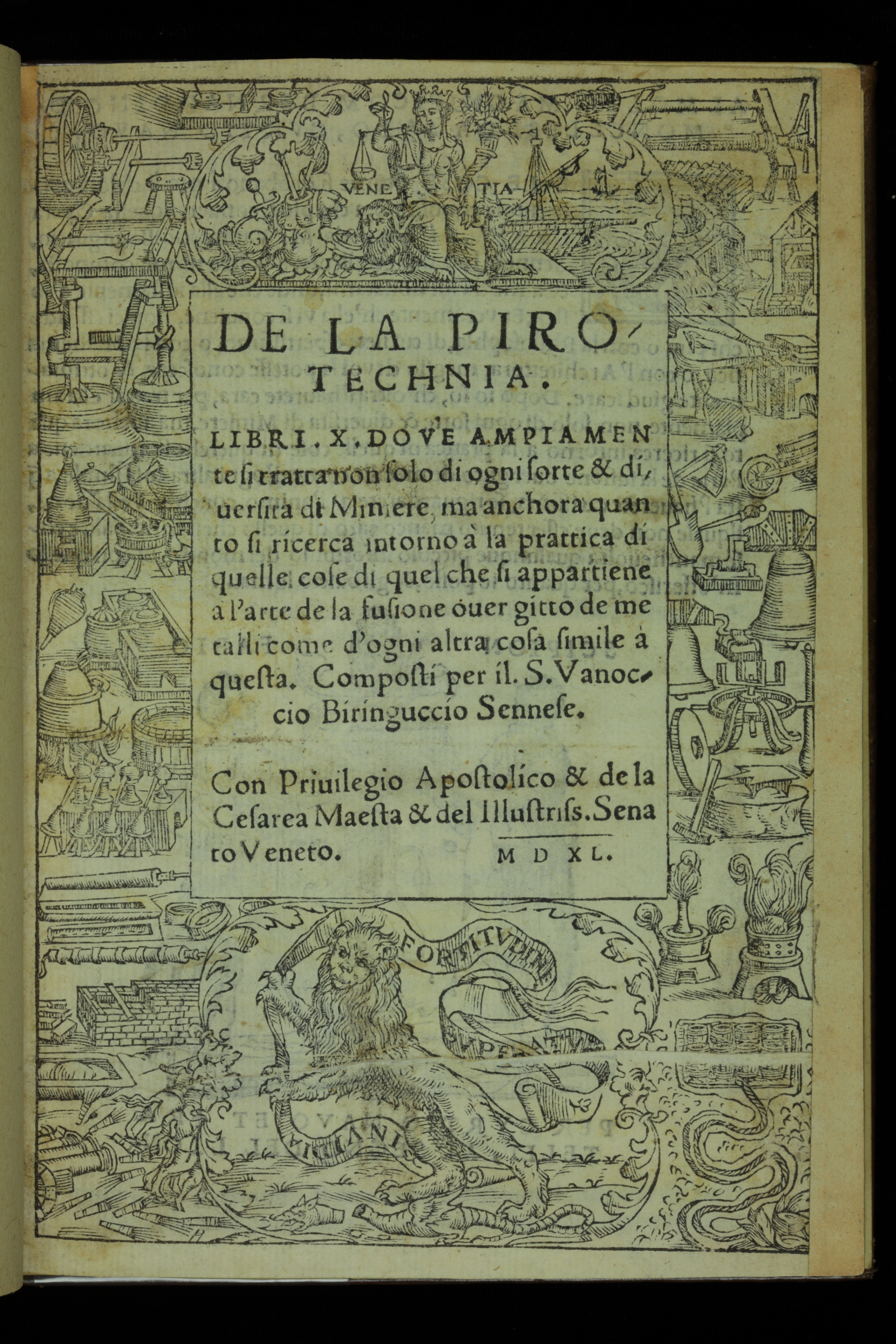
Title page, De la pirotechnia, 1540

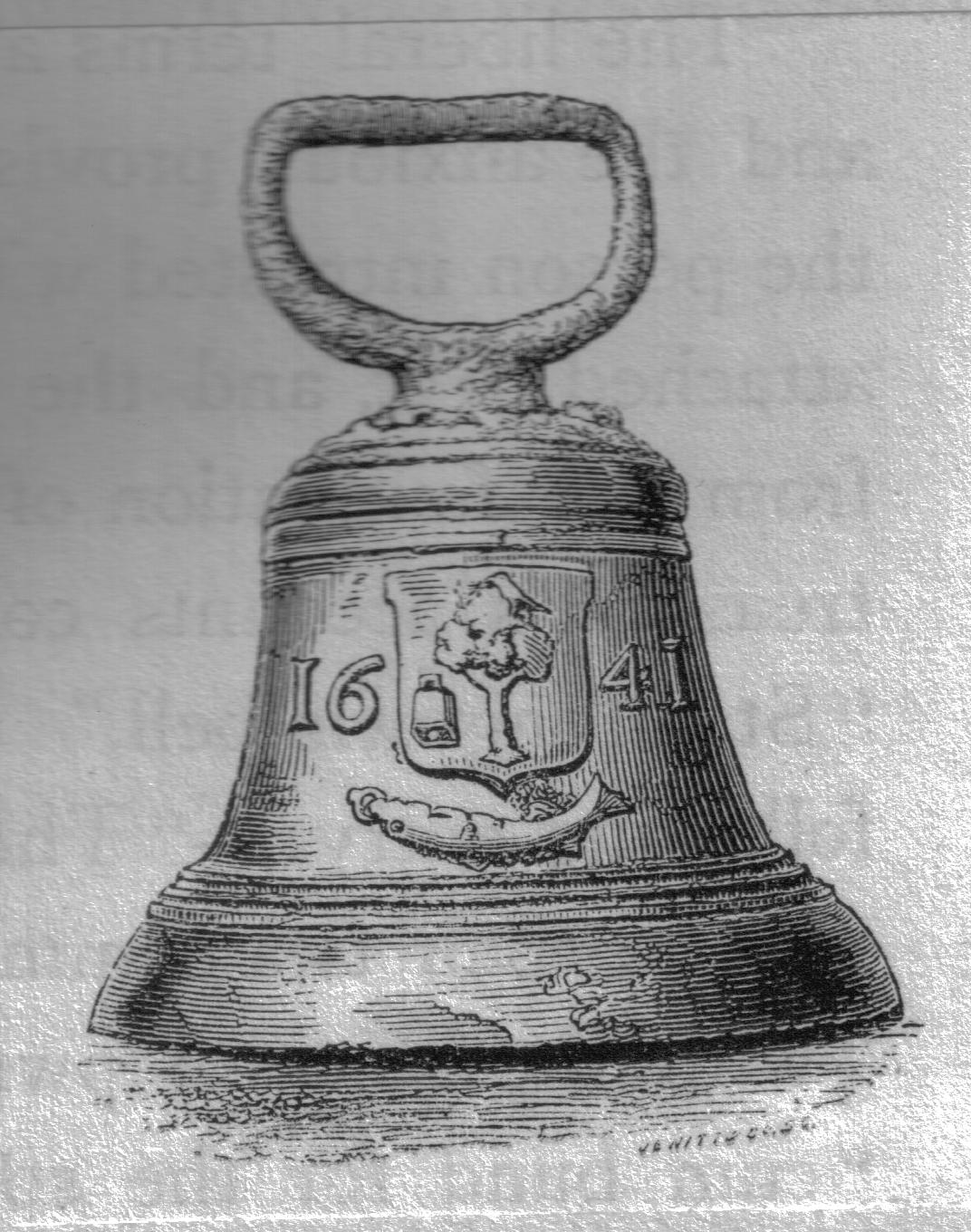
The Glasgow 'Dead or Deid bell' of 1642

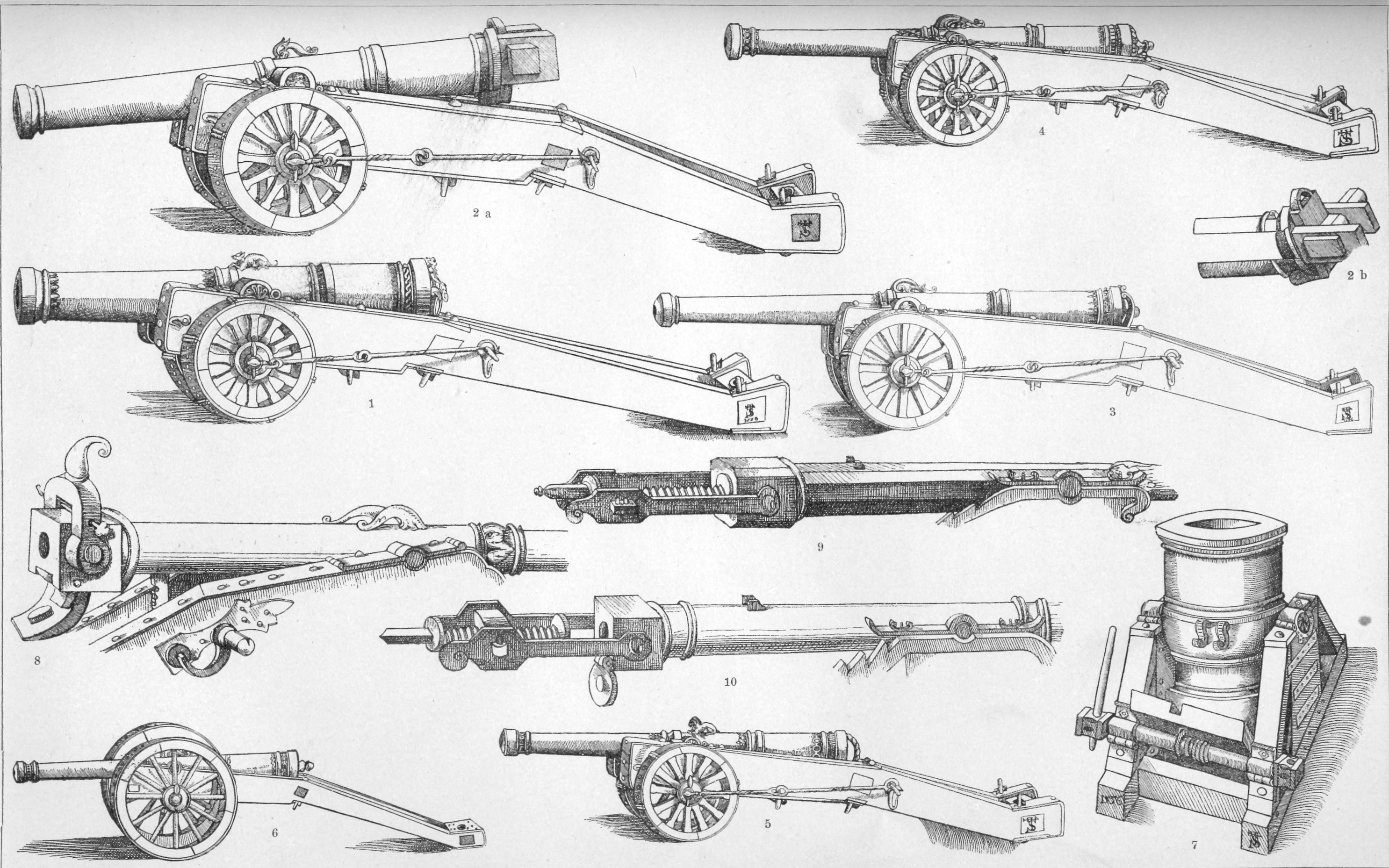
Various 16th-century artillery pieces, including culverin, falconet and mortar

== See also ==
- Georgius Agricola
- De re metallica
- Kazimierz Siemienowicz
