= Petrucci (surname) =

Petrucci is an Italian surname. Notable people with the surname include:

15th–19th centuries

- Alessandro Petrucci (died 1628), Italian Roman Catholic Archbishop of Siena and Bishop of Massa Marittima
- Alfonso Petrucci (c. 1490–1517), Italian Roman Catholic cardinal
- Antonello Petrucci, also known as Antonello d'Aversa (died 1487), Italian Baron and secretary to King Ferdinand I of Naples
- Borghese Petrucci (1512–1516), Italian politician, ruler of Siena
- Domenico Petrucci (died 1598), Italian Roman Catholic Bishop of Bisignano and later Bishop of Strongoli
- Giovanni Alfonso Petrucci (1650–1688), Roman Catholic Bishop of Belcastro
- Ottaviano Petrucci (1466–1539) Italian printer, producer of sheet music
- Pandolfo Petrucci (1452–1512) ruler of Siena
- Pier Matteo Petrucci, C.O. (1636–1701), Italian Roman Catholic cardinal
- Raffaello Petrucci (1472–1522), cardinal, ruler of Siena

20th century

- A. J. Petrucci, American professional wrestler
- Cinzia Petrucci (born 1955) Italian shot putter
- Danilo Petrucci (born 1991) Italian motorcyclist
- Davide Petrucci (born 1991) Italian football (soccer) player
- Gianni Petrucci (born 1945) Italian sports director
- Giovanna Petrucci (born 1998), Brazilian athlete
- John Petrucci (born 1967) American rock guitarist
- Loretto Petrucci (1929–2016) Italian cyclist
- Luigi Petrucci (born 1956) Italian actor
- Mario Petrucci (born 1958), English poet, literary translator, educator and broadcaster
- Roxy Petrucci (born 1960) American drummer
