= De la pirotechnia =

1540 metallurgy book by Vannoccio Biringuccio

The pirotechnia of Vannoccio Biringuccio
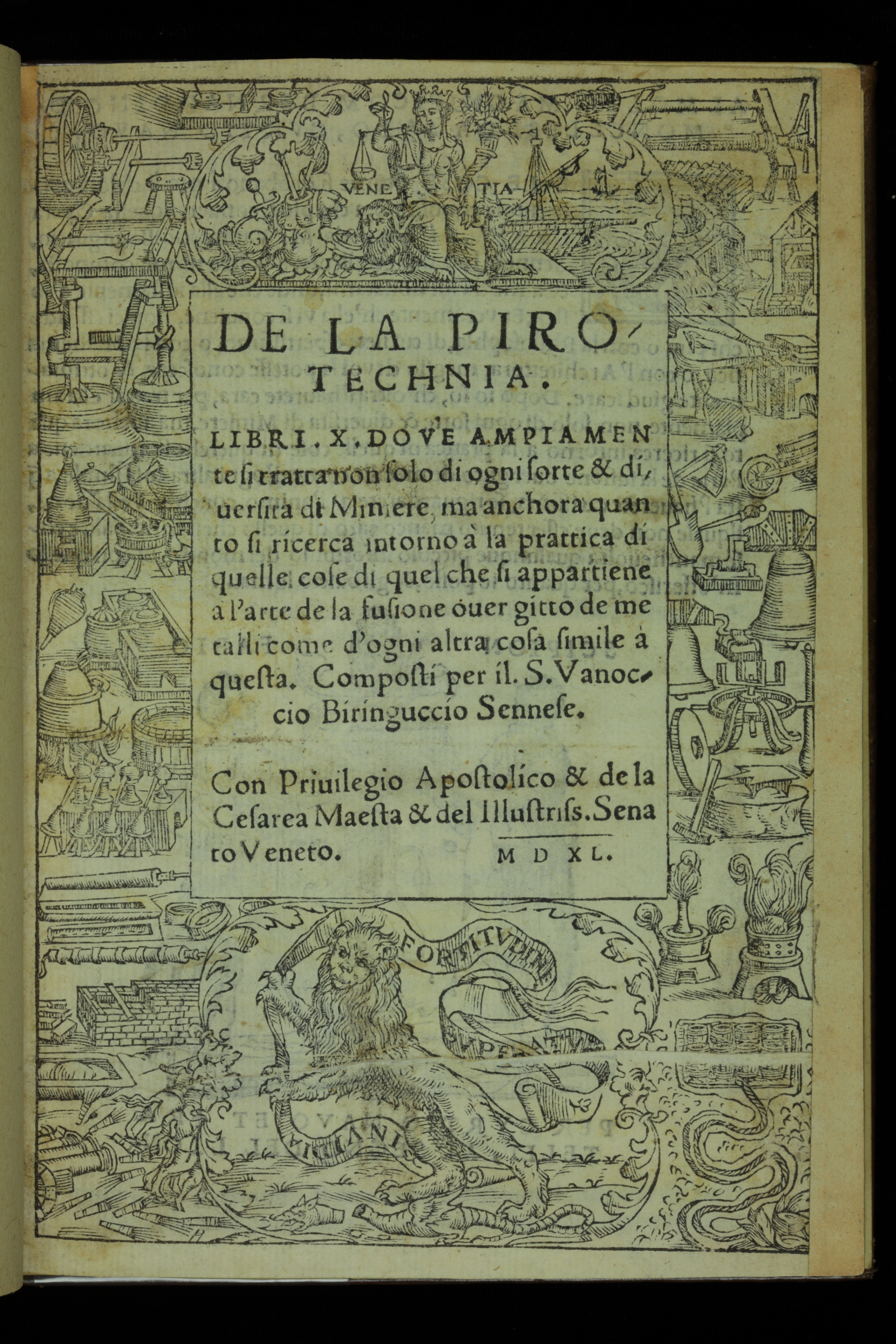
- Title page, De la pirotechnia, 1540, Science History Museum
- Author: Vannoccio Biringuccio
- Original title: De la pirotechnia
- Translator: Cyril Stanley Smith, Martha Teach Gnudi
- Language: Italian
- Subject: Metallurgy
- Genre: informative
- Published: 1540 (original); 1942 (in English) The American Institute of Mining and Metallurgical Engineers
- Publication place: Italy
- Media type: paperback
- Pages: 477
- ISBN: 0-486-26134-4
- OCLC: 20671722
- Dewey Decimal: 669 20
- LC Class: TN144 .B4513 1990
- Followed by: 1959 edition

De la Pirotechnia is considered to be one of the first printed books on metallurgy to have been published in Europe. It was written in Italian and first published in Venice in 1540. The author was Vannoccio Biringuccio, a citizen of Siena, Italy, who died before it was published. Further editions were published in 1550, 1558, 1559, and 1678, with a (sloppy) French translation by Jacques Vincent being published in 1556, 1572, and 1627. Parts were translated into Latin (by Georgius Agricola), English (Richard Eden; Peter Whitehorn) and Spanish (Bernardo Perez de Vargas) at various times in the 1550s and 1560s, generally without acknowledgement. The second book on metallurgy, De re metallica, was written in Latin by Georgius Agricola, and published in 1556.

Mining was typically left to professionals, craftsmen and experts who were not eager to share their knowledge. Much experiential knowledge had been accumulated over the course of time. This knowledge was consecutively handed down orally within a small group of technicians and mining overseers. In the Middle Ages these people held the same leading role as the master builders of the great cathedrals, or perhaps also alchemists. It was a small, cosmopolitan elite within which existing knowledge was passed on and further developed but not shared with the outside world. Only a few writers from that time wrote anything about mining itself. Partly, that was because this knowledge was very difficult to access. Most writers also found it simply not worth the effort to write about it. Only after the middle ages did this perception begin to change. With the improved transport and the invention of the printing press knowledge spread much more easily and faster than before. In 1500, the first printed book dedicated to mining engineering, called the Nutzlich Bergbuchleyn (The Useful Little Mining Book") by Ulrich Rulein von Calw, was published. Both De la pirotechnia and De re metallica were translated into English in the 20th century. The translation of Pirotechnia was by Cyril Stanley Smith, a senior chemist on the Manhattan Project, and Martha Teach Gnudi. Both books were illustrated with extensive, beautiful woodcuts.

The majority of the work is devoted to the more technical aspects of metalworking (such as the mining, assaying and smelting of ores), but Biringuccio also provides insights into the humanistic philosophy of the Italian Renaissance. Alchemy is also discussed.

== Editions ==
- De la pirotechnia (in Italian). Bari. 1914 – via Società tipografica editrice barese.
- Vannoccio Biringuccio (1959) [1540]. De la pirotechnia. Dover books on earth sciences: Dover Classics of Science and Mathematics. Translated by Cyril Stanley Smith; Martha Teach Gnudi. Courier Dover Publications. p. 477. ISBN 9780486261348.
