= Bernd Zirkler =

German economist

Bernd Zirkler (* 27 March 1970 in Stuttgart, Germany) is a German economist. He holds the Chair of General Business Administration, in particular financial accounting and management accounting, at the West Saxon University of Applied Sciences in Zwickau (Westsächsische Hochschule Zwickau), is Vice Dean of the Faculty of Economics and Executive Director of the Institute of Business Administration.

== Private and academic life ==
In the period from 1991 to 1996, Bernd Zirkler studied business administration at the University of Erlangen–Nuremberg, graduating with a diploma in business administration with a focus on financial accounting, management accounting, industrial management and business English. He then became a research assistant at Wolfgang Männel's Chair of financial accounting and management accounting at the Faculty of Economics and Social Sciences at the University of Erlangen–Nuremberg. In 1996, Zirkler completed a research period with Robert S. Kaplan at the Harvard Business School. In May 2001, Zirkler received his doctorate on "Leadership-oriented US-American Management Accounting" at the University of Erlangen–Nuremberg. In January 2009 he received his postdoctoral qualification on " Cash flow statements - development within the framework of national and international accounting standards and possible applications in financial and value-oriented management accounting" at the University of Erlangen–Nuremberg. In March 2009, Zirkler was appointed to the cornerstone professorship for general business administration, focusing on financial accounting and management accounting, at the Westsächsische Hochschule Zwickau. Zirkler received an honorary doctorate from the Kazakh-American Free University Oskemen in September 2019 for his academic and scientific commitment.
Bernd Zirkler is married and father to a son and a daughter.

== Career ==
Zirkler has been involved in both national and international teaching and research for many years and is committed to various practice transfers on different accounting and controlling related topics. Besides his work as a professor at the Westsächsische Hochschule Zwickau, Bernd Zirkler has been a lecturer and speaker at various universities such as the Catholic University of Eichstätt-Ingolstadt, the EBS University of Business and Law, and universities of applied sciences such as the Weihenstephan-Triesdorf University of Applied Science and the Ingolstadt University of Technology, as well as international universities such as the Chinese-German University of Applied Sciences (CDHAW) and the University of the West of Scotland. Zirkler is a member of the Faculty Council of the Faculty of Economic Sciences and the Extended Senate of the Westsächsische Hochschule Zwickau, as well as a member of the Association of German Engineers' working group on cost simulation, and the Association of University Lecturers in Business Administration. At the Faculty of Economic Sciences, Zirkler is a doctoral supervisor, since June 2012 Vice-Dean, and since January 2014 Deputy Director of the Institute of Business Administration. Internationally, Zirkler is actively involved in the German University Consortium for International Cooperation as a lecturer at international partner universities and as the expert coordinator for sustainable development of the Mexican-German University Cooperation. Bernd Zirkler is also engaged in the cooperation with international universities for the purpose of student exchange or cooperative doctoral procedures with universities such as the Tongji University in Shanghai, the Monterrey Institute of Technology and Higher Education in Monterrey, and the University of the West of Scotland. Zirkler's research focuses on financial accounting and management accounting, mainly in the fields of integrated management accounting concepts, international accounting and US management accounting. He publishes national and international scientific articles and books and lectures at professional congresses as well as at international universities. Zirkler is the head of national and international research projects. He is a consultant for professional journals (e.g. Die Unternehmung, Controlling and Management Review, Kostenrechnungspraxis). Since 2006, Zirkler has been practicing as a freelance consultant and trainer for the management consultancy Horváth & Partners, among others. He is also closely involved in the preparation of business management reports in the health care and energy sectors, as well as working with small and medium-sized companies on application-related financial accounting and management accounting issues. Zirkler is a scientific advisor to the student consultancy MAXX! Consulting.

== Selected scientific publications ==
- Hinaus in die Welt: Ergebnisse der Studierendenbefragung zu ihrer studienbezogenen Auslandsmobilität Ergebnisbericht der Mobilitätsstudie 2019 – Auslandsmobilität von Studierenden, ausgerichtet auf die Zielländer des DHIK, Ergebnisbericht zur empirischen Studie, Zwickau 2019 (together with Melanie Weber, Nadine Gerhardt, Philipp Schäfer).
- Qualitätsbezogenes Target Costing als integriertes Steuerungsinstrument im Entwicklungsprozess von Exoskeletten in: Weidner, Robert; Karafillidis, Athanasios (Hrsg.): Dritte Transdisziplinäre Konferenz, Hamburg 2018 (together with Nadine Gerhardt und Robert Weidner)
- Kennzahlengestütztes Finanzcontrolling auf Basis von Kapitalflussrechnungen in: Ulrich, Patrick; Baltzer, Björn (Hrsg.): Wertschöpfung in der Betriebswirtschaftslehre – Festschrift für Wolfgang Becker zum 65. Geburtstag, Wiesbaden 2019, S. 187–228 (together with Jonathan Hofmann). ISBN 9783658185725
- Management Accounting in den USA in: Becker, Wolfgang: Praxishandbuch Controlling, Wiesbaden 2016, S. 567–582. ISBN 9783658047078
- Kapitalflussrechnungen – Erstellung im Rahmen nationaler und internationaler Rechnungslegungsnormen und Anwendungsmöglichkeiten im finanz- und wertorientierten Controlling, Nürnberg 2008 (postdoctoral thesis).
- Führungsorientiertes US-amerikanisches Management Accounting – Entwicklung – Aufgabenfelder – Spezifika Wiesbaden 2002 (doctoral thesis). ISBN 9783409118682.
