= Bernardo Pérez de Vargas =

Bernardo Perez de Vargas (fl. 1545-1569) was a Spanish writer on several topics. He translated and wrote works in astronomy, alchemy and on mining. His most important work, De re metalica (1569), was on mining and metallurgy and drew extensively from previously published works in other language. He titled himself as "magnífico caballero" (= grand knight) but very little is known about him.

De Vargas was born in Madrid but grew up in the town of Coín (Málaga) where his father worked (possibly as a tax collector) in the service of the Marquis of Villena, who was also Lord of Monda and Tolox. He described himself as the son of Bernardo Pérez (or possibly Juan) de Vargas and Guiomar de Cárdenas (or Torres), both from Madrid and little else is known. His main work De re metalica (1569) included translations from and references to the work of Georgius Agricola (who wrote a De re Metallica in 1556). He also drew from De la pirotechnia (1540) by Vannoccio Biringuccio. About seven copies of his book are known and it was printed in Madrid by the French printer Pierres Cosin who opened the first printing press in Madrid in 1566 with the bookseller Alonso Gómez. The book was translated into French in the mid-18th century. De Vargas also wrote a book on chivalry in 1545 titled Los cuatro libros del valeroso Caballero D. Cirongilio de Tracia printed in Seville by Cromberger. (This book is mentioned in the satire of Cervantes' Don Quixote as being in the library of the innkeeper Palomeque.) In 1563 he wrote a book on astrology titled La Fabrica del Universo o Repertorio Perpetuo (="Factory of the Universe or Perpetual Repertoire") published by Juan de Ayala [Toledo].
