= Gnudi (surname) =

Gnudi is a surname. Notable people with the surname include:

- Martha Gnudi (1941–1976), American medical historian and translator
- Piero Gnudi (born 1938), Italian tax adviser, manager, and politician
- Cesare Gnudi (1910–1981), Italian art historian
