= Petrucci family =

Italian royal family

Petrucci
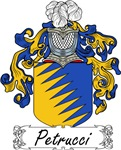
- Country: Republic of Siena
- Founded: mid 15th century
- Titles: Lord of Siena
- Dissolution: 1525 (exile of Fabio Petrucci)

The Petrucci Family was the ruling family of Siena in Italy from 1487 to 1525 during the Renaissance.

== History ==
The Petrucci family ruled the Italian city-state of Siena from 1487 to 1525. Pandolfo Petrucci was the first ruler and brought prosperity to Siena. Returning from exile, he seized many political offices until he became the first absolute ruler of Siena. Pandolfo had 3 sons, Borghese Petrucci, Alfonso Petrucci and Fabio Petrucci. After Pandolfo died in 1512, Borghese succeeded him, only to be ousted by his cousin, cardinal Raffaello, with the help of Pope Leo X. In the wake of more responsibilities from the Church, Raffaello ceded control of the city to his cousin, Francesco Petrucci. Francesco was exiled after a successful coup by Pandolfo's youngest son, Fabio Petrucci. Fabio was forced into exile by the Sienese people in 1525, marking the end of the Petrucci dynasty.

== Rulers ==
Name	Length of reign
Pandolfo	1487–1512
Borghese	1512–1516
Raffaello	1516–1522
Franceso	1522–1523
Fabio	1523–1525

== Family tree ==
Rulers of Siena in bold

Bartolomeo Petrucci
James Petrucci	**Pandolfo Petrucci**	Giacoppo Petrucci
**Francesco Petrucci**	**Borghese Petrucci**	Alfonso Petrucci	**Fabio Petrucci**	**Raffaello Petrucci**
