= Martha Gnudi =

American historian

Martha Teach Gnudi
- Born: 26 October 1908; Sycamore, Illinois
- Died: 30 April 1976 (aged 67)
- Education: University of Southern California (B.A.); University of Bologna (D.Litt.)
- Occupations: Medical historian and translator
- Spouse: Dante Gnudi
- Awards: Welch Medal

Martha Gnudi, née Teach (26 October 1908 – 30 April 1976) was an American medical historian and translator.

== Life and work ==
Martha Gnudi was born in Sycamore, Illinois, on 26 October 1908. She was awarded a B.A. cum laude in classics and history from the University of Southern California in 1929. Two years later Gnudi received a D.Litt. from the University of Bologna, the first woman to receive a degree from that institution. She married Dante Gnudi in 1933. She published, together with Jerome P. Webster, Documenti Inediti Intorno Alla Vita de Gaspare Tagliacozzi in 1935. From 1942 to 1963 she was librarian of the Webster Library of Plastic Surgery in the Columbia-Presbyterian Medical Center in New York City, then took charge of the historical and special collections of the Biomedical Library of the University of California at Los Angeles. In 1942, with Cyril Stanley Smith, she translated Vannoccio Biringuccio's 1540 De la pirotechnia, the first book published on metallurgy. She then wrote, together with Webster, The Life and Times of Gaspare Tagliacozzi (1545–1599), a pioneer in plastic and reconstructive surgery. She was awarded the Welch Medal of the American Association for the History of Medicine in 1954. From 1967 almost until her death, Gnudi translated Agostino Ramelli’s 1588 Le Diverse et Artificiose Machine. She completed the translation, but died on 30 April 1976, before publication.
