= De re metallica =

1556 book on mining and metallurgy by Georgius Agricola

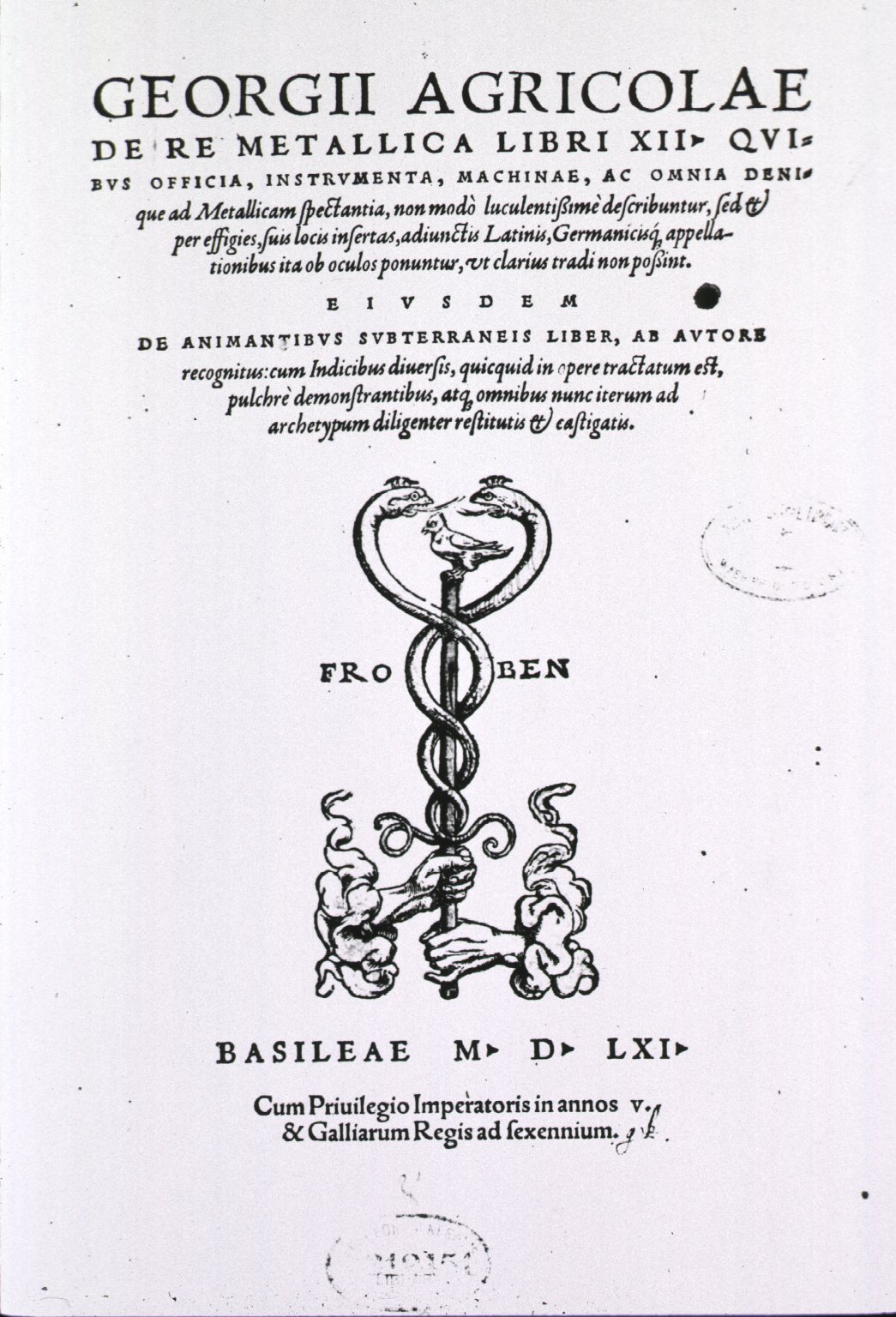
- Title page of 1561 edition
- Author: Georgius Agricola
- Translator: Herbert Hoover; Lou Henry Hoover
- Publication date: 1556
- English publication date: 1912
- ISBN: 0-486-60006-8
- OCLC: 34181557

De re metallica (Latin for On the Nature of Metals [Minerals]) is a book in Latin cataloguing the state of the art of mining, refining, and smelting metals, published a year posthumously in 1556 due to a delay in preparing woodcuts for the text. The author was Georg Bauer, whose pen name was the Latinized Georgius Agricola ("Bauer" and "Agricola" being respectively the German and Latin words for "farmer"). The book remained the authoritative text on mining for 180 years after its publication. It was also an important chemistry text for the period and is significant in the history of chemistry.

Mining was typically left to professionals, craftsmen and experts who were not eager to share the experiential knowledge they had accumulated over centuries; this knowledge was passed down orally within a small group of technicians and mining overseers. In the Middle Ages, these people held the same leading role as the master builders of the great cathedrals, or were perhaps like alchemists; a small, cosmopolitan elite within which knowledge was guarded from the outside world. Only a few writers found it worth the effort to write about mining, and only in the Renaissance did this begin to change. With improved transport and the invention of the printing press, knowledge spread much faster than before. In 1500, the first printed book dedicated to mining engineering, called the Nützlich Bergbüchleyn ("The Useful Little Mining Book") was published by Ulrich Rülein von Calw. The most important works in this genre, however, were the twelve books of De Re Metallica.

Agricola had spent nine years in the Bohemian town of Joachimsthal (now Jáchymov in the Czech Republic). After Joachimsthal, he spent the rest of his life in Chemnitz in Saxony, another prominent mining town in the Ore Mountains.

The book was greatly influential, and for more than a century after it was published, De Re Metallica remained a standard treatise used throughout Europe. The German mining technology it portrayed was acknowledged as the most advanced at the time, and the metallic wealth produced in German mining districts was the envy of many other European nations. The book was reprinted in a number of Latin editions, as well as in German and Italian translations. Publication in Latin meant that it could be read by any educated European of the time. The 292 superb woodcut illustrations and the detailed descriptions of machinery made it a practical reference for those wishing to replicate the latest in mining technology.

The drawings from which the woodcuts were made were done by an artist in Joachimsthal named Blasius Weffring, or Basilius Wefring. The woodcuts were then prepared in the Froben publishing house by Hans Rudolf Manuel Deutsch and Zacharias Specklin.

In 1912, the first English translation of De Re Metallica was privately published in London by subscription. The translators were married couple Herbert Hoover, a mining engineer (and later President of the United States), and Lou Henry Hoover, a geologist, Latinist and future First Lady of the United States as Herbert Hoover's wife. The translation is notable not only for its clarity of language, but for the extensive footnotes, which detail the classical references to mining and metals. Subsequent translations into other languages, including German, owe much to the Hoover translations, as their footnotes detail their difficulties with Agricola's invention of several hundred Latin expressions to cover Medieval German mining and milling terms that were unknown to classical Latin. The most important translation—outside English—was the one published by the Deutsches Museum in Munich.

== Summary ==
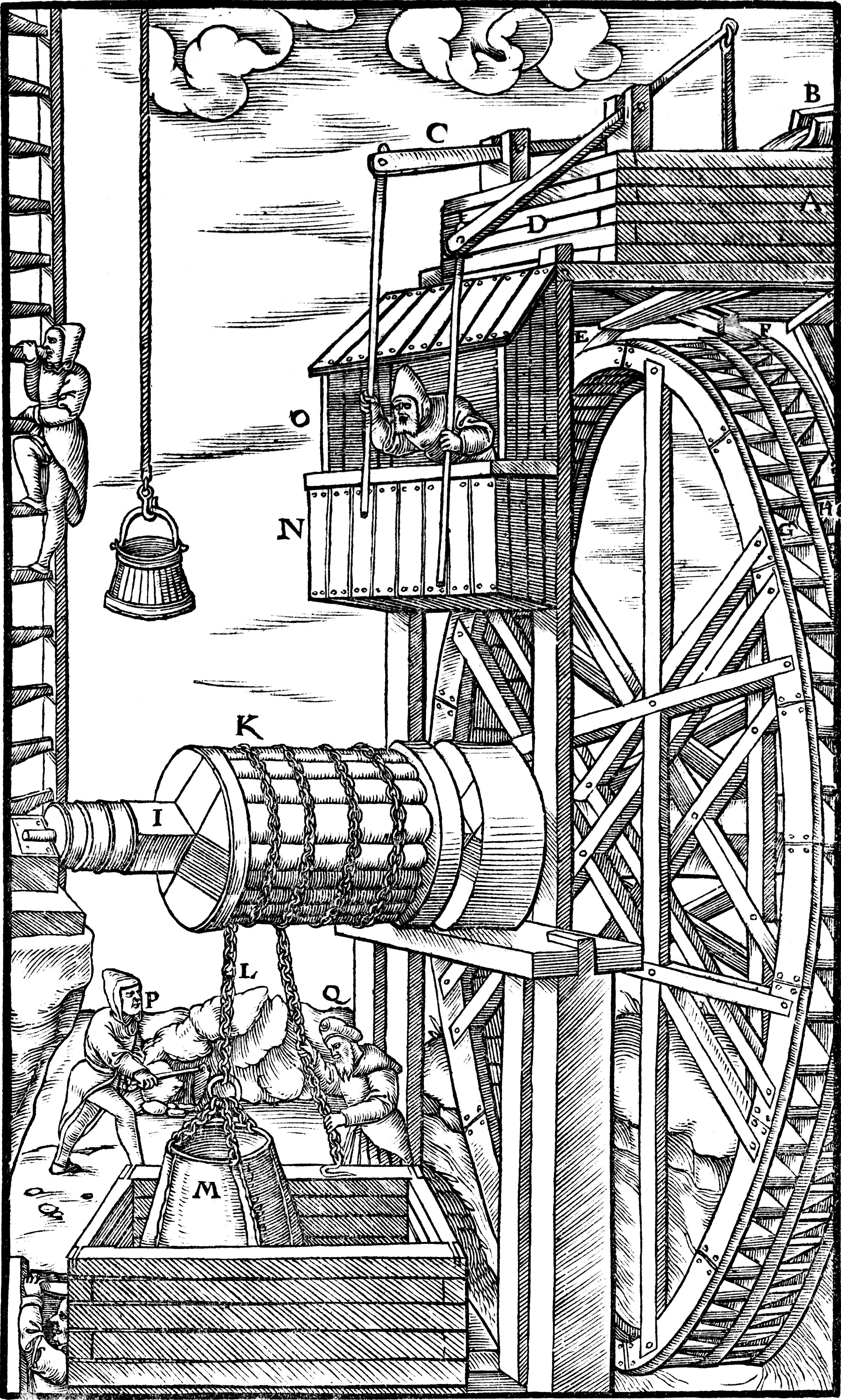
A water-powered mine hoist used for raising ore

The book consists of a preface and twelve chapters, labelled books I to XII, without titles. It also has numerous woodcuts that provide annotated diagrams illustrating equipment and processes described in the text.

=== Preface ===
Agricola addresses the book to prominent German aristocrats, the most important of whom were Maurice, Elector of Saxony and his brother Augustus, who were his main patrons. He then describes the works of ancient and contemporary writers on mining and metallurgy, the chief ancient source being Pliny the Elder. Agricola describes several books contemporary to him, the chief being a booklet by Calbus of Freiberg in German. The works of alchemists are then described. Agricola does not reject the idea of alchemy, but notes that alchemical writings are obscure and that we do not read of any of the masters who became rich. He then describes fraudulent alchemists, who deserve the death penalty. Agricola completes his introduction by explaining that, since no other author has described the art of metals completely, he has written this work, setting forth his scheme for twelve books. Finally, he again directly addresses his audience of German princes, explaining the wealth that can be gained from this art.

=== Book I: Arguments for and against this art ===
This book consists of the arguments used against the art and Agricola's counter arguments. He explains that mining and prospecting are not just a matter of luck and hard work; there is specialized knowledge that must be learned. A miner should have knowledge of philosophy, medicine, astronomy, surveying, arithmetic, architecture, drawing and law, though few are masters of the whole craft and most are specialists. This section is full of classical references and shows Agricola's classical education to its fullest. The arguments range from philosophical objections to gold and silver as being intrinsically worthless, to the danger of mining to its workers and its destruction of the areas in which it is carried out. He argues that without metals, no other activity such as architecture or agriculture are possible. The dangers to miners are dismissed, noting that most deaths and injuries are caused by carelessness, and other occupations are hazardous too. Clearing forests for timber is advantageous as the land can be farmed. Mines tend to be in mountains and gloomy valleys with little economic value. The loss of food from the forests destroyed can be replaced by purchase from profits, and metals have been placed underground by God and man is right to extract and use them. Finally, Agricola argues that mining is an honorable and profitable occupation.

=== Book II: The miner and a discourse on the finding of veins ===
This book describes the miner and the finding of veins. Agricola assumes that his audience is the mine owner, or an investor in mines. He advises owners to live at the mine and to appoint good deputies. It is recommended to buy shares in mines that have not started to produce as well as existing mines to balance the risks. The next section of this book recommends areas where miners should search. These are generally mountains with wood available for fuel and a good supply of water. A navigable river can be used to bring fuel, but only gold or gemstones can be mined if no fuel is available. The roads must be good and the area healthy. Agricola describes searching streams for metals and gems that have been washed from the veins. He also suggests looking for exposed veins and also describes the effects of metals on the overlying vegetation. He recommends trenching to investigate veins beneath the surface. He then describes dowsing with a forked twig although he rejects the method himself. The passage is the first written description of how dowsing is done. Finally he comments on the practice of naming veins or shafts.

=== Book III: Veins and stringers and seams in the rocks ===
This book is a description of the various types of veins that can be found. There are 30 illustrations of different forms of these veins, forming the majority of Book III. Agricola also describes a compass to determine the direction of veins and mentions that some writers claim that veins lying in certain directions are richer, although he provides counter-examples. He also mentions the theory that the sun draws the metals in veins to the surface, although he himself doubts this. Finally he explains that gold is not generated in the beds of streams and rivers and east-west streams are not more productive than others inherently. Gold occurs in streams because it is torn from veins by the water.

=== Book IV: Delimiting veins and the functions of mining officials ===
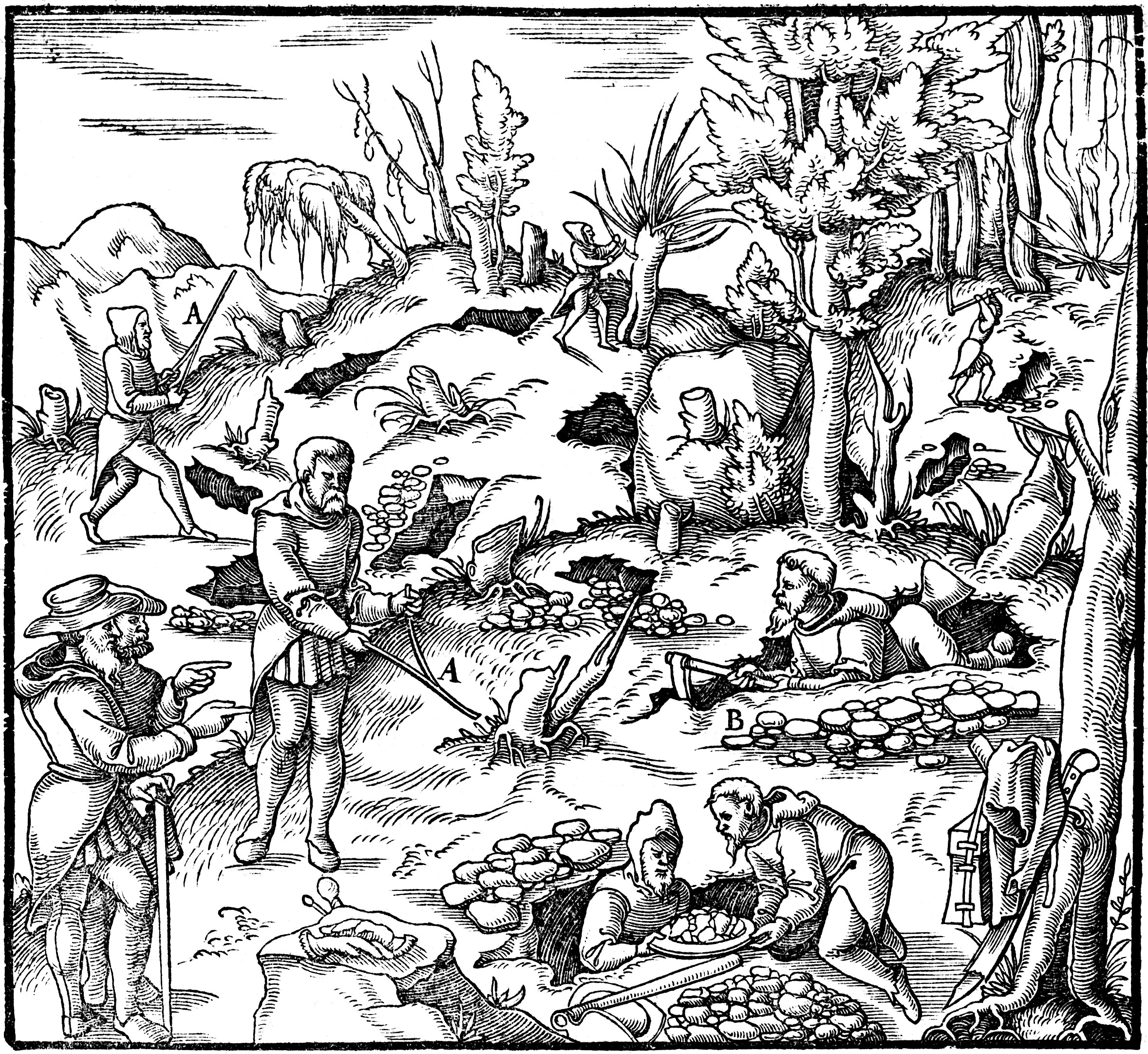
Prospecting, a woodcut from the book

This book describes how an official, the Bergmeister, is in charge of mining. He marks out the land into areas called meers when a vein is discovered. The rest of the book covers the laws of mining. There is a section on how the mine can be divided into shares. The roles of various other officials in regulating mines and taxing the production are stated. The shifts of the miners are fixed. The chief trades in the mine are listed and are regulated by both the Bergmeister and their foremen.

=== Book V: The digging of ore and the surveyor's art ===
This book covers underground mining and surveying. When a vein below ground is to be exploited a shaft is begun and a wooden shed with a windlass is placed above it. The tunnel dug at the bottom follows the vein and is just big enough for a man. The entire vein should be removed. Sometimes the tunnel eventually connects with a tunnel mouth in a hill side. Stringers and cross veins should be explored with cross tunnels or shafts when they occur. Agricola next describes that gold, silver, copper and mercury can be found as native metals, the others very rarely. Gold and silver ores are described in detail. Agricola then states that it is rarely worthwhile digging for other metals unless the ores are rich. Gems are found in some mines, but rarely have their own veins, lodestone is found in iron mines and emery in silver mines. Various minerals and colours of earths can be used to give indications of the presence of metal ores. The actual mineworking varies with the hardness of the rock, the softest is worked with a pick and requires shoring with wood, the hardest is usually broken with fire. Iron wedges, hammers and crowbars are used to break other rocks. Noxious gases and the ingress of water are described. Methods for lining tunnels and shafts with timber are described. The book concludes with a long treatise on surveying, showing the instruments required and techniques for determining the course of veins and tunnels. Surveyors allow veins to be followed, but also prevent mines removing ore from other claims and stop mine workings from breaking into other workings.

=== Book VI: The miners' tools and machines ===
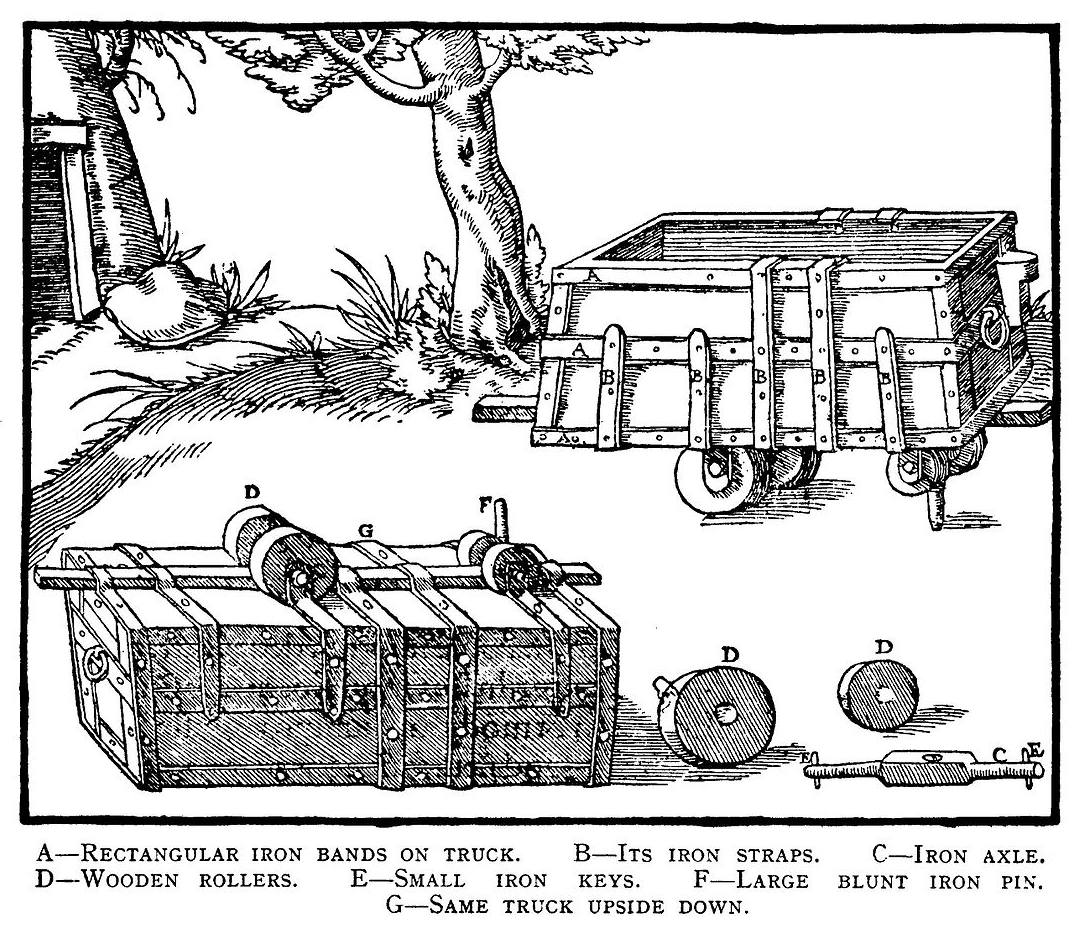
Minecart shown in De re metallica. The iron guide pin fits in a groove between two wooden planks. Railroads descended from minecarts.

This book is extensively illustrated and describes the tools and machinery associated with mining. Handtools and different sorts of buckets, wheelbarrows and trucks on wooded plankways are described. Packs for horses and sledges are used to carry loads above ground. Agricola then provides details of various kinds of machines for lifting weights. Some of these are man-powered and some powered by up to four horses or by waterwheels. Horizontal drive shafts along tunnels allow lifting in shafts not directly connected to the surface. If this is not possible, treadmills will be installed underground. Instead of lifting weights, similar machines use chains of buckets to lift water. Agricola also describes several designs of piston force pumps, which are either man or animal-powered, or powered by water wheels. Because these pumps can only lift water about 24 feet, batteries of pumps are required for the deepest mines. Water pipe designs are also covered in this section. Designs of wind scoop for ventilating shafts or forced air using fans or bellows are also described. Finally, ladders and lifts using wicker cages are used to get miners up and down shafts.

=== Book VII: On the assaying of ore ===
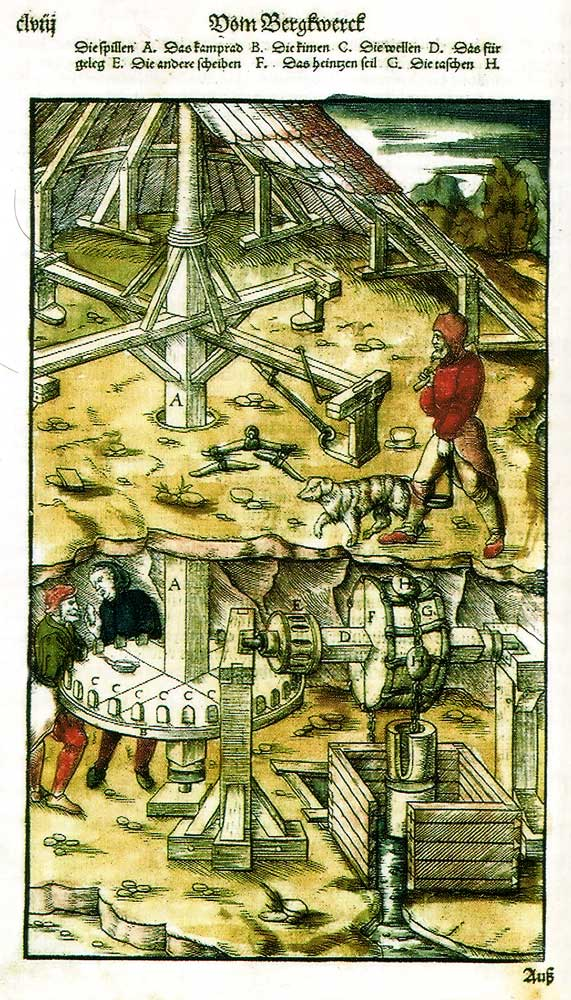
Underground chain pump, in a hand-colored woodcut illustration from Book VI of the German edition of 1557

This book deals with assaying techniques. Various designs of furnaces are detailed. Then cupellation, crucibles, scorifiers and muffle furnaces are described. The correct method of preparation of the cupels is covered in detail with beech ashes being preferred. Various other additives and formulae are described, but Agricola does not judge between them. Triangular crucibles and scorifiers are made of fatty clay with a temper of ground-up crucibles or bricks. Agricola then describes in detail which substances should be added as fluxes as well as lead for smelting or assaying. The choice is made by which colour the ore burns out which gives an indication of the metals present. The lead should be silver-free or be assayed separately. The prepared ore is wrapped in paper, placed on a scorifier and then placed under a muffle covered in burning charcoal in the furnace. The cupel should be heated at the same time. The scorifier is removed and the metal transferred to the cupel. Alternatively the ore can be smelted in a triangular crucible, and then have lead mixed with it when it is added to the cupel. The cupel is placed in the furnace and copper is separated into the lead which forms litharge in the cupel leaving the noble metal. Gold and silver are parted using an aqua which is probably nitric acid. Agricola describes precautions for ensuring the amount of lead is correct and also describes the amalgamation of gold with mercury. Assay techniques for base metals such as tin are described as well as techniques for alloys such as silver tin. The use of a touchstone to assay gold and silver is discussed. Finally detailed arithmetical examples show the calculations needed to give the yield from the assay.

=== Book VIII: Roasting, crushing and washing ore ===
In this book Agricola provides a detailed account of beneficiation of different ores. He describes the processes involved in ore sorting, roasting and crushing. The use of water for washing ores is discussed in great detail, e.g. the use of launders and washing tables. Several different types of machinery for crushing ore and washing it are illustrated and different techniques for different metals and different regions are described.

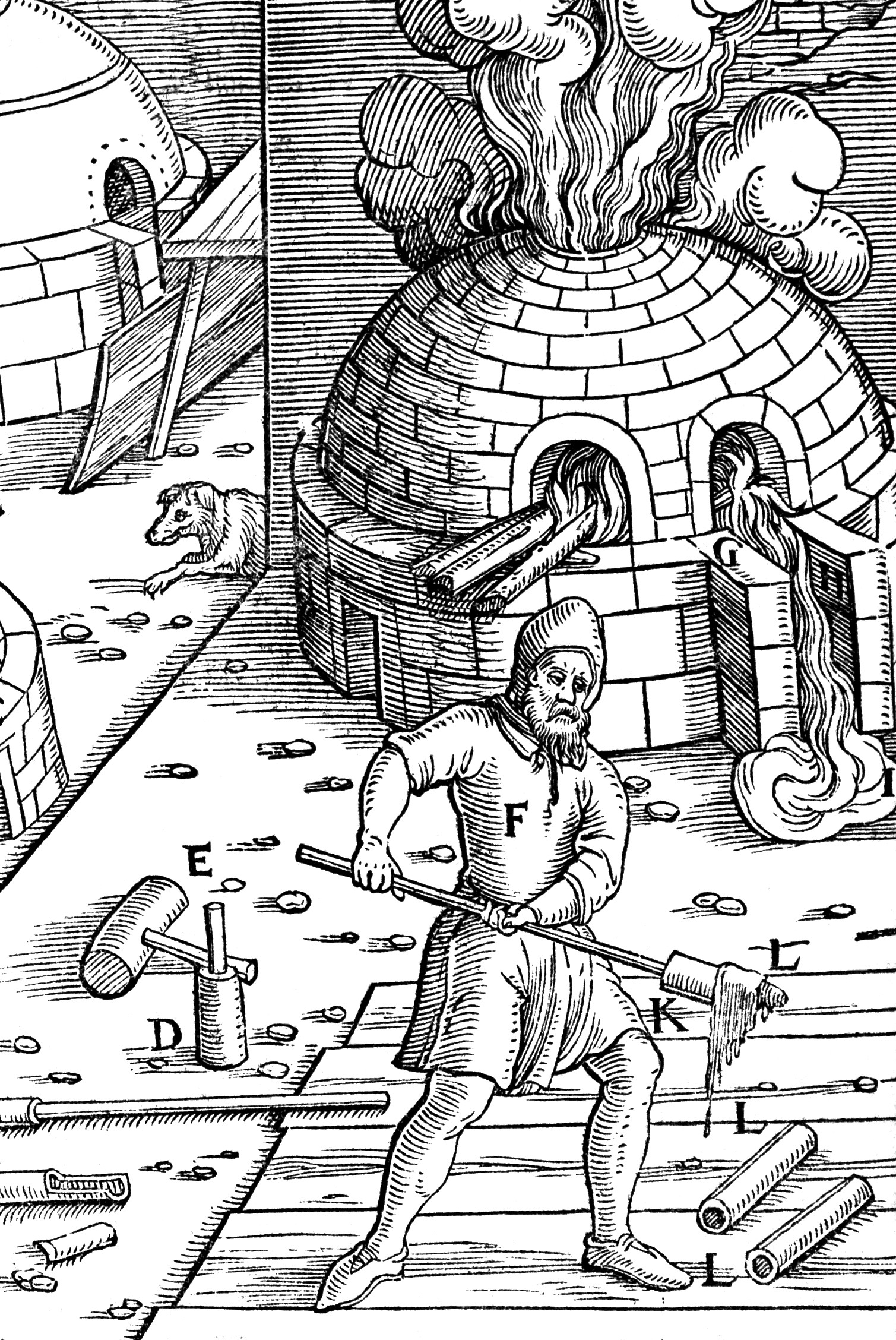
Smelting ore, a woodcut from the book

=== Book IX: Methods of smelting ores ===
This book describes smelting, which Agricola describes as perfecting the metal by fire. The design of furnaces is first explained. These are very similar for smelting different metals, constructed of brick or soft stone with a brick front and mechanically driven bellows at the rear. At the front is a pit called the fore-hearth to receive the metal. The furnace is charged with beneficiated ore and crushed charcoal and lit. In some gold and silver smelting a lot of slag is produced because of the relative poverty of the ore and the tap hole has to be opened at various times to remove different slag materials. When the furnace is ready, the forehearth is filled with molten lead into which the furnace is tapped. In other furnaces the smelting can be continuous, and lead is placed into the furnace if there is none in the ore. The slag is skimmed off the top of the metal as it is tapped. The lead containing the gold is separated by cupellation, the metal rich slags are re-smelted. Other smelting processes are similar, but lead is not added. Agricola also describes making crucible steel and distilling mercury and bismuth in this book.

=== Book X: Separating silver from gold and lead from gold or silver ===
Agricola describes parting silver from gold in this book by using acids. He also describes heating with antimony sulphide (stibium), which would give silver sulphide and a mixture of gold and antimony. The gold and silver can then be recovered with cupellation. Gold can also be parted using salts or using mercury. Large scale cupellation using a cupellation hearth is also covered in this book.

=== Book XI: Separating silver from copper ===
This book describes separating silver from copper or iron. This is achieved by adding large amounts of lead at a temperature just above the melting point of lead. The lead will liquate out with the silver. This process will need to be repeated several times. The lead and silver can be separated by cupellation.

=== Book XII: Manufacturing salt, soda, alum, vitriol, sulphur, bitumen, and glass ===
This describes the preparation of what Agricola calls "juices": salt, soda, nitre, alum, vitriol, saltpetre, sulphur and bitumen. Finally glass making is covered. Agricola seems less secure about this process. He is not clear about making glass from the raw ingredients but clearer about remelting glass to make objects.

Prof. Philippus Bechius (1521–1560), a friend of Agricola, translated De re metallica libri XII into German. It was published with the German title Vom Bergkwerck XII Bücher in 1557. Herbert Hoover and Lou Henry Hoover describe the translation as "a wretched work, by one who knew nothing of the science," but it, like the Latin original, saw further editions. In 1563 Agricola's publisher, Froben and Bischoff ("Hieronimo Frobenio et Nicolao Episcopio") in Basel, published an Italian translation by Michelangelo Florio as well.

== Publication history ==
Although Agricola died in 1555, the publication was delayed until the completion of the extensive and detailed woodcuts one year after his death.

A German translation was published in 1557 and a second Latin edition appeared in 1561. A version in Spanish, though not a mere translation, was produced by Bernardo Pérez de Vargas in 1569. This was translated into French as Traité singulier de metallique in 1743.

In 1912, the first English translation of De Re Metallica was privately published in London by subscription. The translators and editors were Herbert Hoover, a mining engineer (and later President of the United States), and his wife, Lou Henry Hoover, a geologist and Latinist. The translation is notable not only for its clarity of language, but for the extensive footnotes, which detail the classical references to mining and metals, such as the Naturalis Historia of Pliny the Elder, the history of mining law in England, France, and the German states; safety in mines, including historical safety; and known minerals at the time that Agricola wrote De Re Metallica. No expense was spared for this edition: in its typography, fine paper and binding, quality of reproduced images, and vellum covers, the publisher attempted to match the extraordinarily high standards of the sixteenth-century original. As a consequence, copies of this 1912 edition are now both rare and valuable. Fortunately, the translation has been reprinted by Dover Books.

Subsequent translations into other languages, including German, owe much to the Hoover translations, as their footnotes detail their difficulties with Agricola's invention of several hundred Latin expressions to cover Medieval German mining and milling terms unknown to classical Latin.

== Editions ==
- Agricola, Georg. De re metallica. 1st ed. Basil: Hieronymus Froben & Nicolaus Episcopius, 1556.
- Agricola, Georg. Vom Bergkwerck. Translated by Philipp Bech. Basel: Hieronymus Froben & Nicolaus Episcopius, 1557.
- Agricola, Georg. De re metallica. 2nd ed. Basil: Hieronymus Froben & Nicolaus Episcopius, 1561.
- Agricola, Georg. Opera di Giorgio Agricola de L'Arte de Metalli. Basil: Hieronymus Froben & Nicolaus Episcopius, 1563.
- Agricola, Georg. De re metallica. Basil: Ludwig König, 1621.
- Agricola, Georg. Bergwerck Buch. Translated by Philipp Bech. Basil: Ludwig König, 1621.
- Agricola, Georg. De Re Metallica. Basil: Emanuel König, 1657.
- Agricola, Georg. De Re Metallica. Translated by Herbert Clark Hoover and Lou Henry Hoover. 1st English ed. London: The Mining Magazine, 1912.
- Agricola, Georg. Zwölf Bücher vom Berg- und Hüttenwesen. Edited by Carl Schiffner and others. Translated by Carl Schiffner. Berlin: VDI-Verlag, 1928.
- Agricola, Georg. De Re Metallica. Translated by Herbert Clark Hoover and Lou Henry Hoover. New York: Dover Publications, 1950. Reprint of the 1912 edition.
- Agricola, Georg. De Re Metallica. Translated by Herbert Clark Hoover and Lou Henry Hoover. New York: Dover Publications, 1986. Reprint of the 1950 reprint of the 1912 edition.

== See also ==
- De la pirotechnia
- Naturalis Historia
- Pliny the Elder
- Scientific literature
- Theophrastus
