= Jerome Pierce Webster =

American plastic surgeon (1888–1974)

- Born: August 2, 1888; Ashland, New Hampshire, United States
- Died: November 14, 1974 (aged 86); Riverdale, Bronx, New York City, United States
- Education: Trinity College (Connecticut) (BA); Johns Hopkins School of Medicine (MD)
- Occupations: plastic surgeon, professor of clinical surgery, medical historian
- Employer(s): NewYork-Presbyterian Hospital; Columbia University Vagelos College of Physicians and Surgeons

Jerome Pierce Webster (August 2, 1888, Ashland, New Hampshire – November 14, 1974, Riverdale, Bronx, New York City) was an American plastic surgeon, professor of clinical surgery, historian of medicine, and collector of books and manuscripts on surgery. He is sometimes called "the founder of plastic surgery education in the United States."

== Education and WWI service ==
Jerome Pierce Webster, youngest of three siblings, graduated in 1906 from Holderness Boys School, where his father, Reverend Lorin Webster (1857–1923), was headmaster. J. P. Webster then matriculated at Hartford's Trinity College, where he graduated in 1910 with a B.A. He then studied medicine at Johns Hopkins Medical School, graduating with an M.D. in 1914. At Johns Hopkins, he was greatly influenced by William Stewart Halsted. Webster was appointed in 1914 a surgical intern and assistant resident in surgery under John Miller Turpin Finney at the Johns Hopkins Hospital. In July 1916 Webster took a leave of absence to go to Berlin as a special assistant to James W. Gerard, the American Ambassador to Germany, to inspect medical conditions at prisoner-of-war camps in Germany. For this work as an inspector, Webster was honored by the British government. When the USA entered WW I in April 1917, he joined the United States Army Medical Corps as an officer assigned to the 30th Engineer Regiment (Gas and Flame) — which in July 1918 was renamed the 1st Gas Regiment. He saw action on three fronts in France and won the Croix de Guerre with Gold Star.

== Career after WWI ==
After the end of WW I, Webster returned to his surgical training at the Johns Hopkins Hospital and completed his surgical residency in 1921. He went to China, at the invitation of the surgeon Adrian Stevenson Taylor (1883–1962), as the first surgical resident of the Peking Union Medical College. There Webster practiced surgery and taught from 1921 to 1926, attaining in 1925 the academic rank of associate professor of surgery. In August 1922, J. P. Webster's father (an Episcopalian priest) and mother went to the Peking Union Medical College, where Reverend Webster had an appointment as a professor of English. However, Reverend Webster died in July 1923 in Beijing.

From 1926 to 1927 Jerome P. Webster worked in London with Harold Delf Gillies and learned about Gillies's 'tubed pedicle' flap technique used in facial reconstruction. In 1927 Webster returned to the US to work in St. Louis under the direction of Vilray Papin Blair (1871–1955), the author the 1912 treatise Surgery and Diseases of the Mouth and Jaw. After 8 months of work under Blair, Webster accepted in 1928, with an invitation from the surgeon Allen Whipple, a position at New York-Presbyterian Hospital. There Webster practiced surgery from 1928 to 1954, becoming a consultant in 1954. From 1928 to 1954 he was in charge of the plastic surgery service of the Vanderbilt Clinic managed by the Columbia University College of Physicians and Surgeons. There he held an appointment in surgery as an associate from 1931 to 1935, an assistant professor from 1935 to 1948, and a full professor from 1948 to 1954, when he retired as professor emeritus. He developed the plastic surgery service of the Columbia University College of Physicians and Surgeons into one of the world's best, serving over 60,000 patients and contributing important research. Webster's program for Plastic Surgery Residency at New York-Presbyterian Hospital trained more than 40 surgeons, many of whom went on to establish outstanding reputations in plastic surgery. One such former resident was Webster's successor, George Francis Crikelair (1920–2005), who directed the plastic surgery service at Columbia from 1959 to 1971.

Webster focused on reconstructive, rather than cosmetic, plastic surgery. In 1937 he was one of 11 founding members of the American Board of Plastic Surgery. From 1941 to 1942 he was the president of the American Association of Plastic Surgeons. During WW II, he directed, with the aid of 75 instructors, a series of courses in plastic surgery for the instruction of U.S. Army medical and dental officers. From 1944 to 1946, with Robert H. Ivy, he inspected in the USA the 9 plastic surgery centers run by the U.S. Army.

== Historian of surgery and collector of medical books ==
Webster accumulated his own collection of rare books and papers on the history of medicine related to plastic surgery. The collection contains 5000 books, 40,000 reprints, and thousands of case reports and photographs. Webster's library was started to aid his research on the Italian surgeon, Gaspare Tagliacozzi (1545–1599). Webster regarded Tagliacozzi as the Renaissance "father of plastic surgery". In retirement, Webster concentrated on developing his library on plastic surgery. When he died, his will bestowed Columbia University with the entire collection — now called the "Jerome P. Library of Plastic Surgery".

== Awards and honors ==
In addition to his WW I honors from France and the UK, Webster during WW II was decorated twice by the Greek government and three times by the Republic of China. In 1952 he was made an honorary doctor of medicine by the University of Bologna. In 1954 the American Association for the History of Medicine awarded the William H. Welch Medal to him and Martha Teach Gnudi for their co-authorship of the 1950 biography “The Life and Times of Gaspare Tagliacozzi, Surgeon of Bologna, 1545–1599. He received the 1972 Honorary Award from the American Society of Plastic Surgeons and in 1973 the Academy Plaque from the New York Academy of Medicine.

== Club memberships ==
Webster joined the Grolier Club in 1935 and the Century Association in 1936. As a member of the Charaka Club, he read in January 1952 at a club meeting his paper entitled The story of a plastic surgery library. A member of both the Riverdale Yacht Club and the Saint Andrew's Golf Club, he was an avid golfer, especially during his retirement.

== Personal life ==
In July 1934 J. P. Webster married Geraldine Rockefeller McAlpin (1900–1938). She died giving birth to twin sons, both of whom survived. Her mother was Emma Rockefeller McAlpin (1868–1934), a daughter of William Avery Rockefeller Jr. (1841–1922). In 1951 J. P. Webster married his second wife Emily Brune Randall (1890–1965). Upon his death in 1974 he was survived by three children (a daughter Geraldine and twin sons, Jerome Pierce Webster Jr. and G. Hartley D. Webster) from his first marriage and 11 grandchildren. Geraldine Webster Dellenback and her husband Robert J. Dellenback supported many philanthropic organizations, such as the National Museum of Wildlife Art, the American Prairie Reserve, and the Papers Project at the Buffalo Bill Museum of the West. Jerome P. Webster Sr. is buried in Sleepy Hollow Cemetery, where both of his wives and many members of the Rockefeller family are buried.

== Selected publications ==
- Webster, J. P. (1924). "A new instrument and operation for aseptic end-to-end intestinal anastomosis". Experimental Biology and Medicine. 21 (8): 579–581. doi:10.3181/00379727-21-290. S2CID 84856825.
- Webster, J. P. (1924). "Healing of aseptic end-to-end intestinal anastomoses by the author's method". Experimental Biology and Medicine. 21 (8): 581–583. doi:10.3181/00379727-21-291. S2CID 87145048.
- Webster, J. P. (1925). "Aseptic End-To-End Intestinal Anastomosis". Annals of Surgery. 81 (3): 646–669. doi:10.1097/00000658-192503010-00011. PMC 1399962. PMID 17865223.
- Webster, J. P. (1925). "Reels for ligature silk". Chinese Medical Journal. 39 (9): 804–806. doi:10.3760/cma.j.issn.0366-6999.1925.09.106 (inactive 12 July 2025).
- Webster, J. P. (1944). "Refrigerated Skin Grafts". Annals of Surgery. 120 (4): 431–448. doi:10.1097/00000658-194410000-00002. PMC 1618199. PMID 17858501.
- Webster, Jerome P. (June 1946). "Cutaneous Cancer from the Surgeon's Point of View". Archives of Dermatology. 53 (6): 573–575. doi:10.1001/archderm.1946.01510350013003. PMID 20987141.
- McDonald, Joseph J.; Webster, J. P. (July 1946). "Early covering of extensive traumatic deformities". Plastic and Reconstructive Surgery. 1 (1): 49–57. doi:10.1097/00006534-194607000-00006. PMID 20994786.
- Webster, J. P. (September 1946). "Mastectomy for Gynecomastia Through a Semicircular Intra-areolar Incision". Annals of Surgery. 124 (3): 557–575. doi:10.1097/00000658-194609000-00011. PMC 1803097. PMID 17858862.
- Webster, J. P.; Deming, Edward G. (1950). "The surgical treatment of the bifid nose". Plastic and Reconstructive Surgery. 6 (1): 1–37. doi:10.1097/00006534-195007000-00001. PMID 15430171. S2CID 477672.
- Crawford, John K.; Webster, J. P. (1952). "Congenital dermoid cysts of the nose". Plastic and Reconstructive Surgery. 9 (3): 235–260. doi:10.1097/00006534-195203000-00004. PMID 14911372. S2CID 30433352.
- Webster, J. P. (1955). "Crescentic peri-alar cheek excision for upper lip flap advancement with a short history of upper lip repair". Plastic and Reconstructive Surgery. 16 (6): 434–464. doi:10.1097/00006534-195512000-00003. PMID 13280381. S2CID 3842760.
- Webster, J. P. (1956). "The problem of reconstruction in potential persistent malignancy: a foresight saga". British Journal of Plastic Surgery. 9 (4): 289–303. doi:10.1016/S0007-1226(56)80053-2. PMID 13396194.
- Webster, J. P. (1968). "Some Portrayals of Gaspard Tagliacozzi". Plastic and Reconstructive Surgery. 41 (5): 411–426. doi:10.1097/00006534-196805000-00001. PMID 4870985. S2CID 32396316.
- Webster, Jerome P. (1969). "Gaspare Tagliacozzi— Plastic Surgeon". JAMA: The Journal of the American Medical Association. 208 (7): 1191. doi:10.1001/jama.1969.03160070069026. PMID 4889610.; editorial mentioned by Webster: "Gaspare Tagliacozzi, (1545-1599) plastic surgeon". JAMA. 207 (7): 1343–1344. February 17, 1969. doi:10.1001/jama.1969.03150200109016. PMID 4885412.
