= Petruccio (disambiguation) =

Petruccio is the primary male character in William Shakespeare's The Taming of the Shrew.

Petruccio or Petruchio may also refer to:

== People ==
- Petruccio Ubaldini (16th century), Italian calligraphist and illuminator
- Petruccio de Migliolo (died 1486), a Roman Catholic prelate
- Pietro Montanini (1619–1689), also called Petruccio Perugino, an Italian painter of the Baroque period
- Pietro Farnese, also called Petruccio di Cola (c. 1310–1363), an Italian military leader
- Petrúcio Ferreira dos Santos (born 1996), a Paralympic sprinter from Brazil

== Other uses ==
- Petruccio, opera by Alick Maclean (1872–1936)
- Petruccio, character in Palatsi (opera) by Aulis Sallinen (1995)
- Petruccio, character in The Queen and Concubine, a play published in 1659
- Petruchio (Romeo and Juliet), unseen character in William Shakespeare's Romeo and Juliet

== See also ==
- Petrucci (disambiguation)
