= Georgius Agricola =

German scholar, mineralogist and metallurgist (1494–1555)

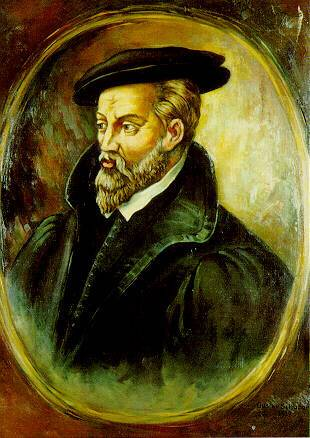
- Georgius Agricola (fictive 1927 portrait)
- Born: Georg Bauer; 24 March 1494; Glauchau, Electorate of Saxony, Holy Roman Empire
- Died: 21 November 1555 (aged 61); Chemnitz, Electorate of Saxony, Holy Roman Empire
- Education: Leipzig University
- Scientific career
- Fields: Mineralogy
- Workplaces: School of Zwickau

Georgius Agricola (/əˈɡrɪkələ/; born Georg Bauer; 24 March 1494 – 21 November 1555) was a German Renaissance humanist scholar, mineralogist and metallurgist. Born in the small town of Glauchau, in the Electorate of Saxony of the Holy Roman Empire, he was broadly educated, but took a particular interest in the mining and refining of metals. He was the first to drop the Arabic definite article al-, exclusively writing chymia and chymista in describing activity that we today would characterize as chemical or alchemical, giving chemistry its modern name. For his groundbreaking work De Natura Fossilium published in 1546, he is generally referred to as the father of mineralogy and the founder of geology as a scientific discipline.

He is well known for his pioneering work De re metallica libri XII, that was published in 1556, one year after his death. This 12-chapter work is a comprehensive and systematic study, classification and methodical guide on all available factual and practical aspects that are of concern for mining, the mining sciences and metallurgy, investigated and researched in its natural environment by means of direct observation. Unrivalled in its complexity and accuracy, it served as the standard reference work for two centuries. Agricola stated in the preface that he will exclude "all those things which I have not myself seen, or have not read or heard of". He continued, "That which I have neither seen, nor carefully considered after reading or hearing of, I have not written about."

As a scholar of the Renaissance, he was committed to a universal approach towards learning and research. He published over 40 complete scholarly works during his professional life on a wide range of subjects and disciplines, such as pedagogy, medicine, metrology, mercantilism, pharmacy, philosophy, geology, history, and many more. His innovative and comprehensive scholarly work, based on new and precise methods of production and control, has made his work a central part of scholarship and understanding of science during that period.

== Etymology ==
He is often, although not universally, referred to as "the Father of mineralogy" and the founder of geology as a scientific discipline. Poet Georg Fabricius has bestowed a brief honorary title on him in recognition of his legacy that his fellow Saxons cite regularly: die ausgezeichnete Zierde des Vaterlandes, (literally: the distinguished ornament of the Fatherland). He was baptized with his birth name Georg Pawer. Pawer is a vernacular form of the modern German term Bauer, which translates to farmer in English. His teacher, the Leipzig professor Petrus Mosellanus convinced him to consider the common practice of name latinisation, particularly popular among Renaissance scholars, so "Georg Pawer" became "Georgius Agricola". Coincidentally, the name Georg/Georgius derives from Greek and also means "farmer".

== Early life ==
=== Youth ===
Agricola was born in 1494 as Georg Pawer, the second of seven children of a clothier and dyer in Glauchau. At the age of twelve he enrolled in the Latin school in Chemnitz or Zwickau. From 1514 to 1518 he studied at the Leipzig University where, under the name Georgius Pawer de Glauchaw, he first subscribed in the summer semester to theology, philosophy, philology under rector Nikolaus Apel, and to ancient languages, Greek and Latin in particular. He received his first Latin lectures under Petrus Mosellanus, a celebrated humanist of the time and adherent of Erasmus of Rotterdam.

=== Humanist education ===
Gifted with a precocious intellect and his freshly acquired title of baccalaureus artium, Agricola early threw himself into the pursuit of the "new learning", with such effect that at the age of 24 he was appointed rector extraordinarius of the Greek School of Zwickau (1519–22), part of the unified (Greek and Latin) School of Zwickau (Zwickauer Ratsschule) after 1520.

In 1520 he published his first book, a Latin grammar manual with practical and methodical hints for teachers. In 1522 he ended his appointment to again study at Leipzig for another year, where, as rector, he was supported by his former tutor and professor of classics, Peter Mosellanus, with whom he had always been in correspondence. He also subscribed to the studies of medicine, physics, and chemistry.

In 1523 he traveled to Italy and enrolled in the University of Bologna and probably Padua and completed his studies in medicine. It remains unclear where he acquired his diploma. In 1524 he joined the Aldine Press, a prestigious printing office in Venice that was established by Aldus Manutius, who had died in 1515. Manutius had established and maintained contacts and the friendship in a network among the many scholars, including the most celebrated, from all over Europe, whom he had encouraged to come to Venice and take care of the redaction of the numerous publications of the classics of antiquity. At the time of Agricola's visit, the business was run by Andrea Torresano and his daughter Maria. Agricola participated in the edition of a work in several volumes on Galen until 1526.

== Professional life ==
=== Town physician and pharmacist ===
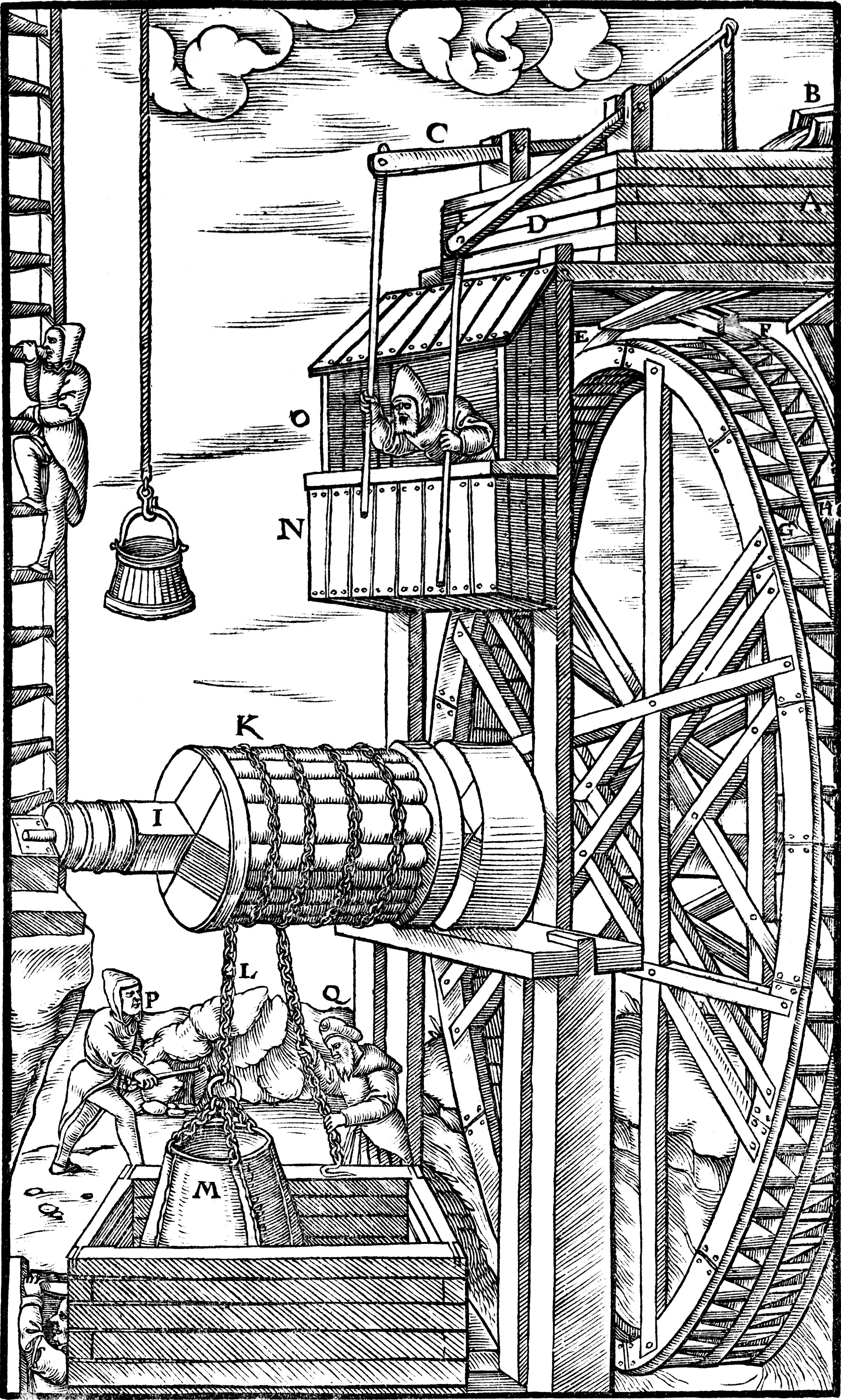
A water mill used for raising ore

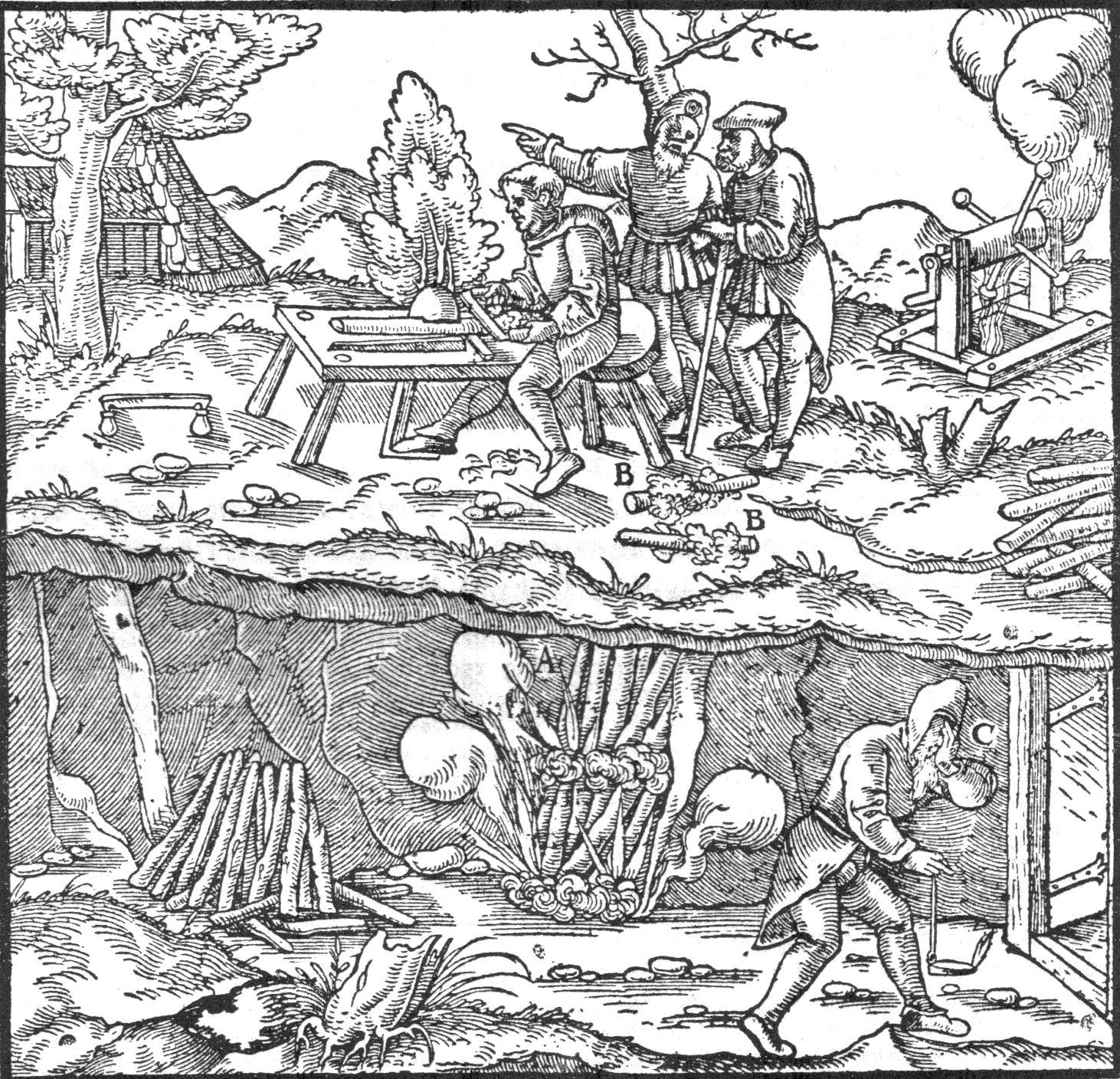
Fire-setting underground

Agricola returned to Zwickau in 1527 and to Chemnitz in autumn of the same year, where he married Anna Meyner, a widow from Schneeberg. Upon his search for employment as town physician and pharmacist in the Ore Mountains, preferably a place where he could satisfy his ardent longings for the studies on mining, he settled in the suitable little town Joachimsthal in the Bohemian Erzgebirge, where in 1516 significant silver ore deposits were found. The 15,000 inhabitants made Joachimsthal a busy, booming centre of mining and smelting works with hundreds of shafts for Agricola to investigate.

His primary post proved to be not very demanding and he lent all his spare time to his studies. Beginning in 1528 he immersed himself in comparisons and tests on what had been written about mineralogy and mining and his own observations of the local materials and the methods of their treatment. He constructed a logical system of the local conditions, rocks and sediments, the minerals and ores, explained the various terms of general and specific local territorial features. He combined this discourse on all natural aspects with a treatise on the actual mining, the methods and processes, local extraction variants, the differences and oddities he had learnt from the miners. For the first time, he tackled questions on the formation of ores and minerals, attempted to bring the underlying mechanisms to light, and introduced his conclusions in a systematic framework. He laid out the whole process in a scholarly dialogue and published it under the title Bermannus, sive de re metallica dialogus, (Bermannus, or a dialogue on metallurgy) in 1530. The work was highly praised by Erasmus for the attempt to put the knowledge, won by practical inquiry, into order and further investigate in reduced form. Agricola, in his capacity of physician, also suggested that minerals and their effects on and relationship to human medicine should be a future subject of investigation.

In 1531 Christian Egenolff in Frankfurt published his German book named Rechter Gebrauch d'Alchimei, mitt vil bissher verborgenen, nutzbaren unnd lustigen Künsten, nit allein den fürwitzigen Alchimismisten, sonder allen kunstbaren Werckleutten, in und ausserhalb Feurs. Auch sunst aller menglichen inn vil wege zugebrauchen (The Proper Use of Alchemy) which argued that true "alchemy" should not attempt transmutation of metals to gold or synthesizing the philosopher's stone, but rather study and develop the industrial methods of skilled craftsmen.

=== Mayor of Chemnitz ===
In the same year, Agricola received an offer of the city of Kepmnicz (Chemnitz) for the position of Stadtleybarzt (town physician), which he accepted and subsequently relocated to Chemnitz in 1533. Although little is known about his work as physician, Agricola entered his most productive years at this time and soon became lord mayor of Chemnitz. He also served as diplomat and historiographer for Duke George, who was looking to uncover possible territorial claims and commissioned Agricola with a large historical work, the Dominatores Saxonici a prima origine ad hanc aetatem (Lords of Saxony from the beginning to the present time), which took 20 years to accomplish and was only published in 1555 at Freiberg.

In his work De Mensuris et ponderibus, published in 1533, he described the systems of Greek and Roman measures and weights. In the 16th century Holy Roman Empire there were no uniform dimensions, measures, and weights, which impeded trade and commerce. This work laid the foundation for Agricola's reputation as a humanist scholar; as he committed himself to the introduction of standardized weights and measures, he entered the public stage and occupied a political position. In 1552 Guillaume Philandrier provided a commentary on the work.

In 1544, he published the De ortu et causis subterraneorum (On Subterranean Origins and Causes), in which he criticized older theories and laid out the foundations of modern physical geology. It discusses the effect of wind and water as powerful geological forces, the origin and distribution of ground water and mineralizing fluids, the origin of subterranean heat, the origin of ore channels, and the principal divisions of the mineral kingdom. However, he maintained that a certain 'materia pinguis' or 'fatty matter,' set into fermentation by heat, gave birth to fossil organic shapes, as opposed to fossil shells having belonged to living animals.

In 1546, he published the four volumes of De natura eorum quae effluunt e terra (The nature of the things that flow out of the earth's interior). It deals with the properties of water, its effects, taste, smell, temperature etc. and air under the earth, which, as Agricola reasoned, is responsible for earthquakes and volcanoes.

The ten books of De veteribus et novis metallis, more commonly known as De Natura Fossilium were published in 1546 as a comprehensive textbook and account of the discovery and occurrence of minerals, ores, metals, gemstones, earths and igneous rocks, followed by De animantibus subterraneis in 1548, and a number of smaller works on the metals during the following two years. Agricola served as Burgomaster (lord mayor) of Chemnitz in 1546, 1547, 1551, and 1553.

== De re metallica ==
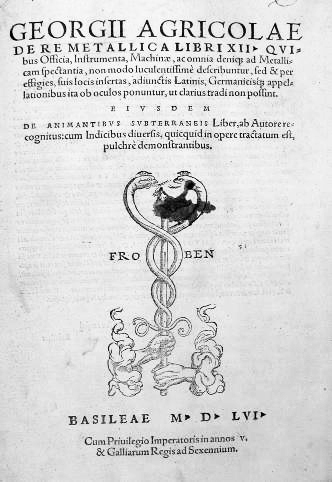
De re metallica

Agricola's most famous work, the De re metallica libri xii, was published in 1556, the year after his death; it was perhaps finished in 1550, since the dedication to the elector and his brother is dated to that year. The delay is thought to be due to the book's many woodcuts. The work is a systematic, illustrated treatise on mining and extractive metallurgy. It shows processes to extract ores from the ground, and metals from ore.

Until that time, Pliny the Elder's work Historia Naturalis was the main source of information on metals and mining techniques. Agricola acknowledged his debt to ancient authors, such as Pliny and Theophrastus, and made numerous references to Roman works. In geology, Agricola described and illustrated how ore veins occur in and on the ground. He described prospecting for ore veins and surveying in detail, as well as washing the ores to collect the heavier valuable minerals, such as gold and tin. The work shows water mills used in mining, and the machine for lifting men and material into and out of a mine shaft. Water mills found application especially in crushing ores to release the fine particles of gold and other heavy minerals, as well as working giant bellows to force air into the confined spaces of underground workings.

Agricola described mining methods which are now obsolete, such as fire-setting, which involved building fires against hard rock faces. The hot rock was quenched with water, and the thermal shock weakened it enough for easy removal. It was a dangerous method when used underground, and was made redundant by explosives.

The work contains, in an appendix, the German equivalents for the technical terms used in the Latin text. Modern words that derive from the work include fluorspar (from which was later named fluorine) and bismuth. In another example, believing the black rock of the Schloßberg at Stolpen to be the same as Pliny the Elder's basalt, Agricola applied this name to it, and thus originated a petrological term.

In 1912, the Mining Magazine (London) published an English translation of De re metallica. The translation was made by Herbert Hoover, the American mining engineer, and his wife Lou Henry Hoover. Herbert Hoover was later President of the United States.

== Death and legacy ==
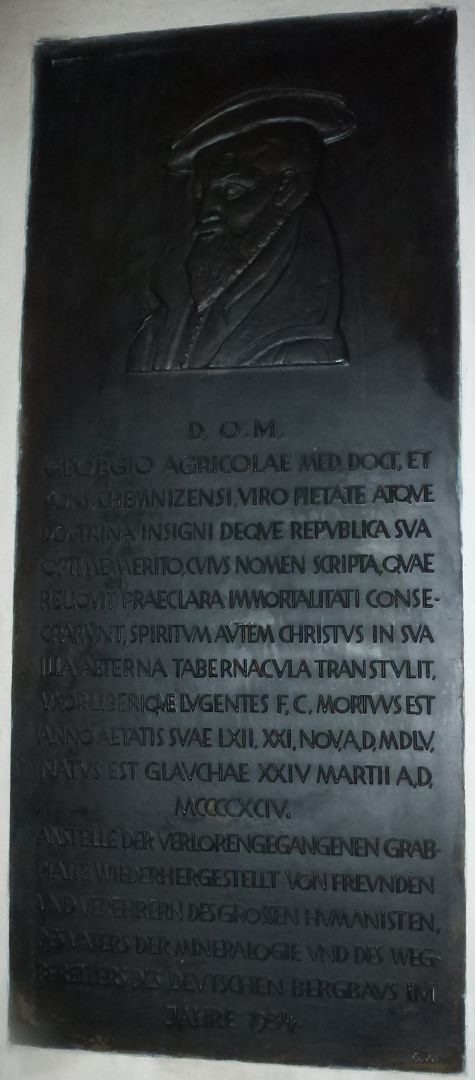
Memorial tablet for Agricola at Zeitz cathedral, installed in June 2014

Agricola died on 21 November 1555. His lifelong friend, the Protestant poet and classicist Georg Fabricius, wrote in a letter to the Protestant theologian Phillip Melanchthon, "He who since the days of childhood had enjoyed robust health was carried off by a four-days' fever." Agricola was a fervent Catholic, who, according to Fabricius, "despised our Churches" and "would not tolerate with patience that anyone should discuss ecclesiastical matters with him". That did not stop Fabricius in the same letter from calling Agricola "that distinguished ornament of our Fatherland," whose "religious views...were compatible with reason, it is true, and were dazzling," though not "compatible with truth"; in 1551 Fabricius had already written the introductory poem to De re metallica in praise of Agricola.

According to traditional urban customs, as a former lord mayor he was entitled to a burial in the local mother church. His religious affiliation, however, outweighed his secular prerogatives and monumental service for the city. Chemnitz Protestant superintendent Tettelbach urged Prince August to command the refusal of a burial inside the city. The command was issued and Tettelbach immediately informed the Agricola party.

Upon the initiative of his childhood friend, Naumburg bishop Julius von Pflug, Agricola's body was carried off to Zeitz four days later, more than 50 km (31 mi) away, and interred by von Pflug in the Zeitz cathedral. Agricola's wife had a memorial plate commissioned and placed inside, that was already removed during the 17th century. Its text, however has been preserved in the Zeitz annals, and reads:

To the physician and mayor of Chemnitz, Georgius Agricola, a man most distinguished by piety and scholarship, who had rendered outstanding services to his city, whose legacy will bestow immortal glory on his name, whose spirit Christ himself absorbed into his eternal kingdom. His mourning wife and children. He died in the 62nd year of life on November 21, 1555 and was born in Glauchau on March 24, 1494

Atryparia agricolae, a Devonian brachiopod from the Holy Cross Mountains, is named in his honour.

== See also ==
- List of mineralogists
- Shen Kuo, 11th-century Chinese author on land formation and mineralogy
- Theophrastus
- Mineral collecting
