= Petrus Mosellanus =

German Renaissance humanist and scholar

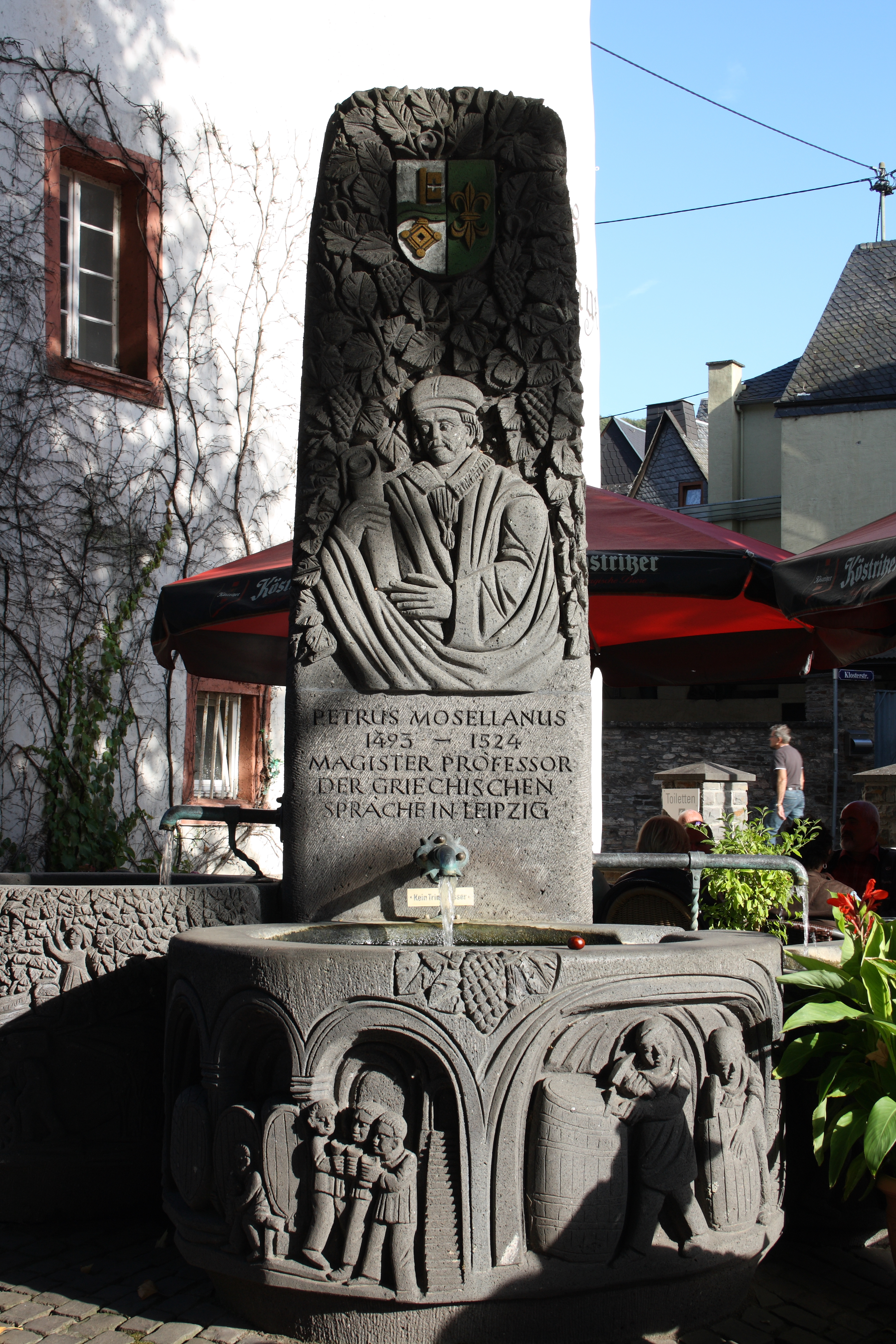
A memorial fountain in Bruttig-Fankel, Germany

Petrus Mosellanus Protegensis (real name Peter Schade; 1493, Bruttig – 19 April 1524, Leipzig) was a German Renaissance humanist scholar. He is best known for the popular work on rhetoric, Tabulae de schematibus et tropis, and his Paedologia.

He became professor at the University of Leipzig. He gave the opening Latin oration at the 1519 Leipzig Disputation between Johann Eck and Martin Luther.
