= Westsächsische Hochschule Zwickau =

Vocational university in Zwickau, Saxony, Germany

- WHZ
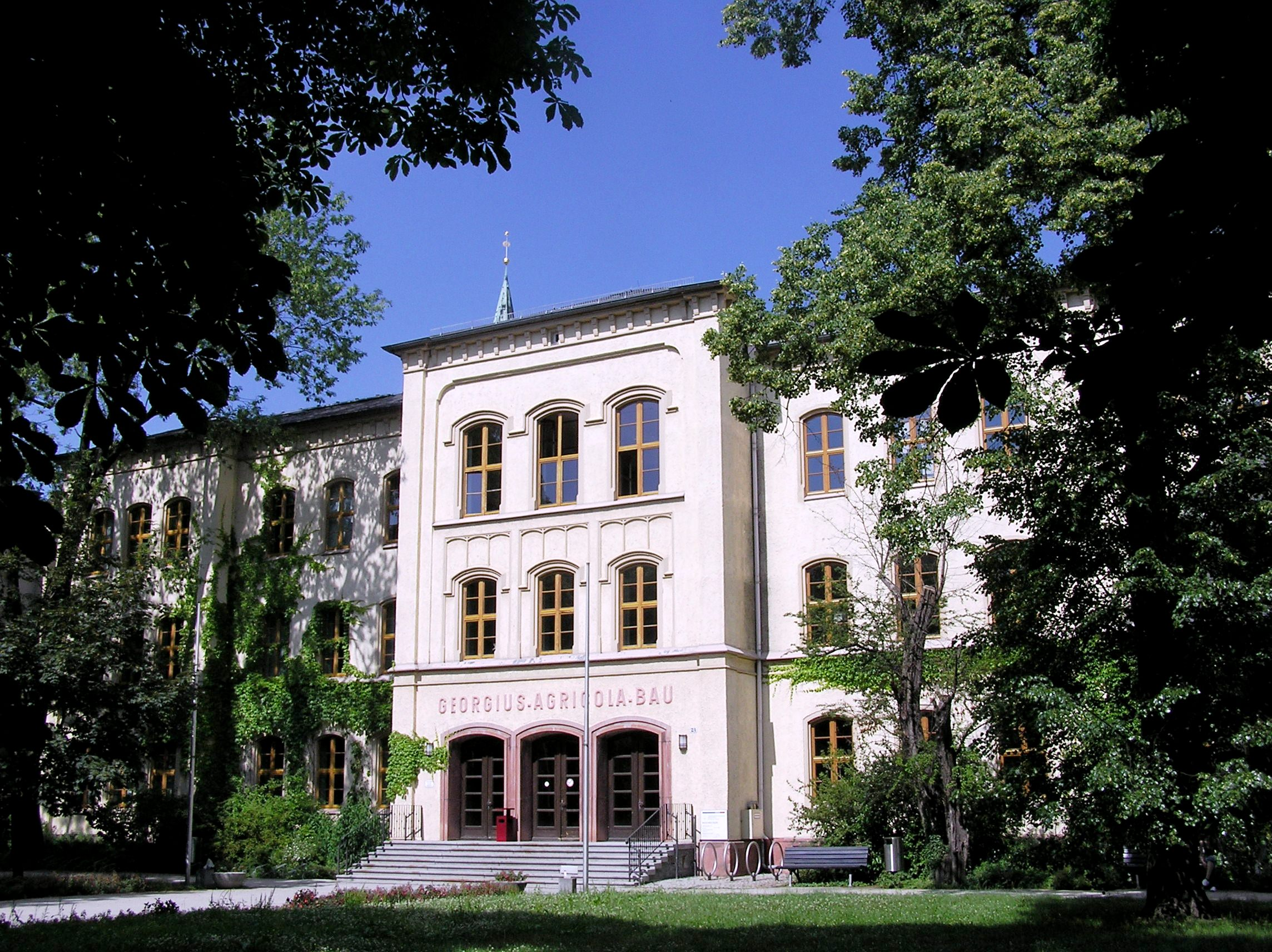
- Motto: university for mobility
- Type: Public
- Established: 1897
- Rector: Stephan Kassel
- Students: 3.300
- Location: Zwickau, Saxony, Germany; 50°42′58″N 12°29′40″E
- Website: www.fh-zwickau.de
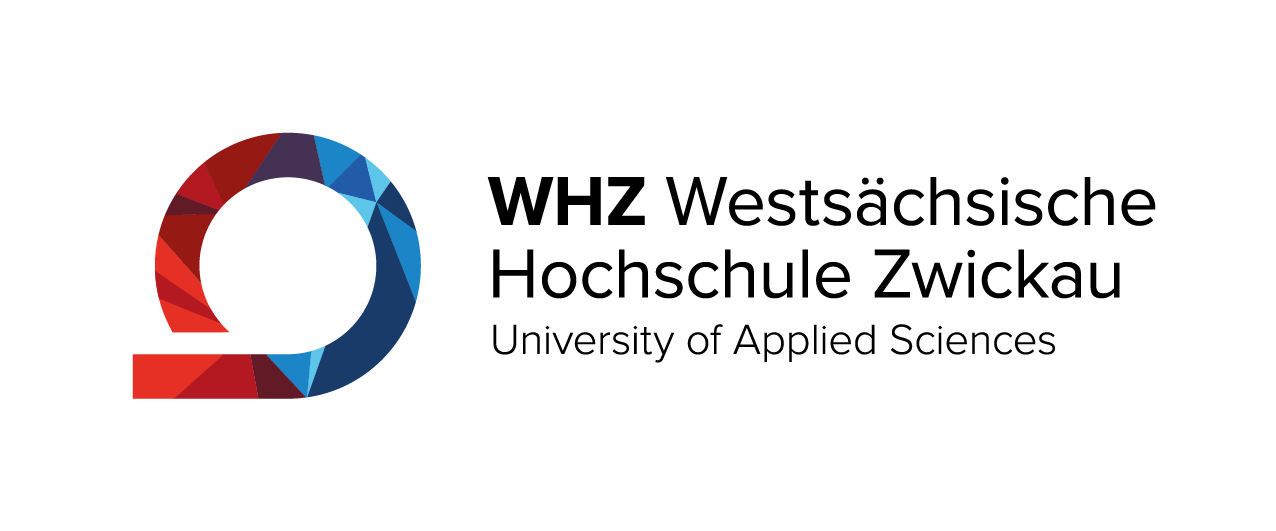

The Westsächsische Hochschule Zwickau – University of Applied Sciences Zwickau is a vocational university of about 3,300 students located in Zwickau. Saxony, Germany. It offers bachelor's, master's and traditional German Diplom degrees in four core areas: technology, economics, arts, and life sciences. The university also has further campuses in Markneukirchen, Reichenbach im Vogtland and Schneeberg.

== History ==
Zwickau's tradition of higher education reaches back to the founding of a Latin school in the late thirteenth century. The origins of the vocational university, however, are more connected to the boom of mining and industrial production in Saxony in the early 1800s. The rise of coal production and processing in the region created a demand for workers with a high level of technical training and industry pushed for the development of educational training institutions. A Sunday training school for workers was opened in 1828, followed by the Bergschule Zwickau, a school to teach technical skills related to mining, in 1862. By 1949, the Bergschule Zwickau had developed into a full-fledged mining engineering school. Parallel to the development of the mining school, in 1897 the engineers Paul Kirchhoff and Leander Hummel founded an engineering school in cooperation with the local municipal government.

In 1965, the mining engineering school and the general engineering school merged, eventually gaining the right to grant doctorates under the name Ingenieur-Hochschule Zwickau. In 1989, the institution assimilated a school for economics in Plauen and a plant-engineering and construction school in Glauchau, becoming a full technical university. After the reunification of Germany, there was an attempt to merge this engineering-focused technical university with Zwickau's teacher training college into one small university. This idea, however, lacked political support in the Saxon government and did not succeed. The teacher training college was assimilated into the Technical University of Chemnitz and the engineering school was changed to a Fachhochschule or vocational university, with the right to grant bachelor's and master's degrees, but not doctorates. The name of the engineering school was then changed to the current Westsächsische Hochschule Zwickau, or Westsächsische Hochschule Zwickau - University of Applied Sciences.

== Faculties ==
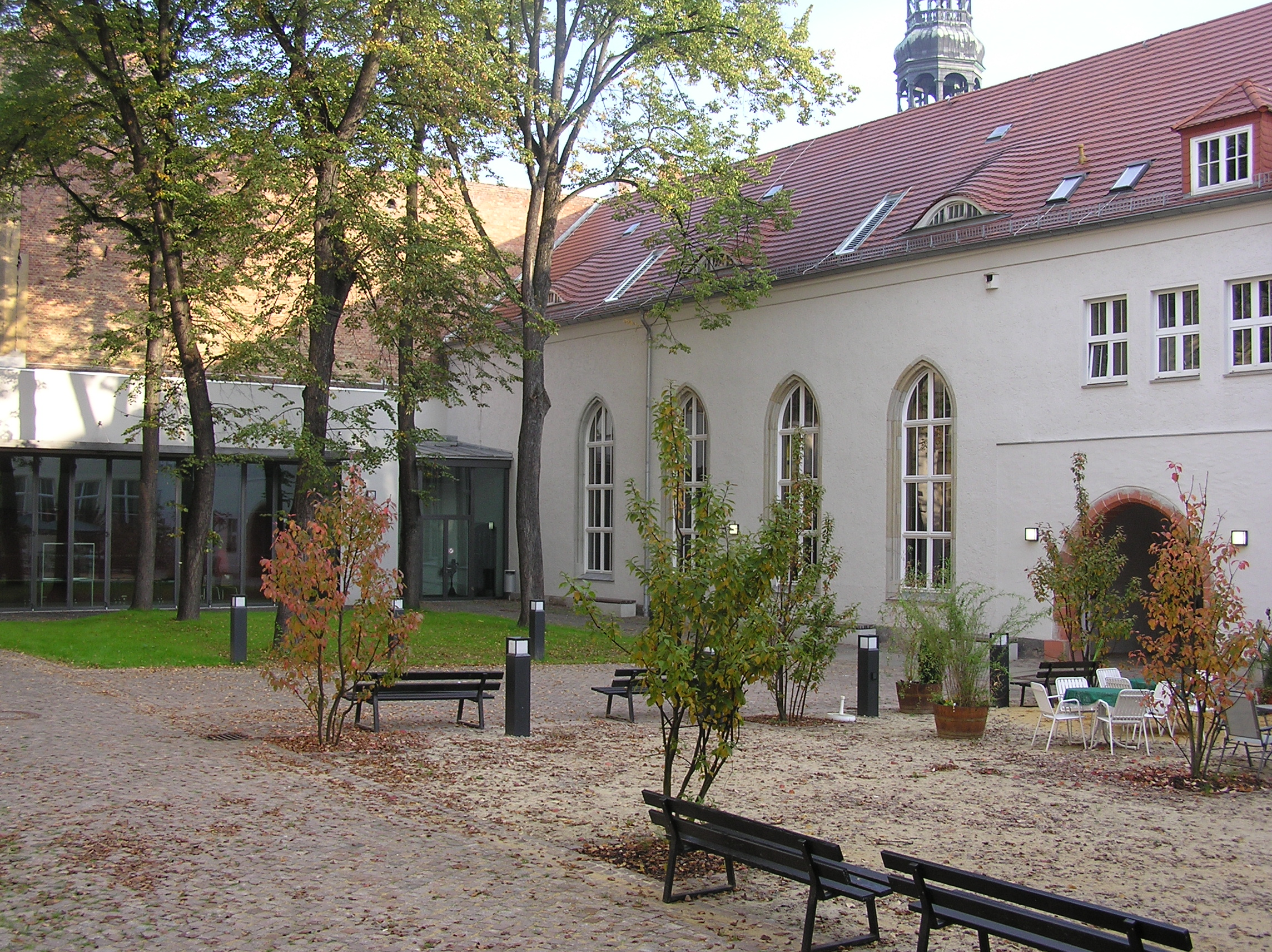
Auditorium of the University of Applied Sciences Zwickau, built on the area of a former monastery

Following the motto Technology, Economics and Quality of Life, the university is organised into eight faculties:

=== Applied Arts Schneeberg ===
The Faculty of Applied Arts Schneeberg conveys scientific, theoretical, artistic and design fundamentals. The broad based programme of study offers courses which lead to design and technical qualification.

Study Programmes: Design (with the core topics of Fashion Design, Woodwork/Product & Object Design, Textile Art/Textile Design), Musical Instrument Technology, Acoustics and Technology of Musical Instrument Making

=== Applied Languages and Intercultural Communication ===
The Faculty of Applied Languages and Intercultural Communication offers the courses of studies Languages and Business Administration and Sign Language Interpreting. In the study programme Languages and Business Administration the languages of focus, Chinese, French and Spanish/Portuguese, are taught at a high level both in the context of everyday and technical parlance; this also applies for English as a second language, which is mandatory for all students. The international orientation of this programme is emphasised by a year abroad, an integral part of the curriculum.

Study Programmes: Languages & Business Administration, Languages & Business Administration German-Chinese, Regional and European Project Management, Sign Language Interpreting

=== Automotive Engineering ===
The Faculty of Automotive Engineering offers programmes relating to automobiles.

Study Programmes: Automotive Engineering, Traffic and Transport Engineering, Building Energy and Air Conditioning Technology, Road Traffic Engineering

=== Electrical Engineering ===
Electrical engineers have already been educated in Zwickau since the founding of the Engineering School on 26 April 1897.

Study Programmes: Electrical Engineering, Information & Communication Technology, Automotive Electronics, Electrical and Electronic Systems

=== Faculty of Business and Economics ===
With numerous courses of study, institutes and departments, the Faculty of Business and Economics instructs and conducts research in a broad range of economic fields, taking interdisciplinary approaches and offering instruction with a focus on practical aspects.

Study Programmes: Business Administration, Management, Economics and Industrial Engineering, International Business, Controlling, Logistics, Computer Science in Economics

=== Health and Healthcare Sciences ===
The Faculty of Health and Healthcare Sciences offers an academic education in the field of social and health sciences, which can be allocated to the Life Quality Division.

Study Programmes: Health Care Management, Health Sciences, Management of Health Care Services

=== Automotive and Mechanical Engineering ===
The Faculty of Automotive and Mechanical Engineering is one of the WHZ's most active research faculties. Its courses of studies are closely aligned with the development and manufacture of automobiles.

Study Programmes: Mechanical Engineering, Automobile Production, Production Management, Textile Structures & Technologies, Production Optimization

=== Physical Engineering and Computer Science ===
The Faculty of Physical Engineering/Computer Sciences offers attractive bachelor's and master's courses in the fields of physical technologies, microprocessor technology and computer sciences.

Study Programmes: Biomedical Engineering, Computer Sciences, Data Science, Digital Health, Medical and Health Technology, Physical Engineering, Nanotechnology

== Programs ==
The WHZ's programs are divided into three core areas of focus: Technology, Economics and Quality of Life. The Technology category is the largest and incorporates a range of engineering disciplines, including many directly related to automotive production. The Economics category includes both traditional business administration and management courses as well as interdisciplinary programs such as Business and Engineering or Languages and Business Administration. Finally, the Quality of Life category includes a wide range of practical, interdisciplinary programs from various types of Design to applied Heath Sciences and Healthcare Management. The WHZ has two core campuses within the city of Zwickau as well as three satellite campuses in the towns of Reichenbach, Schneeberg and Markneukirchen. Schneeberg is home to the university's Applied Arts programs, which include Wood Design, Fashion Design and Textile Arts. Markneukirchen, historically a centre for musical instrument production, hosts the program in Musical Instrument Construction. Reichenbach is home to the Institute for Textile and Leather Technologies.

== Research ==
The university supports research efforts in connection with both public funding programs and industry projects, with a focus on applied research to solve practical problems. The industry partnerships mean a strong capacity for knowledge transfer between the academic and business worlds - the WHZ contributes to securing a thriving and innovative business sector in the region while also maintaining a good understanding of current industry needs.

In addition to professors and students, more than 150 employees work exclusively on projects supported with third-party funding and generate several million Euros annually in nearly 50 unique fields.

=== Research and transfer center objectives ===
- Ecological Energy and Drive Systems
- Traffic and Environment
- Development, Processing, Testing of New Materials
- Efficient Manufacturing Processes in Vehicle and Machine building
- Regional Promotion of Economic-Management and Export Promotion of Small and Medium-sized Enterprises

== Student life ==
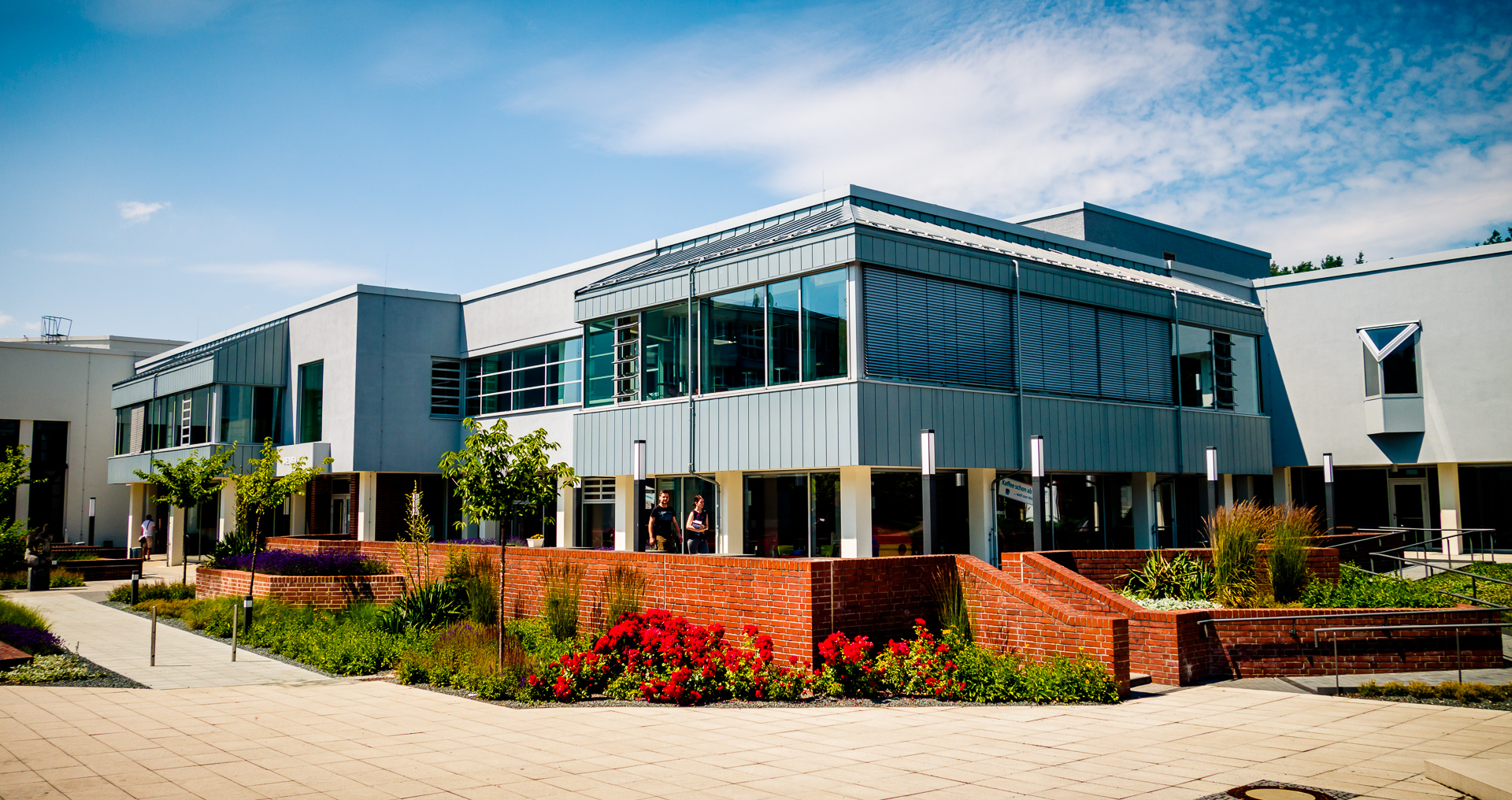
Lecture hall centre of the University of Applied Sciences Zwickau

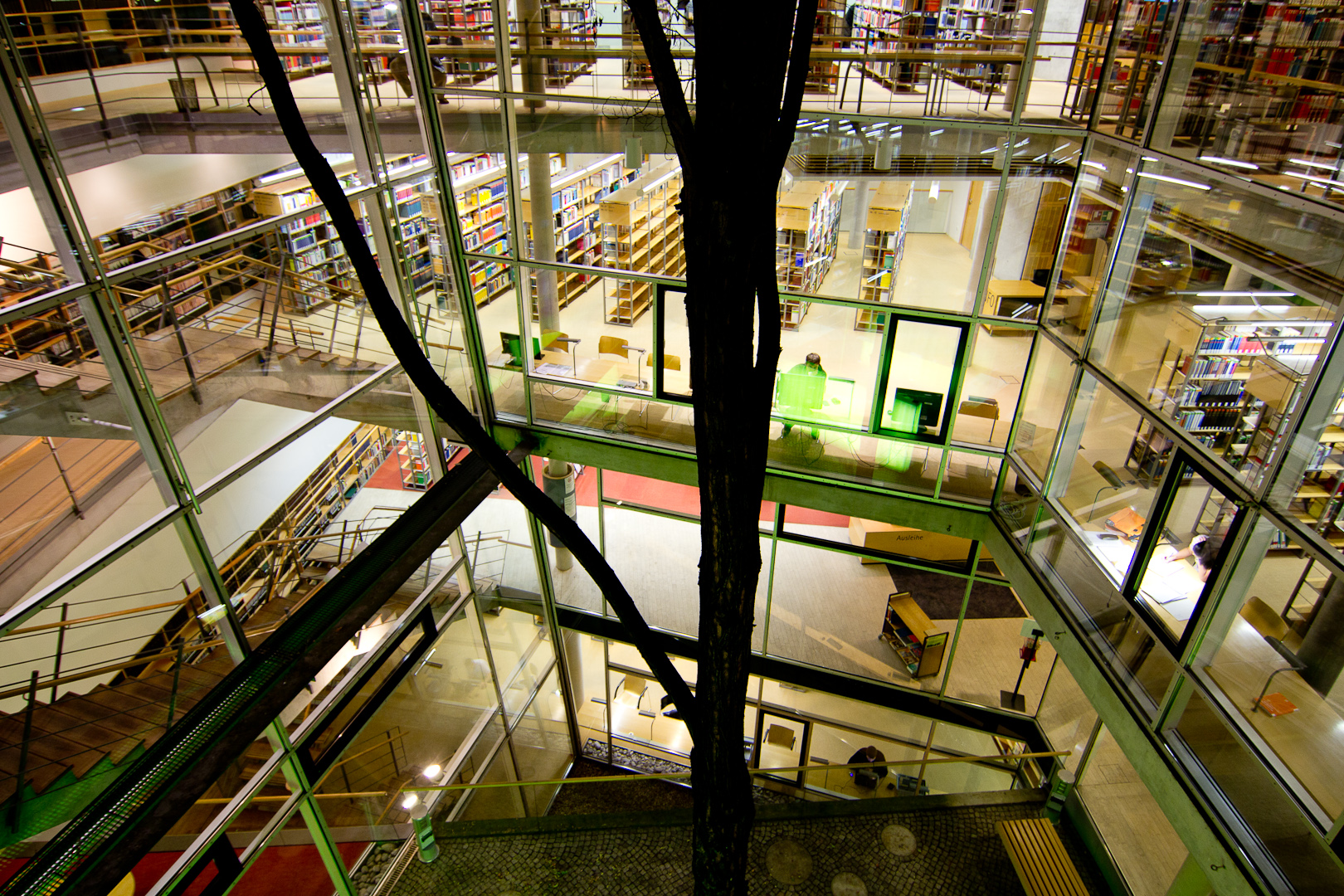
Library of the University of Applied Sciences Zwickau by night

Outside of classes, the university also offers a number of extracurricular activities, including a student choir and a range of casual sport programs. Since 2006, one of the most significant student groups at the WHZ has been the Formula Student Team. The student team constructs a single-seat, technically sophisticated race car and competes against other teams around the world at racing events. The competition also includes the business aspects of automotive manufacturing such as marketing and business planning. In 2008, the WHZ has been officially recognized as a “family friendly university.” It offers day-care and kindergarten places for the children of students, a mini children's library, a children's sports group and free meal cards in the cafeteria for children under 6. The university's students’ union operates three student clubs, which host events throughout the school year.

== Rankings ==
In 2016, WHZ was ranked No. 1 school for studying automotive engineering. The automotive engineering program here allows students to specialize in different phases of the course. These choices are car body engineering, internal combustion engines or automotive services.
