= Alfonso Petrucci =

Italian nobleman

His Eminence Alfonso Petrucci
- Cardinal-Deacon of San Teodoro
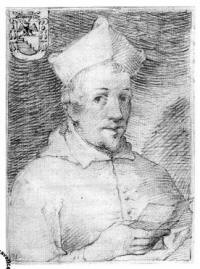
- Portrait of Alfonso Petrucci
- Church: Roman Catholic

Personal details
- Born: 1491 Siena, Republic of Siena
- Died: 16 July 1517 (age 26) Rome, Papal States

Alfonso Petrucci (c. 1491 – July 16, 1517) was an Italian nobleman, born to the Petrucci Family. He was the son of Pandolfo Petrucci. In 1511, he was created cardinal, which gave the Petrucci dynasty some influence within the church.

== Life ==
Alfonso Petrucci was born in Siena. In 1510 he was elected Bishop of Sovana, a suffragan of the Archdiocese of Siena, but resigned the See in July 1513 in favor of his relative, Lattanzio Petrucci. In March 1511 he was created Cardinal-Deacon of S. Teodoro pro hac vice by Pope Julius II.

He subsequently transferred to the Diocese of Massa Marittima. He attended the Fifth Council of the Lateran in February 1513, and so was already in Rome when Pope Julius died. At the conclave of 1513 he was among the younger cardinals that supported Giovanni de'Medici, who was elected Pope Leo X.

Pandolfo Petrucci died in 1512 and was succeeded as governor of Siena by Alfonso's brother Borghese. In March 1516, Leo replaced Borghese with his cousin Raffaello Petrucci, a long-time friend. who with the support of Florence, held power in Siena. Cardinal Alfonso agitated against this change.

In June 1517; he was deprived of the cardinalate and all his benefices and sentenced to death for allegedly plotting to kill Pope Leo X. Cardinal Raffaele Riario did not participate in the plot but was aware of it and did nothing to stop it. He only escaped execution by forfeiting his palace, which became the Apostolic Chancery.

According to Ludwig Pastor, it is not clear whether Alfonso Petrucci was strangled or beheaded. In any case, he was executed at Castel Sant'Angelo on July 16, 1517.

Catholic Church titles
Preceded by Adello Piccolomini	Bishop of Sovana; 1510–1513	Succeeded by Lattanzio Petrucci
Preceded by Ventura Benassai	Bishop of Massa Marittima; 1511–1517	Succeeded by Giovanni Gregorio Peroschi
Preceded by Federico Sanseverino	Cardinal-Priest of San Teodoro; 1511–1517	Succeeded by Federico Sanseverino
