= Borghese Petrucci =

Borghese Petrucci was an Italian politician, who ruled the Republic of Siena from 1512 to 1516.

== Early life and family ==
Petrucci was born in Siena in 1490, eldest son of Pandolfo Petrucci and Aurelia Borghese, daughter of Niccolò Borghese and brother of Cardinal Alfonso Petrucci. Borghese was presumably named in honor of his maternal grandfather.

== Ruler of Siena ==
He does not appear in the sources with official duties until on 6 February 1512, when his father, now ill and near death, decided to make him the city's ruler. The death of Pandolfo occurred May 21, 1512 and Borghese became the "Primus" of Siena and Monte dei Nove. Favored in government by his brother Alfonso, the Cardinal of Saint Theodore, he exercised the functions of government in a confrontation between the Kingdom of Spain and the Republic of Venice. He was an ally of the Kingdom of France, after the agreements concluded at Blois in 1513. Upon election of Giovanni de Medici as Pope Leo X, Petrucci tried to maintain Siena's independence allying with the Kingdom of Spain in 1511.

== 1516 coup ==
Siena was wedged between the Republic of Florence and the Papal States, and maintained ties between Petrucci and the Baglioni of Perugia. Leo X, unable to occupy the territories directly, facilitated a coup on 8 March 1516, by Raffaello Petrucci, Bishop of Grosseto and lord of Castel S. Angelo.

== Banishment ==
Borghese Petrucci was banished from Siena in May 1516 and moved to Naples, where, in the years following, he was named Baron. The date of his death is unknown.
