= Raffaello Petrucci =

Raffaello Petrucci (1472 in Siena – 17 December 1522, in Rome) was a Cardinal and Roman Catholic bishop.

== Biography ==
He was born in Siena, circa 1472. He was the son of Giacoppo Petrucci and the Florentine Nanna Fantoni.

In 1491 he was awarded a canonry of the cathedral of Siena. Since 1494, the year of the Medici expulsion from Florence, he represented the pro-Medici party, advocating for Piero de Medici and his attempts to return home. Between 1495 - 1497, he handled negotiations with the Republic of Siena, aimed at obtaining military support, at a stage where the Republic of Florence had to deal with the rebellion of Pisa (self-proclaiming as an independent republic (1494)) and of Montepulciano (1494), and with the campaign by Bartolomeo d'Alviano on behalf of the Republic of Venice, which targeted Casentino (1496–1497).

In 1497 his father died, and he moved to Rome to follow Cardinal Giovanni de Medici, remaining bound to him in his years of exile, under the pontificates of Alexander VI and Julius II. On 4 August he was elected as bishop of Grosseto, and appointed apostolic prothonotary. His tenure in Siena was discreet because of his uncle Pandolfo's preponderance, who, after the agreements signed between the Republic of Siena and Florence in 1498, came to take on the role of leading citizen or Primus. Politically, the agreement between the two Republics sanctioned the defeat of both Venetian Niccolo Borghesi and pro-Medicean Raffaele Petrucci.

In March 1513 Giovanni de' Medici became Pope Leo X. Leo appointed Petrucci his domestic prelate and castellan, or prefect, of Castel Sant'Angelo, giving him a house with a vegetable garden in Rome, and in May he appointed Eustachio, his fourteen-year-old son, captain of ten crossbowmen of his guard.

The election of Cardinal Medici to the papacy, opened up the possibility of him taking on a more active role in papal policy, especially concerning disagreements between cousins Borghese and Alfonso with Leo X. This led to him claiming the role of Primus and as party leader. In March 1516, with the support of the Pope and Florence, he implemented a coup that brought him to power in Siena in place of his cousin Borghese Petrucci. Raffaello maintained a moderate conduct, aimed at seeking the consensus of the citizens, and not increasing discontent with fiscal impositions. In the wake of greater Church responsibility, he was forced to cede control to his cousin, Francesco in 1522.

On 1 July 1517, during the confused events surrounding the "conspiracy of the cardinals", his name was included among the 31 new cardinal appointments of Leo X. On 26 December he received the title of Santa Susanna. On 14 March 1519 he was appointed apostolic administrator of Bertinoro, keeping the job exactly one year, before resigning in favor of his son Pietro. Later he took the position of Abbot of San Galgano. On 6 February 1520 he was elected bishop of Sovana, belonging to the diocese of Grosseto.

From the conclave that brought on the election of Adrian VI as Pope (9 January 1522), Raffaello was named one of the cardinals in charge of welcoming the new Pope from Utrecht at Livorno. He and the other four prelates presented themselves armed and in secular clothes, provoking a harsh rebuke of the pontiff. That year, Renzo da Ceri (hired by the enemies of the Medici) attempted a new invasion of the territories of the Republic. The past two years (1520–1522), he enlisted his cousin Francis Camillo Petrucci of Siena to govern, especially in his moments of absence.

He died at his villa in Bibbiano on 17 December 1522 and is buried in the Basilica of San Domenico, Siena. According to Ludwig Pastor, "he led a completely worldly life and was hated especially for his avarice".

== Sources ==
- Maurizio Gattoni, Leo X and the geo-politics of the Papal States (1513–1521), Vatican City, Vatican Archives Collectanea (47), 2000;
- Maurizio Gattoni, foreign policy and the primacy of Petrucci in Siena (1498–1524), in Siena and its territory in the Renaissance, edited by *M. Ascheri, vol. III, Siena, Holm 2000, p. 215-222;
- UG Mondolfo, Pandolfo Petrucci, Lord of Siena, Siena 1899
- V. Lusini, A paper on Raphael Petrucci, castellan of Castel S. Angelo, in Siena Bulletin of National History, The (1894), p. 117-123;
- N. Mengozzi, Cardinal Raphael Petrucci of Siena, in Siena Bulletin of National History, XX (1913), p. 147-157;
- R. Terziani, The Government of Siena from Medieval to Modern. Continuity Republican at the time of Petrucci (1487–1525) by Betti Publishing, Siena, 2002, reprinted 2006;
- I. Ugurgieri-Azzolini, pumps Siena, Pistoia 1649.

Catholic Church titles
Preceded by	Bishop of Grosseto; 1497-1522	Succeeded by Ferdinando Ponzetti
Preceded by Leonardo Grosso della Rovere	Cardinal-Priest of Santa Susanna; 1517-1522	Succeeded by Antonio Sanseverino
Preceded by Angelo Petrucci	Administrator of Bertinoro; 1519-1520	Succeeded by Pietro Petrucci
Preceded by	Bishop of Sovana; 1520-1522	Succeeded by
