= Machiavellianism (politics) =

Political philosophy of Niccolò Machiavelli

Machiavellianism (or Machiavellism) is widely defined as the political philosophy of the Italian Renaissance diplomat Niccolò Machiavelli, usually associated with realism in foreign and domestic politics, and with the view that those who lead governments must prioritize the stability of the regime over ethical concerns. There is no scholarly consensus as to the precise nature of Machiavelli's philosophy, or what his intentions were with his works. The word Machiavellianism first appeared in the English language in 1607, due to Machiavelli's popularity, often as a byword for unsavory government politics.

== Overview ==
=== The Prince ===
After his exile from political life in 1512, Machiavelli took to a life of writing, which led to the publishing of his most famous work, The Prince. The book would become infamous for its recommendations for absolute rulers to be ready to act in unscrupulous ways, such as resorting to fraud and treachery, elimination of political opponents, and the use of fear as a means of controlling subjects. Machiavelli's view that acquiring a state and maintaining it requires evil means has been noted as the chief theme of the treatise. He has become infamous for this advice, so much so that the adjective Machiavellian would later on describe a type of politics that is "marked by cunning, duplicity, or bad faith".

=== Republicanism and other ideas ===
While Machiavelli has become widely popular for his work on principalities, his other major work, The Discourses on Livy, focused mainly on republican statecraft, and his recommendations for a well ordered republic. Machiavelli noted how free republics have power structures that are better than principalities. He also notes how advantageous a government by a republic could be as opposed to just a single ruler. However, Machiavelli's more controversial statements on politics can also be found even in his other works. For example, Machiavelli notes that sometimes extraordinary means, such as violence, can be used in re-ordering a corrupt city. In one area, he praises Romulus, who murdered his brother and co-ruler in order to have power by himself to found the city of Rome. In a few passages he sometimes explicitly acts as an advisor of tyrants as well.

Some scholars have even asserted that the goal of his ideal republic does not differ greatly from his principality, as both rely on rather ruthless measures for aggrandizement and empire.

In one passage of The Prince, Machiavelli subverts the advice given by Cicero to avoid duplicity and violence, by saying that the prince should "be the fox to avoid the snares, and a lion to overwhelm the wolves". It would become one of Machiavelli's most notable statements.

Because cruelty and deception play such important roles in his politics, it is not unusual for related issues—such as murder and betrayal—to rear their heads with regularity.

Machiavelli's own concept of virtue, which he calls "virtù", is original and is usually seen by scholars as different from the traditional viewpoints of other political philosophers. Virtù can consist of any quality at the moment that helps a ruler maintain his state, even being ready to engage in necessary evil when it is advantageous.

Due to the treatise's controversial analysis on politics, in 1559, the Catholic Church banned The Prince, putting it on the Index Librorum Prohibitorum.

Machiavelli criticized and rejected the classical biblical and Christian thought as he viewed that it celebrated humility and otherworldly things, and thus it made the Italians of his day "weak and effeminate". While Machiavelli's own religious allegiance has been debated, it is assumed that he had a low regard of contemporary Christianity.

Scholars have noted that Machiavelli provides a framework for state building specifically designed for the maintenance of governments. To some, his ideas often set aside traditional doctrines, focusing instead on an original approach to government. Machiavelli usually focuses on the most extreme events in history such as the foundations of human societies and governments. Machiavelli views that the ideas entertained by the rulers of his day hurt their abilities to govern effectively.

Machiavelli emphasizes the originality of his endeavor in several instances. Many scholars note that Machiavelli seems particularly original and that he frequently seems to act “without any regard” for his predecessors. Some interpreters have even referred to him as the initiator of contemporary philosophy. However, all thinkers engage to some extent with their predecessors, even (or perhaps particularly) those who aim to fundamentally disagree with prior thoughts. Therefore, even with a figure as seemingly innovative as Machiavelli, scholars have looked deeper into his works to consider possible historical and philosophical influences. Although Machiavelli examined ancient humanists, he does not frequently reference them as authorities. In his time, the most commonly cited discussion of classical virtues was Book 1 of Cicero’s De officiis. Yet, Cicero is never mentioned in The Prince, and is mentioned only three times in the Discourses. Machiavelli advocates for all governments to focus on the foundation of their states, with his advice aiming to ensure the stability and longevity of the specific regime he was referring to.

=== Reception of Machiavelli ===
Anti-Machiavellism

In the late 1530s, immediately following the publication of The Prince, Machiavelli's philosophy was seen as an immoral ideology that corrupted European politics. Reginald Pole read the treatise while he was in Italy, and on which he commented: "I found this type of book to be written by an enemy of the human race. It explains every means whereby religion, justice and any inclination toward virtue could be destroyed". Machiavelli's works were received similarly by other popular European authors, especially in Elizabethan England. The English playwrights William Shakespeare and Christopher Marlowe incorporated their views into some of their works. Shakespeare's titular character, Richard III, refers to Machiavelli in Henry VI, Part III, as the "murderous Machiavel".

The Anti-Machiavel is an 18th-century essay by Frederick the Great, king of Prussia and patron of Voltaire, rebutting The Prince. It was first published in September 1740, a few months after Frederick became king. Denis Diderot, the French philosopher, viewed Machiavellianism as "an abhorrent type of politics" and the "art of tyranny".

== See also ==
- National interest
- Might makes right
- Realpolitik
- Tyranny
- Virtù
