= Machiavel =

Machiavel is the traditional French rendition of the surname of the Italian philosopher Niccolò Machiavelli.

In English, it may refer to:

- Machiavellianism (politics), especially a stock type of villain in Elizabethan drama (also Machievel)
- Machiavel (band), a Belgian rock band
