= The Prince =

Political treatise by Niccolò Machiavelli

- Title page of a 1550 edition
- Author: Niccolò Machiavelli
- Original title: De Principatibus / Il Principe
- Language: Italian
- Subject: Political philosophy Political science
- Publisher: Antonio Blado d'Asola
- Publication date: 1532
- Publication place: Italy
- Followed by: Discourses on Livy
- Text: The Prince at Wikisource

The Prince (Italian: Il Principe [il ˈprintʃipe]; Latin: De Principatibus) is a 16th-century political treatise written by the Italian diplomat and political philosopher Niccolò Machiavelli in the form of an instruction guide for new princes. Many commentators have viewed that one of the main themes of The Prince is that immoral acts are sometimes necessary to achieve political glory.

From Machiavelli's correspondence, a version was being written in 1513, using a Latin title, De Principatibus (Of Principalities). However, the printed version was not published until 1532, five years after Machiavelli's death. This was carried out with the permission of the Medici pope Clement VII, but "long before then, in fact since the first appearance of The Prince in manuscript, controversy had swirled about his writings".

Although The Prince was written as if it were a traditional work in the mirrors for princes style, it was generally agreed as being especially innovative. This is because Machiavelli appears to distance his book from all of the classical works of political philosophy, as he viewed that they were too concerned with the ideal regime. Machiavelli illustrates his reasoning using remarkable comparisons of classical, biblical, and medieval events, including many positive references to the murderous career of Cesare Borgia, which occurred during Machiavelli's own diplomatic career.

The Prince is sometimes claimed to be one of the first works of modern philosophy, especially modern political philosophy, in which practical effect is taken to be more important than any abstract ideal. Its worldview came in direct conflict with the dominant Catholic and scholastic doctrines of the time, particularly those on politics and ethics.

This short treatise is the most remembered of Machiavelli's works, and the most responsible for the later pejorative use of the word "Machiavellian". It even contributed to the modern negative connotations of the words "politics" and "politician" in Western countries. In subject matter, it overlaps with the much longer Discourses on Livy, which was written a few years later. In its use of near-contemporary Italians as examples of people who perpetrated criminal deeds for political ends, Leo Strauss compared the lesser-known work, the Life of Castruccio Castracani, to The Prince.

== Summary ==
Each part of The Prince has attracted extensive commentary over centuries. Machiavelli's writings continue to provoke examination of leadership and government, posing age-old issues regarding the nature of power and the decisions that rulers must make to preserve it.

=== Letter to Lorenzo de' Medici, Duke of Urbino ===
Machiavelli prefaces his work with an introductory letter to Lorenzo de' Medici, Duke of Urbino, the recipient of his work. In the letter Machiavelli states that his work contains knowledge he gained from his political experiences and "hardships and dangers". He describes himself as a "humble servant", and that he filled the book with the "knowledge of the actions of great men".

=== The subject matter: New Princedoms (Chapters 1 and 2) ===
The Prince starts by describing its subject. In the first sentence, Machiavelli uses the word "state" (Italian stato, which could also mean "status") to cover, in neutral terms, "all forms of organization of supreme political power, whether republican or princely". How the word "state" acquired its modern meaning during the Renaissance has been the subject of much academic debate, with this sentence and similar ones in the works of Machiavelli being considered particularly important.

Machiavelli explained here that The Prince is about princedoms, indicating that he has written about republics elsewhere, which is a reference to the Discourses on Livy. Commentators note that in fact he mixes discussion of republics into this work in many places, effectively treating republics as a type of princedom with many strengths. More importantly, and less traditionally, he distinguishes new princedoms from established hereditary princedoms. He deals with hereditary princedoms quickly in Chapter 2, saying that they are much easier to rule. For such a prince, "unless extraordinary vices cause him to be hated, it is reasonable to expect that his subjects will be naturally well disposed towards him". Gilbert (1938:19–23), comparing this claim to traditional presentations of advice for princes, wrote that the novelty in chapters 1 and 2 is the "deliberate purpose of dealing with a new ruler who will need to establish himself in defiance of custom". Normally, these types of works were addressed only to hereditary princes. He thinks Machiavelli may have been influenced by Tacitus as well as his own experience.

This categorization of regime types is also "un-Aristotelian" and simpler than the traditional one found for example in Aristotle's Politics, which divides regimes into those ruled by a single monarch, an oligarchy, or by the people, in a democracy. Machiavelli also ignores the classical distinctions between the good and corrupt forms, for example, between monarchy and tyranny.

=== "Mixed" princedoms (Chapters 3–5) ===
New princedoms are either totally new or they are "mixed", meaning that they are new parts of an older state, already belonging to that prince.

==== New conquests added to older states (Chapter 3) ====
Machiavelli generalizes that there were several virtuous Roman ways to hold a newly acquired province, using a republic as an example of how new princes can act:

- to install one's princedom in the new acquisition, or to install colonies of one's people there, which is better.
- to indulge the lesser powers of the area without increasing their power.
- to put down the powerful states.
- not to allow a foreign power to gain reputation.

More generally, Machiavelli emphasizes that one should have regard not only for present problems but also for the future ones. One should not "enjoy the benefit of time", but rather the benefit of one's virtue and prudence, because time can bring evil, as well as good.

Machiavelli notes in this chapter on the "natural and ordinary desire to acquire" and as such, those who act on this desire can be "praised or blamed" depending on the success of their acquisitions. He then goes into detail about how the King of France failed in his conquest of Italy, even saying how he could have succeeded. Machiavelli views doing harm to enemies as a necessity, stating, "if an injury is to be done to a man, it should be so severe that the prince is not in fear of revenge".

==== Conquered kingdoms (Chapter 4) ====
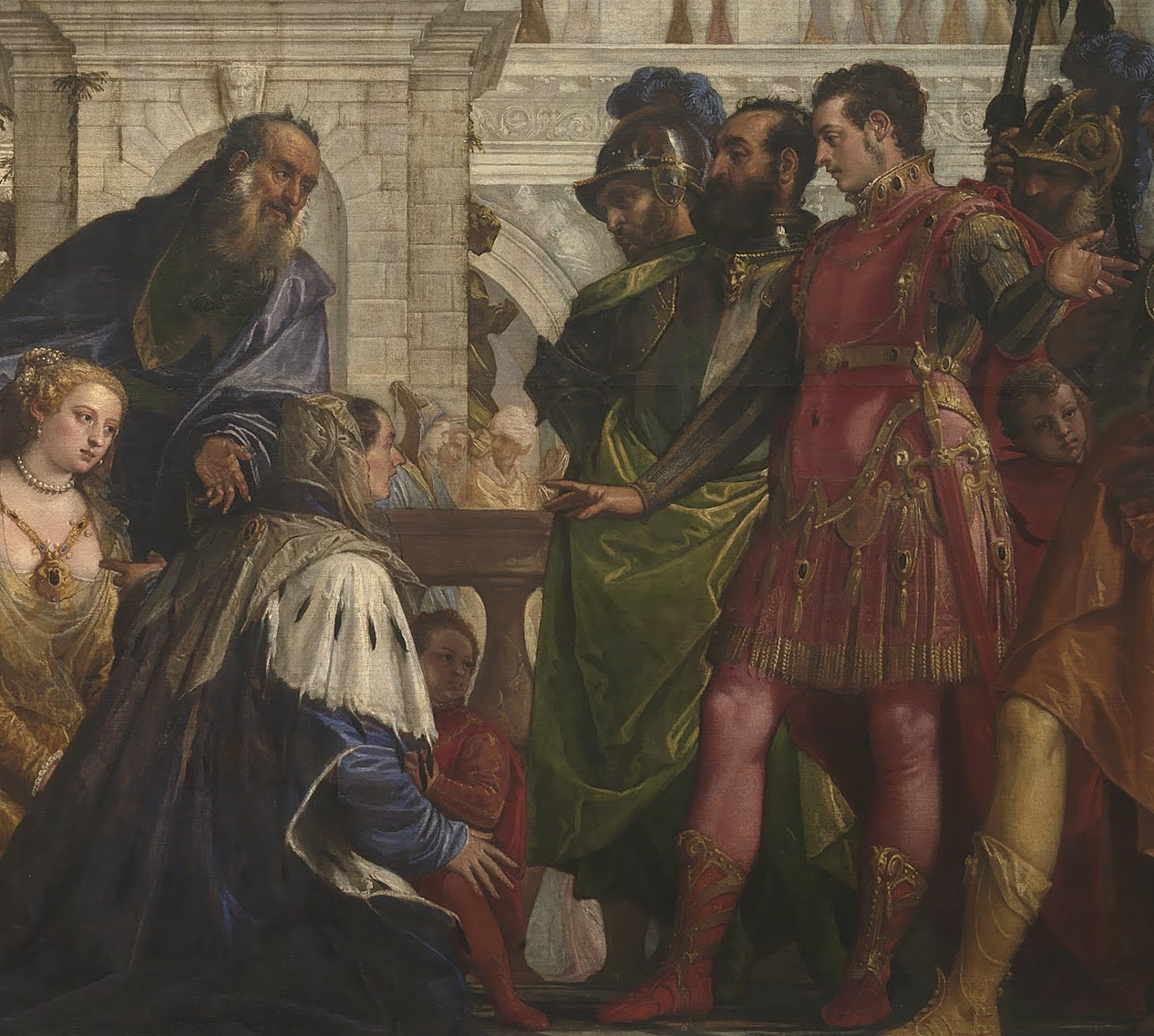
A 16th-century Italian impression of the family of Darius III, emperor of Persia, before their conqueror, Alexander the Great: Machiavelli explained that in his time the Near East was again ruled by an empire, the Ottoman Empire, with similar characteristics to that of Darius—seen from the viewpoint of a potential conqueror.

In some cases, the old king of the conquered kingdom depended on his lords; 16th-century France, or in other words France as it was at the time of writing of The Prince, is given by Machiavelli as an example of such a kingdom. These are easy to enter, but difficult to hold.

When the kingdom revolves around the king, with everyone else his servant, then it is difficult to enter, but easy to hold. The solution is to eliminate the old bloodline of the prince. Machiavelli used the Persian empire of Darius III, conquered by Alexander the Great, to illustrate this point, and then noted that if one considers it, they will find this historical example similar to the "kingdom of the Turk" (Ottoman Empire) in their time – making this a potentially easier conquest to hold than France would be.

==== Conquered free states, with their own laws and orders (Chapter 5) ====
Gilbert (1938:34) notes that this chapter is quite atypical of any previous books for princes. Gilbert supposed the need to discuss conquering free republics is linked to Machiavelli's project to unite Italy, which contained some free republics. As he also notes, the chapter in any case makes it clear that holding such a state is highly difficult for a prince. Machiavelli gives three options:

- Ruin them, as Rome destroyed Carthage, and also as Machiavelli says the Romans eventually had to do in Greece.
- Go to live there and rule it personally.
- Or preserve the city by establishing an oligarchical state led by the natives.

Machiavelli advises the ruler to go the first route, stating that if a prince does not destroy a city, he can expect "to be destroyed by it".

=== Totally new states (Chapters 6–9) ===
==== Conquests by virtue (Chapter 6) ====
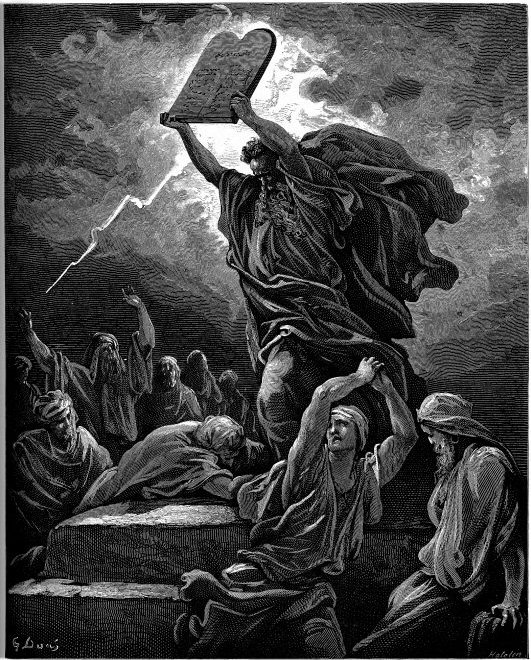
Machiavelli described Moses as a conquering prince, who founded new modes and orders by force of arms, which he used willingly to kill many of his own people. Other sources describe the reasons behind his success differently.

Machiavelli claims that princes who rise to power through their own virtue (virtù) rather than fortune (fortuna) tend to have a hard time holding on to their principality, but once they overcome their enemies they are very secure in their position. This is because they eliminate their opponents and earn respect from everyone else. Since they are strong and more self-sufficient, they have to make fewer compromises with their allies.

Machiavelli writes that introducing "new orders" is one of the most dangerous and difficult things a prince can do. Part of the reason is that people are naturally resistant to change. Those who benefited from the old order will resist change very fiercely, and those who may stand to benefit from the new order will be less enthusiastic in their support, because the new order is unfamiliar and they are not certain it will live up to its promises. Moreover, it is impossible for the prince to satisfy everybody's expectations. Inevitably, he will disappoint some of his followers. Therefore, a prince must have the means to force his supporters to keep supporting him even when they start having second thoughts, otherwise he will lose his power. Only armed prophets, like Moses, succeed in bringing lasting change.

Machiavelli was not the first thinker to notice this pattern. Allan Gilbert wrote: "In wishing new laws and yet seeing danger in them Machiavelli was not himself an innovator," because this idea was traditional and could be found in Aristotle's writings. But Machiavelli went much further than any other author in his emphasis on this aim, and Gilbert associates Machiavelli's emphasis upon such drastic aims with the level of corruption to be found in Italy.

Machiavelli places emphasis on the new prince, as he views that all societies are created by such men.

==== Conquest by fortune, meaning by someone else's virtue (Chapter 7) ====
According to Machiavelli, when a prince comes to power through luck or the blessings of powerful figures within the regime, he typically has an easy time gaining power but a hard time keeping it thereafter, because his power is dependent on his benefactors' goodwill. He does not command the loyalty of the armies and officials that maintain his authority, and these can be withdrawn from him at a whim. Having risen the easy way, it is not even certain that such a prince has the skill and strength to stand on his own feet.

This is not necessarily true in every case. Machiavelli cites Cesare Borgia as an example of a lucky prince who escaped this pattern. Through cunning political maneuvers, he managed to secure his power base. Cesare was made commander of the papal armies by his father, Pope Alexander VI, but was also heavily dependent on mercenary armies loyal to the Orsini brothers and the support of the French king. Borgia won over the allegiance of the Orsini brothers' followers with better pay and prestigious government posts. To pacify the Romagna, he sent in his henchman, Remirro de Orco, to commit acts of violence. When Remirro started to become hated for his actions, Borgia responded by ordering him to be "cut in two" to show the people that the cruelty was not from him, although it was. When some of his mercenary captains started to plot against him, he had them captured and executed. When it looked as though the king of France would abandon him, Borgia sought new alliances.

Finally, Machiavelli makes a point that bringing new benefits to a conquered people will not be enough to cancel the memory of old injuries, an idea Allan Gilbert said can be found in Tacitus and Seneca the Younger.

John Scott and Vickie Sullivan assert that, in Machiavelli ascribing Borgia's fall to the death of his father, what Borgia should have done is eliminated the papacy.

==== Of Those Who Have Obtained a Principality Through Crimes (Chapter 8) ====
Machiavelli focuses this chapter on principalities in which the new prince secured his power through cruel, immoral deeds, such as the murder of political rivals.

Machiavelli offers two rulers to imitate, Agathocles of Syracuse and Oliverotto Euffreducci. After Agathocles became Praetor of Syracuse, he called a meeting of the city's elite. At his signal, his soldiers killed all the senators and the wealthiest citizens, completely destroying the old oligarchy. He declared himself ruler with no opposition. So secure was his power that he could afford to absent himself to go off on military campaigns in Africa.

Machiavelli then states that the behavior of Agathocles is not simply virtue, as he says, "Yet one cannot call it virtue to kill one's citizens, betray one's friends, to be without faith, without mercy, without religion; these modes can enable one to acquire empire, but not glory. [...] Nonetheless, his savage cruelty and inhumanity, together with his infinite crimes, do not permit him to be celebrated among the most excellent men. Thus, one cannot attribute to fortune or virtue what he achieved without either."

Machiavelli then goes to his next example, Oliverotto de Fermo, an Italian condottiero who recently came to power by killing all his enemies, including his uncle Giovanni Fogliani, at a banquet. He invited all of the notable people of Fermo, including his uncle, to a dinner to discuss serious political matters. After he led the nobles into a room, his soldiers came from secret places and killed them all. After this, he laid siege to the governing council and terrified the magistrates into accepting a government with himself as absolute ruler. However, Oliverotto would later himself be killed in the same way his opponents were, as Cesare Borgia had him strangled after he invited Oliverotto and Vitellozzo Vitelli to a friendly setting.

Machiavelli advises that a prince should carefully calculate all the wicked deeds he needs to do to secure his power, and then execute them all in one stroke. In this way, his subjects will slowly forget his cruel deeds and the prince can better align himself with his subjects. Princes who fail to do this, who hesitate in their ruthlessness, will have to "keep a knife by his side" and protect himself at all costs, as he can never trust himself amongst his subjects.

Gilbert (1938:51–55) remarks that this chapter is even less traditional than those it follows, not only in its treatment of criminal behavior, but also in the advice to take power from people at a stroke, noting that precisely the opposite had been advised by Aristotle in his Politics (5.11.1315a13). On the other hand, Gilbert shows that another piece of advice in this chapter, to give benefits when it will not appear forced, was traditional.

In Machiavelli both ascribing and denying the word "virtue" to Agathocles' actions, many scholars have debated whether or not Machiavelli is adhering to or subverting the classical doctrine on political virtue.

==== Becoming a prince by the selection of one's fellow citizens (Chapter 9) ====
A "civil principality" is one in which a citizen comes to power "not through crime or other intolerable violence", but by the support of his fellow citizens. This, he says, does not require extreme virtue or fortune, only "fortunate astuteness". For this is one of the four means of coming about a principality (the other three being by virtue, fortune, and criminality).

Machiavelli makes an important distinction between two groups (Machiavelli calls them "humors") that are present in every city, and have very different appetites driving them: the "great" and the "people". The "great" wish to oppress and rule the "people", while the "people" wish not to be ruled or oppressed. A principality is not the only outcome possible from these appetites, because it can also lead to either "liberty" or "license".

A principality is put into place either by the "great" or the "people" when they have the opportunity to take power, but find resistance from the other side. They assign a leader who can be popular to the people while the great benefit, or a strong authority defending the people against the great.

Machiavelli goes on to say that a prince who obtains power through the support of the nobles has a harder time staying in power than someone who is chosen by the common people; since the former finds himself surrounded by people who consider themselves his equals. He has to resort to malevolent measures to satisfy the nobles.

One cannot by fair dealing, and without injury to others, satisfy the nobles, but you can satisfy the people, for their object is more righteous than that of the nobles, the latter wishing to oppress, while the former only desire not to be oppressed.

Also, a prince cannot afford to keep the common people hostile as they are larger in number, while the nobles are smaller.

Therefore, the great should be made and unmade every day. Two types of great people might be encountered:

1. Those who are bound to the prince: Concerning these it is important to distinguish between two types of obligated great people, those who are rapacious and those who are not. It is the latter who can and should be honored.
2. Those who are not bound to the new prince: Once again, these need to be divided into two types – those with a weak spirit (a prince can make use of them if they are of good counsel) and those who shun being bound because of their own ambition (these should be watched and feared as enemies).

Machiavelli advises:

- That a prince lay his political foundations on the people
- One should avoid ruling via magistrates, if one wishes to be able to "ascend" to absolute rule quickly and safely.
- A prince should make sure that the people have need "of the state and of him", at all times.

=== How to judge the strength of principalities (Chapter 10) ===
The way to judge the strength of a princedom is to see whether it can defend itself, or whether it needs to depend on allies. This does not just mean that the cities should be prepared and the people trained; a prince who is hated is also exposed.

=== Ecclesiastical principalities (Chapter 11) ===
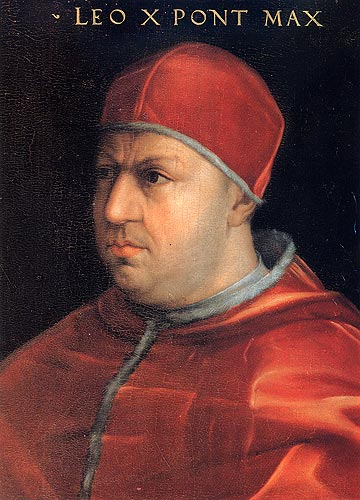
Leo X: a pope, but also a member of the Medici family. Machiavelli suggested they should treat the church as a princedom, as the Borgia family had, in order to conquer Italy, and found new modes and orders.

This type of "principality" refers explicitly to the Catholic Church as an example, which is of course not traditionally thought of as a principality. According to Machiavelli, these are relatively easy to maintain, once founded. They do not need to defend themselves militarily, nor to govern their subjects.

Machiavelli discusses the recent history of the Church as if it were a princedom that was in competition to conquer Italy against other princes. He points to factionalism as a historical weak point in the Church, and points to the recent example of the Borgia family as a better strategy which almost worked. He then explicitly proposes that the Medici are now in a position to try the same thing.

=== Defense and military (Chapters 12–14) ===
Having discussed the various types of principalities, Machiavelli turns to the ways a state can attack other territories or defend itself. The two most essential foundations for any state, whether old or new, are sound laws and strong military forces. A self-sufficient prince is one who can meet any enemy on the battlefield. He should be "armed" with his own arms. However, a prince that relies solely on fortifications or on the help of others and stands on the defensive is not self-sufficient. If he cannot raise a formidable army, but must rely on defense, he must fortify his city. A well-fortified city is unlikely to be attacked, and if it is, most armies cannot endure an extended siege. However, during a siege a virtuous prince will keep the morale of his subjects high while removing all dissenters. Thus, as long as the city is properly defended and has enough supplies, a wise prince can withstand any siege.

Machiavelli stands strongly against the use of mercenaries, and in this he was innovative, and he also had personal experience in Florence. He believes they are useless to a ruler because they are undisciplined, cowardly, and without any loyalty, being motivated only by money. Machiavelli attributes the Italian city states' weakness to their reliance on mercenary armies.

Machiavelli also warns against using auxiliary forces, troops borrowed from an ally, because if they win, the employer is under their favor and if they lose, he is ruined. Auxiliary forces are more dangerous than mercenary forces because they are united and controlled by capable leaders who may turn against the employer.

The main concern for a prince should be war, or the preparation thereof, not books. Through war a hereditary prince maintains his power or a private citizen rises to power. Machiavelli advises that a prince must frequently hunt in order to keep his body fit and learn the landscape surrounding his kingdom. Through this, he can best learn how to protect his territory and advance upon others. For intellectual strength, he is advised to study great military men so he may imitate their successes and avoid their mistakes. A prince who is diligent in times of peace will be ready in times of adversity. Machiavelli writes, "thus, when fortune turns against him he will be prepared to resist it."

=== The Qualities of a Prince (Chapters 14–19) ===
Each of the following chapters presents a discussion about a particular virtue or vice that a prince might have, and is therefore structured in a way which appears like traditional advice for a prince. However, the advice is far from traditional.

==== A Prince's Duty Concerning Military Matters (Chapter 14) ====
Machiavelli believes that a prince's main focus should be on perfecting the art of war. He believes that by taking this profession an aspiring prince will be able to acquire a state, and will be able to maintain what he has gained. He claims that "being disarmed makes you despised." He believes that the only way to ensure loyalty from one's soldiers is to understand military matters. The two activities Machiavelli recommends practicing to prepare for war are physical and mental. Physically, he believes rulers should learn the landscape of their territories. Mentally, he encouraged the study of past military events. He also warns against idleness.

==== Reputation of a prince (Chapter 15) ====
Because, says Machiavelli, he wants to write something useful to those who understand, he thought it more fitting "to go directly to the effectual truth ("verità effettuale") of the thing than to the imagination of it". Machiavelli reasons that since princes come across men who are evil, he should learn how to be equally evil himself, and use this ability or not according to necessity. Concerning the behavior of a prince toward his subjects, Machiavelli announces that he will depart from what other writers say, and writes:

Men have imagined republics and principalities that never really existed at all. Yet the way men live is so far removed from the way they ought to live that anyone who abandons what is for what should be pursues his downfall rather than his preservation; for a man who strives after goodness in all his acts is sure to come to ruin, since there are so many men who are not good.

Since there are many possible qualities that a prince can be said to possess, he must not be overly concerned about having all the good ones. Also, a prince may be perceived to be merciful, faithful, humane, frank, and religious, but most important is only to seem to have these qualities. A prince cannot truly have these qualities because at times it is necessary to act against them. Although a bad reputation should be avoided, it is sometimes necessary to have one. In fact, he must sometimes deliberately choose evil:

He who neglects what is done for what ought to be done, sooner effects his ruin than his preservation.

In contrast with—and in opposition to—Plato and Aristotle, Machiavelli insisted that "imaginary republics and principalities" i.e. the realization of the best political regime is not possible.

==== Generosity vs. parsimony (Chapter 16) ====
If a prince is overly generous to his subjects, Machiavelli asserts he will not be appreciated, and will only cause greed for more. Additionally, being overly generous is not economical, because eventually all resources will be exhausted. This results in higher taxes, and will bring grief upon the prince. Then, if he decides to discontinue or limit his generosity, he will be labeled as a miser. Thus, Machiavelli summarizes that guarding against the people's hatred is more important than building up a reputation for generosity. A wise prince should be willing to be more reputed a miser than be hated for trying to be too generous.

On the other hand: "of what is not yours or your subjects' one can be a bigger giver, as were Cyrus, Caesar, and Alexander, because spending what is someone else's does not take reputation from you but adds it to you; only spending your own hurts you".

==== Cruelty vs. mercy (Chapter 17) ====
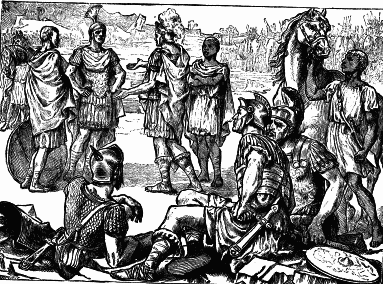
Hannibal meeting Scipio Africanus. Machiavelli describes Hannibal as having the "virtue" of "inhuman cruelty". But he lost to someone, Scipio Africanus, who showed the weakness of "excessive mercy" and who could therefore only have held power in a republic.

Machiavelli begins this chapter by addressing how mercy can be misused which will harm the prince and his dominion. He ends by stating that a prince should not shrink from being cruel if it means that it will keep his subjects in line. After all, it will help him maintain his rule. He gives the example of Cesare Borgia, whose cruelty protected him from rebellions. He compares this example with the leaders of Florence, who, through too much mercy, allowed the city of Pistoia to destroy itself.

In addressing the question of whether it is better to be loved or feared, Machiavelli writes, "The answer is that one would like to be both the one and the other; but because it is difficult to combine them, it is far safer to be feared than loved if you cannot be both." As Machiavelli asserts, commitments made in peace are not always kept in adversity; however, commitments made in fear are kept out of fear. Yet, a prince must ensure that he is not feared to the point of hatred. His justification is due to the fact that "worry less about doing an injury to one who makes himself loved than to one who makes himself feared." Fear is used as a means to ensure obedience from his subjects, and security for the prince. Above all, Machiavelli argues, a prince should not interfere with the property of their subjects or their women, and if they should try to kill someone, they should do it with a convenient justification.

Regarding the troops of the prince, fear is absolutely necessary to keep a large garrison united and a prince should not mind the thought of cruelty in that regard. For a prince who leads his own army, it is imperative for him to observe cruelty because that is the only way he can command his soldiers' absolute respect. Machiavelli compares two great military leaders: Hannibal and Scipio Africanus. Although Hannibal's army consisted of men of various races, they were never rebellious because they feared their leader. Machiavelli says this required "inhuman cruelty" which he refers to as a virtue. Scipio's men, on the other hand, were known for their mutiny and dissension, due to Scipio's "excessive mercy" – which was, however, a source of glory because he lived in a republic.

Clifford Orwin states that Machiavelli "lays the foundations" for all modern societies in deciding when to be merciful or use cruelty against transgressors.

==== In what way princes should keep their word (Chapter 18) ====
Machiavelli notes that a prince is praised for keeping his word. However, he also notes that in reality, the most cunning princes succeed politically. A prince, therefore, should only keep his word when it suits his purposes, but do his utmost to maintain the illusion that he does keep his word and that he is reliable in that regard. Machiavelli advises the ruler to become a "great liar and deceiver", and that men are so easy to deceive, that the ruler won't have an issue with lying to others. He justifies this by saying that men are wicked, and never keep their words, therefore the ruler doesn't have to keep his.

As Machiavelli notes, "He should appear to be compassionate, faithful to his word, guileless, and devout. And indeed he should be so. But his disposition should be such that, if he needs to be the opposite, he knows how." As noted in chapter 15, the prince must appear to be virtuous in order to hide his actions, and he should be able to be otherwise when the time calls for it; that includes being able to lie, though however much he lies he should always keep the appearance of being truthful.

In this chapter, Machiavelli uses "beasts" as a metaphor for unscrupulous behavior. He states that while lawful conduct is part of the nature of men, a prince should learn how to use the nature of both men and beasts wisely to ensure the stability of his regime. In this chapter however, his focus is solely on the "beastly" natures. In particular, he compares the use of force to the "lion", and the use of deception to the "fox", and advises the prince to study them both. In employing this metaphor, Machiavelli subtly references De Officiis by the Roman orator and statesman Cicero, and subverts its conclusion, arguing instead that deceit is sometimes politically necessary.

==== Avoiding contempt and hatred (Chapter 19) ====
In this chapter, Machiavelli focuses on the ways that princes can avoid being hated and thus the eventual object of a conspiracy. Machiavelli divides the fears which monarchs should have into domestic and foreign fears. Machiavelli asserts that the main causes of a prince being hated is being a "usurper" of the property and wives of his subjects. Machiavelli iterates that, as such, the majority of men are content as long as they are not deprived of their property and women, and that it is rare that a man would be unafraid of death to conspire against him. Machiavelli then gives examples of Roman emperors, splitting them into two categories, those that have ruled with force and cruelty, and those who have ruled with a disdain for cruelty.

Machiavelli suddenly goes back on his rule that a prince can evade hate, as he says that he will eventually be hated by someone, so he should seek to avoid being hated by the people generally, and if that does not work, he should avoid the hatred of "the most powerful" or the military.

Roman emperors, on the other hand, had not only the majority and an ambitious minority, but also a cruel and greedy military, who created extra problems as they demanded iniquity. While a prince should avoid being hated, he will eventually be hated by someone, so he must at least avoid the hatred of the most powerful, and for the Roman emperors this included the military who demanded iniquity against the people out of their own greed. He uses Septimius Severus as a model for new rulers to emulate, as he "embodied both the fox and the lion". Severus deceived and killed his military rivals, and although he oppressed the people, Machiavelli says that he kept the common people "satisfied and stupified".

Machiavelli notes that in his time only the Turkish empire had the problem of the Romans, because in other lands the people had become more powerful than the military.

=== The Prudence of the Prince (Chapters 20–25) ===
==== Whether ruling conquests with fortresses works (Chapter 20) ====
Machiavelli mentions that placing fortresses in conquered territories, although it sometimes works, often fails. Using fortresses can be a good plan, but Machiavelli says he shall "blame anyone who, trusting in fortresses, thinks little of being hated by the people". He cited Caterina Sforza, who used a fortress to defend herself but was eventually betrayed by her people.

==== Gaining honors (Chapter 21) ====
A prince truly earns honor by completing great feats. King Ferdinand of Spain is cited by Machiavelli as an example of a monarch who gained esteem by showing his ability through great feats and who, in the name of religion, conquered many territories and kept his subjects occupied so that they had no chance to rebel. Regarding two warring states, Machiavelli asserts it is always wiser to choose a side, rather than to be neutral. Machiavelli then provides the following reasons why:

- If your allies win, you benefit whether or not you have more power than they have.
- If you are more powerful, then your allies are under your command; if your allies are stronger, they will always feel a certain obligation to you for your help.
- If your side loses, you still have an ally in the loser.

Machiavelli also notes that it is wise for a prince not to ally with a stronger force unless compelled to do so. In conclusion, the most important virtue is having the wisdom to discern what ventures will come with the most reward and then pursuing them courageously.

==== Nobles and staff (Chapter 22) ====
The selection of good servants is reflected directly upon the prince's intelligence, so if they are loyal, the prince is considered wise; however, when they are otherwise, the prince is open to adverse criticism. Machiavelli asserts that there are three "kinds of brains":

- The kind that understands things for itself – which is excellent to have.
- The kind that understands what others can understand – which is good to have.
- The kind that does not understand for itself, nor through others – which is useless to have.

If the prince does not have the first "type of brain", he should at the very least have the second type. For, as Machiavelli states, "A prince needs to have the discernment to recognize the good or bad in what another says or does even though he has no acumen himself".

==== Avoiding flatterers (Chapter 23) ====
This chapter displays a low opinion of flatterers; Machiavelli notes that "Men are so happily absorbed in their own affairs and indulge in such self-deception that it is difficult for them not to fall victim to this plague; and some efforts to protect oneself from flatterers involve the risk of becoming despised." Flatterers were seen as a great danger to a prince, because their flattery could cause him to avoid wise counsel in favor of rash action, but avoiding all advice, flattery or otherwise, was equally bad; a middle road had to be taken. A prudent prince should have a select group of wise counselors to advise him truthfully on matters all the time. All their opinions should be taken into account. Ultimately, the decision should be made by the prince and carried out absolutely. If a prince is given to changing his mind, his reputation will suffer. A prince must have the wisdom to recognize good advice from bad. Machiavelli gives a negative example in Emperor Maximilian I; Maximilian, who was secretive, never consulted others, but once he ordered his plans and met dissent, he immediately changed them.

=== Prudence and chance ===
==== Why the princes of Italy lost their states (Chapter 24) ====
After first mentioning that a new prince can quickly become as respected as a hereditary one, Machiavelli says princes in Italy who had longstanding power and lost it cannot blame bad luck, but should blame their own indolence. One "should never fall in the belief that you can find someone to pick you up". They all showed a defect of arms (already discussed) and either had a hostile populace or did not know to secure themselves against the great.

==== How Much Fortune Can Do in Human Affairs, and in What Mode It May Be Opposed (Chapter 25) ====
As pointed out by Gilbert (1938:206) it was traditional in the genre of Mirrors of Princes to mention fortune, but "Fortune pervades The Prince as she does no other similar work". Machiavelli argues that fortune is only the judge of half of our actions and that we have control over the other half with "sweat", prudence and virtue. Even more unusual, rather than simply suggesting caution as a prudent way to try to avoid the worst of bad luck, Machiavelli holds that the greatest princes in history tend to be ones who take more risks, and rise to power through their own labour, virtue, prudence, and particularly by their ability to adapt to changing circumstances.

Machiavelli even encourages risk taking as a reaction to risk. In a well-known metaphor, Machiavelli writes that "it is better to be impetuous than cautious, because fortune is a woman; and it is necessary, if one wants to hold her down, to beat her and strike her down." Gilbert (p. 217) points out that Machiavelli's friend the historian and diplomat Francesco Guicciardini expressed similar ideas about fortune.

Machiavelli compares fortune to a torrential river that cannot be easily controlled during flooding season. In periods of calm, however, people can erect dams and levees in order to minimize its impact. Fortune, Machiavelli argues, seems to strike at the places where no resistance is offered, as had recently been the case in Italy. As de Alvarez (1999:125–30) points out that what Machiavelli actually says is that Italians in his time leave things not just to fortune, but to "fortune and God". Machiavelli is indicating in this passage, as in some others in his works, that Christianity itself was making Italians helpless and lazy concerning their own politics, as if they would leave dangerous rivers uncontrolled.

==== Exhortation to Seize Italy and to Free Her from the Barbarians (Chapter 26) ====
Pope Leo X was pope at the time the book was written and a member of the Medici family. This chapter directly appeals to the Medici to use what has been summarized in order to conquer Italy using Italian armies, following the advice in the book. Gilbert (1938:222–30) showed that including such exhortation was not unusual in the genre of books full of advice for princes. Viroli places great emphasis on this chapter, stating that it supports the interpretation of Machiavelli's desire for a "redeemer" who would free Italy of its political woes. While Leo Strauss views the Exhortation as a mere cover for the imperialism covered in the book.

== Analysis ==
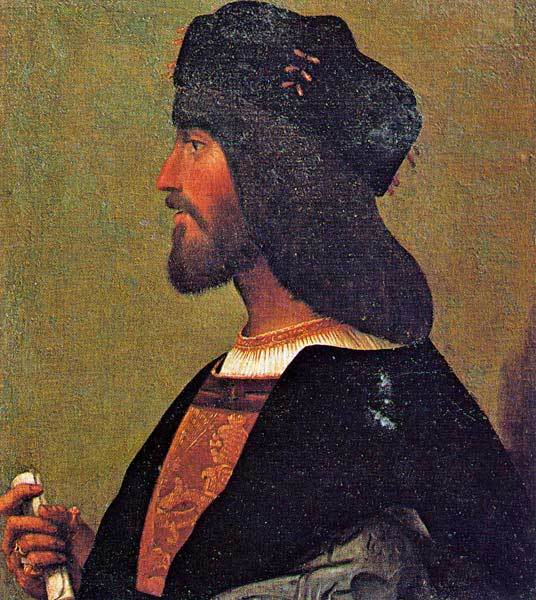
Cesare Borgia, Duke of Valentinois. According to Machiavelli, a risk taker and example of a prince who acquired by "fortune". Failed in the end because of one mistake: he was naïve to trust a new Pope.

As shown by his letter of dedication, Machiavelli's work eventually came to be dedicated to Lorenzo di Piero de' Medici, grandson of Lorenzo the Magnificent, and a member of the ruling Florentine Medici family, whose uncle Giovanni became Pope Leo X in 1513. It is known from his personal correspondence that it was written during 1513, the year after the Medici regained control of Florence, and a few months after Machiavelli's arrest, torture, and banishment by the in-coming Medici regime. It was discussed for a long time with Francesco Vettori – a friend of Machiavelli – whom he wanted to pass it and commend it to the Medici. The book had originally been intended for Giuliano di Lorenzo de' Medici, young Lorenzo's uncle, who however died in 1516. It is not certain that the work was ever read by any of the Medici before it was printed. Machiavelli describes the contents as being an un-embellished summary of his knowledge about the nature of princes and "the actions of great men", based not only on reading but also, unusually, on real experience.

The types of political behavior that are discussed with approval by Machiavelli in The Prince were regarded as shocking by contemporaries, and its immorality is still a subject of serious discussion. Even though the work advises princes how to tyrannize, Machiavelli also held free republics in high regard. Some commentators justify his acceptance of immoral and criminal actions by leaders by arguing that he lived during a time of continuous political conflict and instability in Italy, and that his influence has increased the "pleasures, equality and freedom" of many people, loosening the grip of medieval Catholicism's "classical teleology", which "disregarded not only the needs of individuals and the wants of the common man, but stifled innovation, enterprise, and enquiry into cause and effect relationships that now allow us to control nature".

On the other hand, Strauss (1958:11) notes that "even if we were forced to grant that Machiavelli was essentially a patriot or a scientist, we would not be forced to deny that he was a teacher of evil". Furthermore, Machiavelli "was too thoughtful not to know what he was doing and too generous not to admit it to his reasonable friends".

Machiavelli emphasized the need for looking at the "effectual truth" (verita effetuale), as opposed to relying on "imagined republics and principalities". He states the difference between honorable behavior and criminal behavior by using the metaphor of animals, saying that "there are two ways of contending, one in accordance with the laws, the other by force; the first of which is proper to men, the second to beast". In The Prince he does not explain what he thinks the best ethical or political goals are, except the control of one's own fortune, as opposed to waiting to see what chance brings. Machiavelli took it for granted that would-be leaders naturally aim at glory or honor. He associated these goals with a need for "virtue" and "prudence" in a leader, and saw such virtues as essential to good politics. That great men should develop and use their virtue and prudence was a traditional theme of advice to Christian princes. And that more virtue meant less reliance on chance was a classically influenced "humanist commonplace" in Machiavelli's time, as Fischer (2000:75) says, even if it was somewhat controversial. However, Machiavelli went far beyond other authors in his time, who in his opinion left things to fortune, and therefore to bad rulers, because of their Christian beliefs. He used the words "virtue" and "prudence" to refer to glory-seeking and spirited excellence of character, in strong contrast to the traditional Christian uses of those terms, but more keeping with the original pre-Christian Greek and Roman concepts from which they derived. He encouraged ambition and risk taking. So in another break with tradition, he treated not only stability, but also radical innovation, as possible aims of a prince in a political community. Managing major reforms can show off a prince's virtue and give him glory. He clearly felt Italy needed major reform in his time, and this opinion of his time is widely shared.

Machiavelli's descriptions encourage leaders to attempt to control their fortune gloriously, to the extreme extent that some situations may call for a fresh "founding" (or re-founding) of the "modes and orders" that define a community, despite the danger and necessary evil of such a project. Founding a wholly new state, or even a new religion, using evil methods has even been called the chief theme of The Prince. Machiavelli justifies this position by explaining how if "a prince did not win love he may escape hate" by personifying injustice and immorality; therefore, he will never loosen his grip since "fear is held by the apprehension of punishment" and never diminishes as time goes by. For a political theorist to do this in public was one of Machiavelli's clearest breaks not just with medieval scholasticism, but with the classical tradition of political philosophy, especially the favorite philosopher of Catholicism at the time, Aristotle. This is one of Machiavelli's most lasting influences upon modernity.

Nevertheless, Machiavelli was heavily influenced by classical pre-Christian political philosophy. According to Strauss (1958:291) Machiavelli refers to Xenophon more than Plato, Aristotle, and Cicero put together. Xenophon wrote one of the classic mirrors of princes, the Education of Cyrus. Gilbert (1938:236) wrote: "The Cyrus of Xenophon was a hero to many a literary man of the sixteenth century, but for Machiavelli he lived". Xenophon also, as Strauss pointed out, wrote a dialogue, Hiero which showed a wise man dealing sympathetically with a tyrant, coming close to what Machiavelli would do in uprooting the ideal of "the imagined prince". Xenophon however, like Plato and Aristotle, was a follower of Socrates, and his works show approval of a "teleological argument", while Machiavelli rejected such arguments. On this matter, Strauss (1958:222–23) gives evidence that Machiavelli may have seen himself as having learned something from Democritus, Epicurus and classical materialism, which was however not associated with political realism, or even any interest in politics.

On the topic of rhetoric, Machiavelli, in his introduction, stated that "I have not embellished or crammed this book with rounded periods or big, impressive words, or with any blandishment or superfluous decoration of the kind which many are in the habit of using to describe or adorn what they have produced". This has been interpreted as showing a distancing from traditional rhetoric styles, but there are echoes of classical rhetoric in several areas. In Chapter 18, for example, he uses a metaphor of a lion and a fox, examples of force and cunning; according to Zerba (2004:217), "the Roman author from whom Machiavelli in all likelihood drew the simile of the lion and the fox" was Cicero. The Rhetorica ad Herennium, a work which was believed during Machiavelli's time to have been written by Cicero, was used widely to teach rhetoric, and it is likely that Machiavelli was familiar with it. Unlike Cicero's more widely accepted works however, according to Cox (1997:1122), "Ad Herennium ... offers a model of an ethical system that not only condones the practice of force and deception but appears to regard them as habitual and indeed germane to political activity". This makes it an ideal text for Machiavelli to have used.

The Italian Marxist philosopher Antonio Gramsci argued that Machiavelli's audience for this work was not the classes who already rule (or have "hegemony") over the common people, but the common people themselves, trying to establish a new hegemony, and making Machiavelli the first "Italian Jacobin".

== Influence ==
To quote Bireley (1990:14):

...there were in circulation approximately fifteen editions of the Prince and nineteen of the Discourses and French translations of each before they were placed on the Index of Paul IV in 1559, a measure which nearly stopped publication in Catholic areas except in France. Three principal writers took the field against Machiavelli between the publication of his works and their condemnation in 1559 and again by the Tridentine Index in 1564. These were the English cardinal Reginald Pole and the Portuguese bishop Jerónimo Osório, both of whom lived for many years in Italy, and the Italian humanist and later bishop, Ambrogio Caterino Politi.

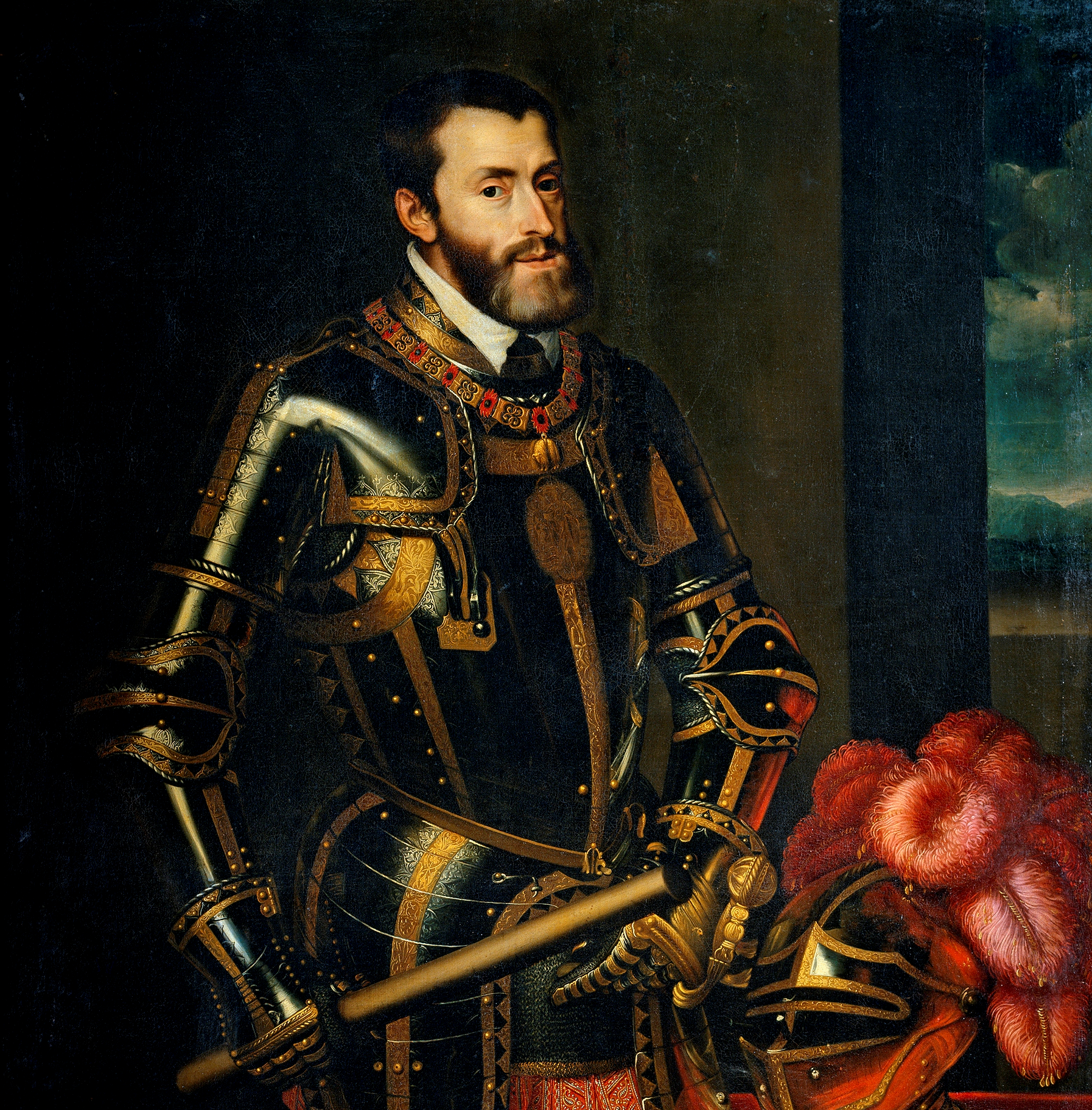
Emperor Charles V, or Charles I of Spain. A Catholic king in the first generation to read The Prince.

Henry VIII of England. A king who eventually split with the Catholic Church, and supported some Protestant ideas in the first generation to read The Prince.

Machiavelli's ideas on how to accrue honor and power as a leader had a profound impact on political leaders throughout the modern West, helped by the new technology of the printing press. Pole reported that it was spoken of highly by his enemy Thomas Cromwell in England, and had influenced Henry VIII in his turn towards Protestantism, and in his tactics, for example during the Pilgrimage of Grace. A copy was also possessed by the Catholic king and emperor Charles V. In France, after an initially mixed reaction, Machiavelli came to be associated with Catherine de Medici and the St Bartholomew's Day Massacre. As Bireley (1990:17) reports, in the 16th century, Catholic writers "associated Machiavelli with the Protestants, whereas Protestant authors saw him as Italian and Catholic". In fact, he was influencing both Catholic and Protestant kings.

One of the most important early works dedicated to criticism of Machiavelli, especially The Prince, was that of the Huguenot, Innocent Gentillet, Discourse against Machiavelli, commonly also referred to as Anti Machiavel, published in Geneva in 1576. He accused Machiavelli of being an atheist and accused politicians of his time by saying that they treated his works as the "Koran of the courtiers". Another theme of Gentillet was more in the spirit of Machiavelli himself: he questioned the effectiveness of immoral strategies (just as Machiavelli had himself done, despite also explaining how they could sometimes work). This became the theme of much future political discourse in Europe during the 17th century. This includes the Catholic Counter Reformation writers summarised by Bireley: Giovanni Botero, Justus Lipsius, Carolus Scribani, Adam Contzen, Pedro de Ribadeneira, and Diego de Saavedra Fajardo. These authors criticized Machiavelli, but also followed him in many ways. They accepted the need for a prince to be concerned with reputation, and even a need for cunning and deceit, but compared to Machiavelli, and like later modernist writers, they emphasized economic progress much more than the riskier ventures of war. These authors tended to cite Tacitus as their source for realist political advice, rather than Machiavelli, and this pretense came to be known as "Tacitism". Cardinal Reginald Pole read Il Principe while he was in Italy, and on which he commented: "I found this type of book to be written by an enemy of the human race. It explains every means whereby religion, justice and any inclination toward virtue could be destroyed".

Modern materialist philosophy developed in the 16th, 17th and 18th century, starting in the generations after Machiavelli. The importance of Machiavelli's realism was noted by many important figures in this endeavor, for example Jean Bodin, Francis Bacon, Harrington, John Milton, Spinoza, Rousseau, Hume, Edward Gibbon, and Adam Smith. Although he was not always mentioned by name as an inspiration, due to his controversy, he is also thought to have been an influence for other major philosophers, such as Montaigne, Descartes, Hobbes, Locke and Montesquieu. Due to the fame (or infamy) of his works, Machiavelli soon became a figure in the popular culture of the English stage. Machiavelli is featured as a character in the prologue of Christopher Marlowe's The Jew of Malta, and in William Shakespeare's tragic plays, such as Othello, Macbeth, and Richard III, feature characters whom are an example of the stage Machiavel, a type of character whom advances themselves politically via devious means.

The republicanism in seventeenth-century England which led to the English Civil War, the Glorious Revolution and subsequent development of the English Constitution was strongly influenced by Machiavelli's political thought. Most of the Founding Fathers of the American Revolution are known or often proposed to have been strongly influenced by Machiavelli's political works, including Benjamin Franklin, James Madison, Thomas Jefferson, Alexander Hamilton and John Adams. Also, under the guidance of Voltaire, Frederick the Great of Prussia criticised Machiavelli's conclusions in his "Anti-Machiavel", published in 1740. At different stages in his life, Napoleon I of France wrote extensive comments to The Prince. After his defeat at Waterloo, these comments were found in the emperor's coach and taken by the Prussian military. 20th century leaders also were influenced by Machiavelli. For example, Italian dictator Benito Mussolini wrote a discourse on The Prince. Soviet dictator Joseph Stalin read The Prince and annotated his own copy.

== Interpretations ==
=== Timeline of composition ===
There has been much debate of when Machiavelli actually composed The Prince (and his other works). Commentators have viewed this question to be of great importance, as some interpreters believe that Machiavelli changed his views between the composition of The Prince, and the composition of The Discourses. Hans Baron is one of such commentators who argued that Machiavelli must have changed his mind dramatically in favor of free republics, after having written The Prince. Harvey Mansfield and Nathan Tarcov, in the introduction to their translation of The Discourses on Livy, state that there are no discrepancies between The Prince and his later works, and that it "seems the safest" to see them "as a pair of works, not much different, if at all, in time of composition." Scholar William Connell views that the composition and development of The Prince was a lengthy process with his ideas being revised from 1513 to 1515. The title of the finished work, "Il Principe" differs from the original Latin title "De Principatibus" and appeared after the book was published in 1532. Scholars do not possess any existing manuscript in Machiavelli's own handwriting.

=== Other interpretations ===
Satire

This interpretation was famously put forth by scholar Garrett Mattingly (1958), who stated that "In some ways, Machiavelli's little treatise was just like all the other 'Mirrors of Princes', in other ways it was a diabolical burlesque of all of them, like a political Black Mass."

This position was taken up previously by some of the more prominent Enlightenment philosophes. Diderot speculated that it was a work designed not to mock, but to secretly expose corrupt princely rule. And in his The Social Contract, the French philosopher Jean-Jacques Rousseau said:

Machiavelli was a proper man and a good citizen; but, being attached to the court of the Medici, he could not help veiling his love of liberty in the midst of his country's oppression. The choice of his detestable hero, Cesare Borgia, clearly enough shows his hidden aim; and the contradiction between the teaching of the Prince and that of the Discourses on Livy and the History of Florence shows that this profound political thinker has so far been studied only by superficial or corrupt readers. The Court of Rome sternly prohibited his book. I can well believe it; for it is that Court it most clearly portrays.

— Social Contract, Book 3, note to Chapter 6.

However, this line of interpretation is often refuted by those who study Machiavelli's works. For example Isaiah Berlin states that he cannot find anything other than Machiavelli's work that "reads less" like a satirical piece. Maurizio Viroli writes: "In my opinion, none of these defenses of Machiavelli is valid. The view that The Prince is the "book of Republicans" comes from Rousseau's desire to rescue its author's bad reputation and make The Prince consistent with the Discourses on Livy, the text in which Machiavelli developed a comprehensive republican theory of liberty and government" and added that the claim "misrepresents the meaning of the text."

Deceit

Mary Dietz, in her essay "Trapping The Prince", writes that Machiavelli's agenda was not to be satirical, as Rousseau had argued, but instead was "offering carefully crafted advice (such as arming the people) designed to undo the ruler if taken seriously and followed." By this account, the aim was to reestablish the republic in Florence. She focuses on three categories in which Machiavelli gives paradoxical advice:

- He discourages liberality and favors deceit to guarantee support from the people. Yet Machiavelli is keenly aware of the fact that an earlier pro-republican coup had been thwarted by the people's inaction that itself stemmed from the prince's liberality.
- He supports arming the people despite the fact that he knows the Florentines are decidedly pro-democratic and would oppose the prince.
- He encourages the prince to live in the city he conquers. This opposes the Medici's habitual policy of living outside the city. It also makes it easier for rebels or a civilian militia to attack and overthrow the prince.

According to Dietz, the trap never succeeded because Lorenzo – "a suspicious prince" – never read the work of the "former republican."

However, John Scott and Vickie Sullivan believe that Dietz identified "the wrong plot" and that her investigation is "limited", not taking into account that even if Machiavelli wanted to mislead the Medici, a reinvigorated republic would not have lasted long, and also Machiavelli's recommendation for princes to emulate Cesare Borgia.

== Translations ==
- Machiavelli, Niccolò (1908), "The Prince", Translated by W.K. Marriot (1847–1927).
- Machiavelli, Niccolò (1958), "The Prince", Machiavelli: The Chief Works and Others, vol. 1. Translated by Allan Gilbert.
- Machiavelli, Niccolò (1961), The Prince, London: Penguin, ISBN 978-0-14-044915-0. Translated by George Bull.
- Machiavelli, Niccolò (1985), The Prince, University of Chicago Press. Translated by Harvey Mansfield.
- Machiavelli, Niccolò (1992), The Prince, New York: W.W. Norton & Company, ISBN 0-393-96220-2. Translated by Robert M. Adams (A Norton Critical Edition, 2nd ed., with "Backgrounds, Interpretations, Marginalia").
- Machiavelli, Niccolò (1995), The Prince, Everyman. Translated and Edited by Stephen J. Milner. Introduction, Notes and other critical apparatus by J.M. Dent.
- Machiavelli, Niccolò (2006), El Principe/The Prince: Comentado Por Napoleon Bonaparte / Commentaries by Napoleon Buonaparte, Mestas Ediciones. Translated into Spanish by Marina Massa-Carrara.
- Machiavelli, Niccolò (2009), The Prince, Penguin Classics. Translated by Tim Parks.
- Machiavelli, Niccolò (2015), The Prince with Related Documents, Bedford St. Martins. 2d rev. ed. Translated and edited by William J. Connell.

== Other works by Machiavelli ==
- The Girl from Andros
- Discourses on Livy
- The Art of War
- The Mandrake

== See also ==
- Mirrors for princes, the genre
- Secretum Secretorum, a medieval treatise also known as "Book of the science of government: on the good ordering of statecraft"
- Leviathan, a book on political realism by Thomas Hobbes

== Additional reading ==
- de Alvarez, Leo Paul S (1999), The Machiavellian Enterprise; A Commentary on The Prince
- Baron, Hans (1961), "Machiavelli : the Republican Citizen and Author of The Prince", The English Historical Review, 76: 218, archived from the original on 2010-03-25
- Bireley, Robert (1990), The Counter-Reformation Prince: Anti-Machiavellianism or Catholic Statecraft in Early Modern Europe, University of North Carolina Press, ISBN 978-0807819258
- Shklar, J. (1999). "Montesquieu and the new republicanism". In Bock, Gisela; Skinner, Quentin; Viroli, Maurizio (eds.). Machiavelli and Republicanism. Cambridge University Press.
- Connell, W. J. (2013). Dating The Prince: Beginnings and Endings. The Review of Politics, 75(4), 497–514.
- Dent, J (1995), "Introduction", The Prince and other writings, Everyman
- Fischer, Markus (2000), Well-ordered License: On the Unity of Machiavelli's Thought, Lexington Book
- Guarini, Elena (1999), "Machiavelli and the crisis of the Italian republics", in Bock, Gisela; Skinner, Quentin; Viroli, Maurizio (eds.), Machiavelli and Republicanism, Cambridge University Press
- Cox, Virginia (1997), "Machiavelli and the Rhetorica ad Herennium: Deliberative Rhetoric in The Prince", The Sixteenth Century Journal, 28 (4): 1109–41, doi:10.2307/2543571, JSTOR 2543571
- Zerba, Michelle (2004), "The Frauds of Humanism: Cicero, Machiavelli, and the Rhetoric of Imposture", Rhetorica, 22 (3): 215–40, doi:10.1525/rh.2004.22.3.215, S2CID 146374652
- Gilbert, Allan (1938), Machiavelli's Prince and Its Forerunners, Duke University Press
- Kennington, Richard (2004), On Modern Origins, Lexington Books
- Machiavelli, Niccolò (1996), Machiavelli and his Friends: Their Personal Correspondence, Northern Illinois University Press. Translated and edited by James B. Atkinson and David Sices.
- Najemy, John (1993), Between Friends: Discourses of Power and Desire in the Machiavelli-Vettori Letters of 1513–15, Princeton University Press
- Haitsma Mulier, Eco (1999), "A controversial republican", in Bock, Gisela; Skinner, Quentin; Viroli, Maurizio (eds.), Machiavelli and Republicanism, Cambridge University Press
- Rahe, Paul A. (2006), Machiavelli's Liberal Republican Legacy, Cambridge University Press, ISBN 978-0521851879 Excerpt, reviews and Text search shows Machiavelli's Discourses had a major impact on shaping conservative thought.
- Schaefer, David (1990), The Political Philosophy of Montaigne, Cornell University Press.
- Strauss, Leo (1958), Thoughts on Machiavelli, University of Chicago Press
- Strauss, Leo (1987), "Niccolo Machiavelli", in Strauss, Leo; Cropsey, Joseph (eds.), History of Political Philosophy (3rd ed.), University of Chicago Press
- Worden, Blair (1999), "Milton's republicanism and the tyranny of heaven", in Bock, Gisela; Skinner, Quentin; Viroli, Maurizio (eds.), Machiavelli and Republicanism, Cambridge University Press
- Bock, Gisela; Skinner, Quentin; Viroli, Maurizio (1990), Machiavelli and Republicanism, Cambridge University Press – excerpt and text search
- Dietz, Mary (1986), "Trapping the Prince" (PDF), American Political Science Review, 80 (3): 777–99, doi:10.2307/1960538, JSTOR 1960538, S2CID 144027726, archived from the original (PDF) on 2015-10-16
- Garver, Eugene (1980), "Machiavelli's "The Prince": A Neglected Rhetorical Classic", Philosophy & Rhetoric, 13 (2): 99–120
- Kahn, Victoria (1986), "Virtù and the Example of Agathocles in Machiavelli's Prince", Representations, 13 (13): 63–83, doi:10.2307/2928494, JSTOR 2928494
- Mattingly, Garrett (1958), "Machiavelli's Prince: Political Science or Political Satire?", The American Scholar, 27: 482–91, archived from the original on 2016-11-26
- Parsons, William B. (2016), Machiavelli's Gospel, University of Rochester Press, ISBN 9781580464918
- Tinkler, John F. (1988), "Praise and Advice: Rhetorical Approaches in More's Utopia and Machiavelli's The Prince", The Sixteenth Century Journal, 19 (2): 187–207, doi:10.2307/2540406, JSTOR 2540406
