= The Art of War (Machiavelli book) =

Treatise by Niccolò Machiavelli

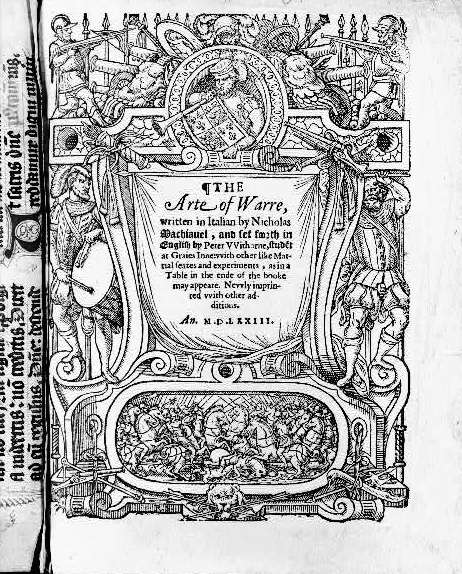
Peter Whitehorne's 1573 translation of The Art of War

The Art of War (Italian: Dell'arte della guerra) is a treatise by the Italian Renaissance political philosopher and historian Niccolò Machiavelli. Written between 1519 and 1520 and published the following year, it was Machiavelli's only historical or political work printed during his lifetime.

== Format ==
The Art of War is divided into a preface (proemio) and seven books (chapters), which take the form of a series of dialogues that take place in the Orti Oricellari, the gardens built in a classical style by Bernardo Rucellai in the 1490s for Florentine aristocrats and humanists to engage in discussion, between Cosimo Rucellai and "Lord Fabrizio Colonna" (many feel Colonna is a veiled disguise for Machiavelli himself, but this view has been challenged by scholars such as Mansfield), with other patrizi and captains of the recent Florentine republic: Zanobi Buondelmonti, Battista della Palla and Luigi Alamanni. The work is dedicated to Lorenzo di Filippo Strozzi, patrizio fiorentino in a preface which ostentatiously pronounces Machiavelli's authorship. After repeated uses of the first person singular to introduce the dialogue, Machiavelli retreats from the work, serving as neither narrator nor interlocutor.

Fabrizio dominates the discussions with his knowledge of affairs of war and military conduct. Fabrizio positions himself not only as an expert in the art of war but as a founder of a new form of military thinking, inspired by classical theory.

Machiavelli views the art of war to be of the highest importance of statesmen, believing that such knowledge of fighting wars can enable leaders of nations to acquire empire. He promises great glory to those who take up the task of founding great military orders in their states. (Note: In the section, "War and Politics") Yves Winter stated that the Art of War can be best viewed as a criticism of "humanist grandstanding" and a further elaboration of Machiavelli's call in Chapter 26 of The Prince to form a new political-military order that can free Italy from "barbarian domination". Mansfield asserts that the work employs too much irony to be "a serious study in the usual sense", but it establishes and promotes "the serious study of war" in the modern era.

== Background ==
Machiavelli's Art of War echoes many themes, issues, ideas and proposals from his earlier, more widely read works, The Prince and The Discourses. Machiavelli had served for fourteen years as secretary to the Chancery of Florence and "personally observed and reported back to his government on the size, composition, weaponry, morale, and logistical capabilities of the most effective militaries of his day." However, the native fighting force he assiduously oversaw was struck a catastrophic defeat in Prato in 1512 which led to the downfall of the Florentine republican government.

== Critique ==
Machiavelli's basic notion of emulating Roman practices was slowly and pragmatically adapted by many later rulers and commanders, most notably Maurice of Nassau and Gustavus Adolphus of Sweden.

In the course of the sixteenth century twenty-one editions appeared and it was translated into French, English, German, and Latin. Montaigne named Machiavelli next to Caesar, Polybius, and Commynes as an authority on military affairs. Although in the seventeenth century changing military methods brought other writers to the fore, Machiavelli was still frequently quoted. In the eighteenth century, the Marshal de Saxe leaned heavily on him when he composed his Reveries upon the Art of War (1757), and Algarotti—though without much basis—saw in Machiavelli the master who has taught Frederick the Great the tactics by which he astounded Europe. Like most people concerned with military matters, Jefferson had Machiavelli's Art of War in his library, and when the War of 1812 increased American interest in problems of war, The Art of War was brought out in a special American edition."

== Themes ==
In the opening pages, after Cosimo has described his grandfather's inspiration for gardens in which the conversations are set, Fabrizio declaims that we should imitate ancient warfare rather than ancient art forms. However, the Art of War is a dialogue in the humanist tradition of imitating classical forms. Machiavelli himself appears to have fallen into the trap for which Fabrizio criticizes Bernardo Rucellai. Despite this inherent contradiction, the book lacks much of the cynical tone and humour that is so characteristic of Machiavelli's other works.
