= George Bull (journalist) =

English translator, author and journalist (1929–2001)

George Bull OBE KCSG FRSL
- Born: George Anthony Bull; 23 August 1929; London
- Died: 6 April 2001 (aged 71); London
- Education: History MA(Oxon)
- Occupations: Author, journalist, translator
- Notable credit(s): Financial Times, World News, Director, Inside Japan, International Minds
- Spouse: Doreen Griffin (m. 1957)
- Children: 4

George Anthony Bull OBE KCSG FRSL (23 August 1929 – 6 April 2001) was an English translator, author and journalist.

== Education ==
Bull attended Wimbledon College in Wimbledon, London before reading History at Brasenose College, Oxford.

== Career ==
=== Journalism ===
Bull worked for the Financial Times, McGraw-Hill World News and for Director magazine, where he was editor-in-chief until 1984. He was appointed the director of the Anglo-Japanese Economic Institute in 1986. He was a director of Central Banking Publications in addition to being the founder and publisher of the quarterly publications Inside Japan and International Minds.

=== Translations ===
He translated six volumes for the Penguin Classics series: Benvenuto Cellini's Autobiography (1956), The Book of the Courtier by Castiglione (1967), Lives of the Artists by Giorgio Vasari (two volumes, 1987), The Prince by Niccolò Machiavelli (1961), and Pietro Aretino's Selected Letters (1976). His translation of The Prince, although discontinued by Penguin, continues to be lauded as the "most stylistically elegant" in English.

He was consultant editor to Penguin Business Series.

=== Authorship ===
His other books include Vatican Politics; Bid for Power (with Anthony Vice), a history of take-over bids; Renaissance Italy, a book for children; Venice: The Most Triumphant City, Inside the Vatican, and Michelangelo: A Biography.

== Honours ==
Bull was elected a Fellow of the Royal Society of Literature in 1981 and a vice president of the British-Italian Society in 1994. He was awarded an OBE in 1990. Hel was made Knight Commander of the Order of St Gregory in 1999, and was awarded the Order of the Sacred Treasure, Gold rays with Neck Ribbon (Japan) in 1999.

== Personal life ==
George was survived by his wife, Doreen (née Griffin), and their four children, Catherine, Julian, Jennifer, and Simon.
