= Anti-Machiavel =

Essay by Frederick the Great

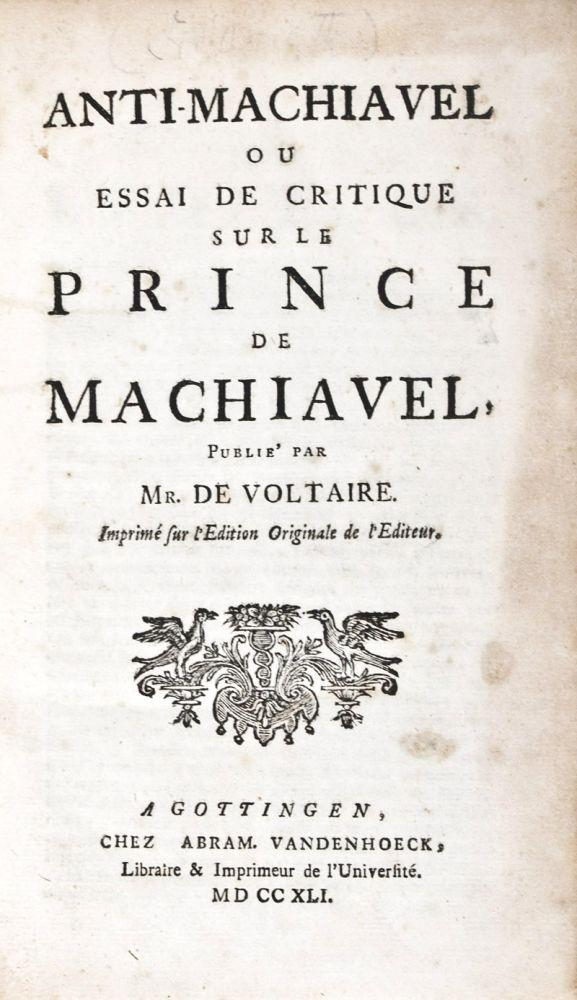
1740

Anti-Machiavel is an 18th-century essay by Frederick the Great, King of Prussia and patron of Voltaire, consisting of a chapter-by-chapter rebuttal of The Prince, the 16th-century book by Niccolò Machiavelli. It was first published in September 1740, a few months after Frederick became king.

== Composition and publication ==
The work, written in French, was produced at a turning point in Frederick's life, after his turbulent and rebellious youth, and immediately before his assumption of the throne of Prussia. Frederick had, of course, read Machiavelli long before; it is not exactly clear what drew his attention to this subject in the late 1730s, although his affiliation with Voltaire and his impending change in rank most certainly contributed to the project. It is known from letters to Voltaire that Frederick began to ruminate on the project early in 1738; his draft of the brief work was completed by the end of 1739.

Voltaire took over in Summer 1740. Living in Huis Honselaarsdijk, the Prussian residence near The Hague, and working with a dubious printer named Jan van Duren, Voltaire revised the text extensively on purpose and in order to get the manuscript back. There was also a combined edition, with Voltaire's emendations as footnotes.

Frederick sent Francesco Algarotti to London to take care of the publication of Anti-Machiavel in English. In the meantime, Frederick had become king, and his authorship — which was a very open secret — made the book an instant success and bestseller. Not surprisingly, Frederick had other matters to occupy his attention, and he did not return to the work in an appreciable way.

== Argument ==
Frederick's argument is essentially moral in nature: he asserts that Machiavelli offered a partial and biased view of statecraft. His own views appear to reflect a largely Enlightenment ideal of rational and benevolent statesmanship: the king, Frederick contends, is charged with maintaining the health and prosperity of his subjects. On the one hand, then, Machiavelli erred by assigning too great a value on princely machinations that, Frederick claims, ended in disaster, as the king's evil actions are taken up by his subjects. On the other hand, and in support of the first idea, Frederick points out the numerous cases in which Machiavelli had ignored or slighted the bad ends of the numerous malefactors he describes and praises.

== Sources ==
- Anti-Machiavel, of oordeelkundig onderzoek, van den Vorst, van Machiavel ... by Frederick II, Voltaire, H. Zweerts. Dutch translation from 1741
- Thomas Carlyle (1865). History of Friedrich II of Prussia, Book 10. Project Gutenberg. March, 2000.
