= Discourses on Livy =

Work of political history and philosophy by Machiavelli (c. 1517)

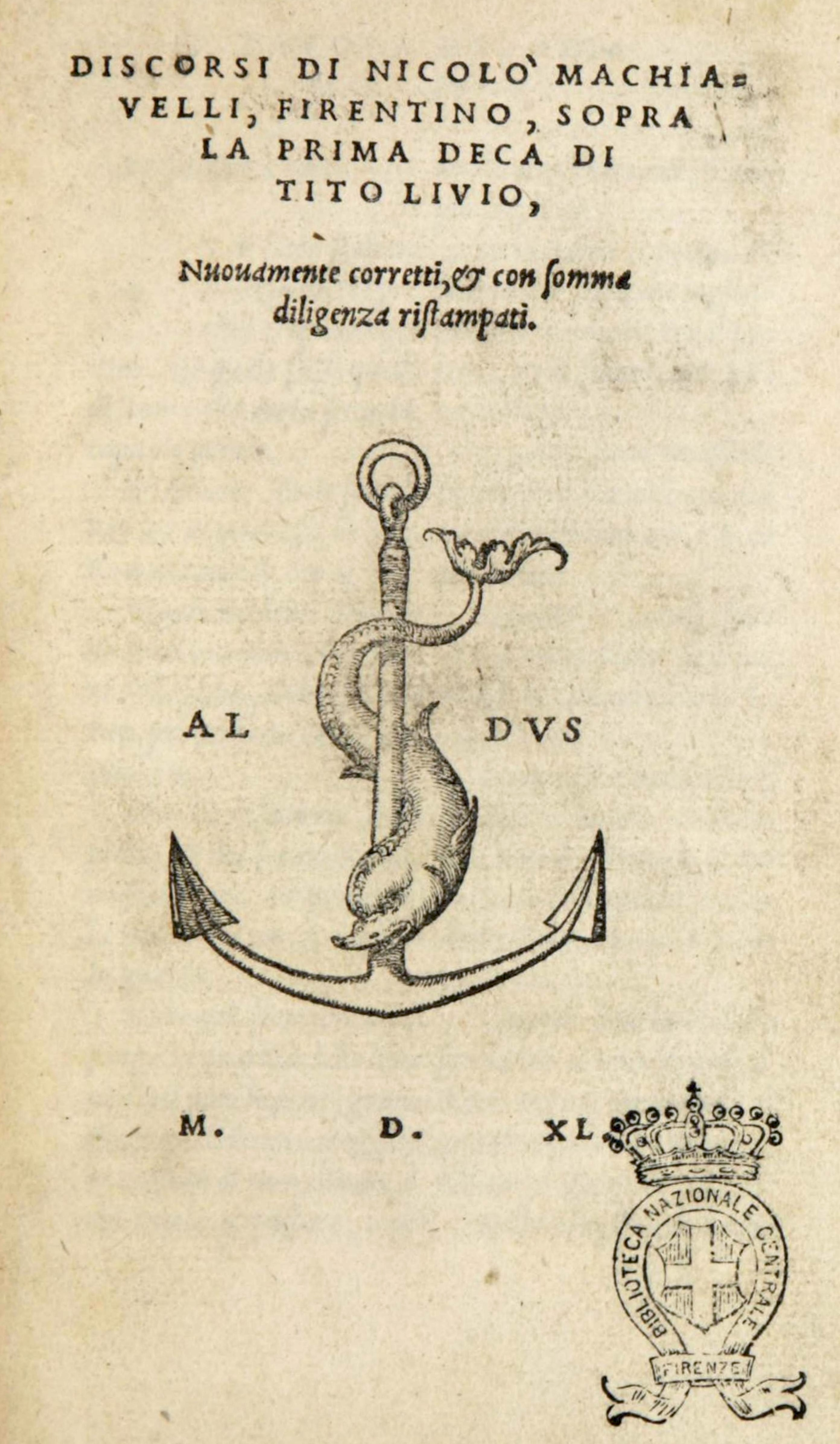
- Title page of the 1540 edition
- Author: Niccolò Machiavelli
- Original title: Discorsi sopra la prima deca di Tito Livio
- Language: Italian
- Subject: Political history
- Publisher: Aldine Press
- Publication date: 1531
- Publication place: Italy
- Text: Discourses on Livy at Wikisource

The Discourses on Livy (Italian: Discorsi sopra la prima deca di Tito Livio, lit. 'Discourses on the First Ten of Titus Livy') is a work of political history and philosophy written in the early 16th century (c. 1517) by the Florentine political theorist Niccolò Machiavelli, best known as the author of The Prince. The Discourses were published posthumously with papal privilege in 1531.

The title identifies the work's subject as the first ten books of Livy's History of Rome, also known as Ab urbe condita, which relate the expansion of Rome through the end of the Third Samnite War in 293 BC, although Machiavelli discusses what can be learned from many other eras including contemporary politics. Machiavelli saw history in general as a way to learn useful lessons from the past for the present, and also as a type of analysis which could be built upon, as long as each generation did not forget the works of the past.

Machiavelli frequently describes Romans and other ancient peoples as superior models for his contemporaries, but he also describes political greatness as something which comes and goes amongst peoples, in cycles.

== Outline ==
Discourses on Livy comprises a dedication letter and three books with a total of 142 numbered chapters. The first two books, but not the third, are introduced by unnumbered prefaces. Much attention has been given to the fact that Livy's History also contained 142 books along with an introduction, as well as to other numerological curiosities present in Machiavelli's writings. At the end of chapter one of Book I, Machiavelli outlines the structure of his work. In Livy's History, Machiavelli observes that Rome's actions are divided into two dichotomies: those taken through public counsel or private counsel, and those occurring either inside or outside the city. The first book focuses on actions taken inside the city by public counsel. The second book, as Machiavelli later notes at the end of the second preface, addresses public counsel regarding matters outside the city. Although this structure would seem to suggest the need for two additional books, there is only one more, which deals with private counsel concerning both internal and external matters.

=== Dedicatory letter ===
Machiavelli dedicates the Discourses to two friends, Zanobi Buondelmonti and Cosimo Rucellai, both of whom appear in Machiavelli's Art of War. Rucellai had died in 1519, but this did not lead Machiavelli to find a new dedicatee, as he had with The Prince. Machiavelli justifies dedicating the Discourses to his two friends because they deserve to be princes, even if they lack principalities, and he criticizes the custom (which he had adopted in The Prince) of dedicating works to men who are princes but do not deserve to be.

=== Book I ===
Machiavelli notes that Rome's actions as recounted by Livy proceeded either by "public counsel" or by "private counsel", and that they concerned either things inside the city or things outside the city, yielding four possible combinations. He says that he will restrict himself in Book I to those things that occurred inside the city and by public counsel.

In the preface to Book I, Machiavelli explains why he wrote the Discourse, noting that he brings new modes and orders—a dangerous task given the envy of men, but one motivated by the desire to work for the common benefit of humanity. He also notes that while his work may not be perfect, it deserves to be heard, because it will aid others after him in fulfilling his vision. He complains that the Italian Renaissance has stimulated a desire to imitate the ancients in art, law, and medicine, but that no one thinks of imitating ancient kingdoms or republics. He traces this to an improper reading of history that suggests that imitation of ancient political virtue is impossible. He declares his intention to overcome this view of the ancient world by examining Livy and modern politics.

==== Types of governments and rulers ====
Book I begins by explaining how a city is formed, which is done either by natives to the area or by foreigners, citing specific examples such as Athens and Venice. Machiavelli then explains this idea and states that this greatly changes the way a city is viewed, in particular for Rome. He states that there are six main different types of government, three of which are good, but "no precaution will prevent it from slipping into its opposite, so closely are the virtues and vices of the two related." Namely, monarchy, aristocracy, and democracy will become tyranny, oligarchy, and anarchy, respectively. Machiavelli then tries to determine what type of government Rome was; he says it was a republic, mixing all three functional political systems together, which kept the violent tendencies of one another in check.

Machiavelli then delves into more historical events. Once the Tarquins left Rome there seemed to be peace and alliance between the patricians and the plebs, but this in fact was untrue. This disunity resulted in Rome evolving into a Republic. Moving on, he says that a republic has the opportunity to emerge as an empire, like Rome, or just maintain what it is. Also, allowing people to accuse other citizens is necessary in creating a republic, but calumnies, whispered allegations that cannot be proven or disproven in a court, are harmful because they cause mistrust and help create factionalism.

Machiavelli then goes into how a founder of a republic must "act alone" and gain absolute power to form a lasting regime. He cites Romulus's murder of his own brother Remus and co-ruler Titus Tatius in order to gain power. Machiavelli then excuses Romulus for his crimes, saying he acted for the common good in bringing "civil life" in Rome's founding.

Machiavelli ranks then which rulers are most praiseworthy, the first of which being leaders who lead due to religion, then those who lead because they created a republic or kingdom. Religion in Rome was cited as a primary cause for joy in the city as it is truly an important element. He also states that Livy gives many examples of when religion was utilized to restructure the city. He says Numa Pompilius was more important to Rome than Romulus for bringing the kingdom to arms by using religion. While Machiavelli believes that religion is absolutely necessary for maintaining a government, he also believes in the power and influence of fortune, without which the Roman government would have never broken from the cycle of government demonstrated by Polybius. Fortune acts similarly to the activity of gods, yet it is different in that it exists naturally and benefits those who demonstrate virtue. He criticizes the Catholic Church's ineffectiveness in unifying Italy, writing:

... the Church has kept and still keeps this [country] of ours divided, and truly no country was ever united or happy, except when it gave its obedience entirely to one Republic or Prince, as has happened to France and Spain. And the reason ... is solely the Church, for having acquired and held temporal Empire; she has not been so powerful or of such virtue that she was able to seize the tyranny of Italy and make herself its Prince.

The Samnites were defeated by the Romans several times, and in order to change this they decided to find a new approach to their religion.

==== On corruption and reform ====
Machiavelli speaks on corruption, and how hard it is to sustain a republic where it has recently been freed from monarchy. He says that to sustain a republic in a newly freed city, it is necessary to "Kill the sons of Brutus" (referring to Lucius Junius Brutus's execution of his own sons), that is make violent examples out of the enemies of the free regime. He also gives similar advice to "princes who have become tyrants of their fatherlands". Machiavelli then states that to keep a corrupt republic free, it is necessary to use extraordinary means, and bring the state under an "almost kingly power".

Discussing the subject of restoring freedom, Machiavelli explains that freedom becomes an issue once a type of government shifts. He explains that the Romans were not corrupt when they regained their freedom and could thus keep it. Questioning what mode a free state can be maintained in a corrupt city, he states that Rome had orders, which kept the citizens checked.

He then goes into a discussion of the rulers of Rome and how a strong or weak Prince can maintain or destroy a kingdom. He continues to say that after a weak prince a kingdom could not remain strong with another weak prince. Luckily, the first three kings each had a certain strength, which aided the city. Romulus was fierce, Numa was religious, and Tullus was dedicated to war.

The book then slightly shifts focus to discussing the reformation of a state. Machiavelli explains that if one wants to change a state they must keep some elements of the previous state. Also, he says that a Prince or republic should not deny citizens necessities. He then conveys that having a dictatorial authority was beneficial for the City of Rome because a republic cannot always make the quick decisions demanded by a crisis, and in these cases one person can do a better job than the rest. Rome benefited because the office of Dictator was written into the constitution so it could be exercised legitimately and then retired during the emergency. Continuing with this, weak republics are not truly able to make important decisions and that any change will come from necessity.

He also goes into a discussion about how to establish and maintain a tyrannical government, using the example of Appius Claudius, an individual who was unwise in approaching this endeavor. He states that those who are successful in establishing absolutist regimes attack the nobles by appealing to the people, then oppress the people when all of their enemies are eliminated.

The themes of pride and corruption appear many times throughout The Discourses and Machiavelli believes that it is very easy for a person to be corrupted. It is also good for a soldier to have the desire to fight for personal pride and glory.

Towards the end of Book I, Machiavelli adds that great accidents that occur in a city usually come with some kind of sign. This sign could be divine or seen through a revelation. He gives the particular example that in Florence, right before the death of Lorenzo de' Medici the Elder, a cathedral was hit by lightning. Machiavelli explains that Livy stated that people are strong together, but weak when alone, citing the example of the Roman plebs. Machiavelli feels that the multitude is wiser than the one prince. Thus, Book I examines a variety of issues that occur when creating a state, and looks at it with specific examples from Rome and other parts of Italy.

=== Book II ===
Chapter 1 debates whether Virtue or Fortune had more of a cause of the empire that the Romans acquired. There were many opinions equally distributed to both sides, and there is not final consensus on which had more of a cause, virtue or fortune.

Chapter 2 discusses what people the Romans had to combat, and that they obstinately defended their freedom. In this chapter he also goes into why he thinks that republics are better than principalities.

Chapter 3 talks about how Rome had its rise to power through their ruining of surrounding cities, making Rome the primary power of the region.

Chapter 4 lists the three modes of expanding that republics have taken. Also, Machiavelli gives the reasoning and background information for why these three modes of expanding that the republic took were necessary.

Chapter 5 talks about how memories can be lost due to issues such as language barriers, floods, or even plague.

Chapter 6 talks about how the Romans went about making war. He claims that their goal for war was to be short and massive.

Chapter 7 talks about how much land the Romans gave per Colonist. He claims that this would be tough to determine because it depended on the places where they sent the colonists.

Chapter 8 discusses the cause why peoples leave their ancestral places and inundate the country of others. He blames it either on famine or on war that has taken over their land and they must move on to something new.

Chapter 9 he talks about what factors commonly cause wars. He says there are many different reasons for disputes.

Chapter 10 talks about how the common opinion of money being the sinew of war is actually incorrect. Faith and benevolence of men is what makes war what it is.

Chapter 11 talks about the idea that becoming friends with a prince who has more reputation than force is not something that would go unnoticed. People were looking for good connections, and the prince who has a better reputation is better off than the one with better force.

Chapter 12 talks about whether it is better to wait to be attacked if you feel it is coming, or if you should make the first move.

Chapter 13 talks about how a person comes from base to great fortune more through fraud than through force. He thinks that fraud makes it quicker and easier for a person to succeed, so force is not needed as much.

Chapter 14 talks about how men confuse themselves into believing that through humility, they will conquer pride. Claims that humility and pride are two separate things and do not go hand in hand.

Chapter 15 claims that the resolutions of weak states will always be ambiguous, and that slow decisions, no matter who or what is making them, are always hurtful.

Chapter 16 talks about how much the soldiers of his time did not conform to the ancient orders. Values and ideologies were being lost, and soldiers just were not the same as they used to be.

Chapter 17 talks about how much artillery should be esteemed by armies in the present times, and whether the opinion universally held of it is true. Many different opinions are voiced in the chapter, and each has a valid argument to go along with it.

Chapter 18 talks about how the Authority of the Romans and by the example of the ancient military infantry should be esteemed more than the horse. Claimed that the military esteemed the military on foot much more than military on horseback.

Chapter 19 talks about how the acquisitions by Republics that are not well ordered and that do not proceed according to Roman virtue are for their ruin, not their exaltation. Chapter talks in detail about the different outlooks people have.

Chapter 20 talks about and asks what danger the prince or republic runs that avails itself of Auxiliary or mercenary military. Says that having these services admits you are weak and is not something that is necessarily respectable.

Chapter 21 says the first praetor the Romans sent anyplace was to Capua, four hundred years after they began making war. Claims that the Romans were changing things and were acting differently from past precedents.

Chapter 22 talks about how false the opinions of men often are in judging great things. Says that the best men are treated poorly during the quiet times because of envy or from other ambitions.

Chapter 23 talks about how much the Romans, in judging subjects for some accidents that necessitated such judgment, fled from the middle way (which he criticizes) in regards to punishments.

Chapter 24 claims that fortresses are generally much more harmful than useful. They did not build fortresses to protect them because they were of another virtue to that of building them.

Chapter 25 says to assault a disunited city so as to seize it by means of its disunion is a contradictory policy.

Chapter 26 claims vilification and abuse generate hatred against those who use them, without any utility to them. He is saying that the abuse that men do to women is something that brings hatred not only from the victim, but from everyone who hears about it as well.

Chapter 27 says for prudent princes and republics, it should be enough to conquer, for most often when it is not enough, one loses. He is saying that people should be happy with what they get, because if they try to get more than they can handle, they end up losing it all.

Chapter 28 says how dangerous it is for a republic or a prince not to avenge an injury done against the public or against a private person.

Chapter 29 claims that fortune blinds the spirits of men when it does not wish them to oppose its plans. This means that fate will take its toll on what men do and do not do.

Chapter 30 says that truly powerful republics and princes buy friendships not with money, but with virtue and reputation of strength.

Chapter 31 talks about how dangerous it is to believe the banished. He is talking about how there should be no circumstances in which someone should believe another individual who has been kicked out of the country. Clearly they did wrong, and one does not need that kind of negative influence in one's life.

Chapter 32 talks about how many modes the Romans seized towns. He talks about the different advantages to seizing towns in different ways, both weighing the pros and cons such as cost and efficiency.

Chapter 33 talks about how the Romans gave free commissions to their captains of armies. They valued these men and what they did so much that they were willing to give free commissions in order to show them how they felt about them.

=== Book III ===
Chapter 1 of Book 3 starts with a heading: "If one wishes a sect or republic to live long, it is necessary to draw it back often towards its beginning." Machiavelli admits that "all worldly things" have a natural ending. If any of these worldly things are altered and changed from its normal course, "it is for its safety and not to its harm." Machiavelli, however, desires to talk about exceptions to this rule, "...mixed bodies, such as republics and sections". For these things, "alterations are for safety that lead them back toward their beginnings." He is referring to the state of a republic when he ends the first paragraph, declaring that, "...it is a thing clearer than light that these bodies do not last if they do not renew themselves." Since a republic must be led towards its beginning, "all the beginnings of sects, republics, and kingdoms must have some goodness in them, by means of which they must regain their reputation and their first increase." If that goodness is ever corrupted, "unless something intervenes to lead it back to the mark, it of necessary kills that body." This return toward the beginning is done either through prudence from outside of the republic or from within the republic. Machiavelli cites an example from Roman history: when the Gauls, referring to them as the French, sacked Rome in 387 BC. He believes that the Gauls' aggression was necessary, "if one wished that that it be reborn and, by being reborn, regain new life and new virtue, and regain the observance of religion and justice, which were beginning to be tainted in it." He refers to the period before the sacking, when the Roman tribunes were given consular power and "they did not observe any religious ceremony." Romans had lost sight of "the other good institutions ordered by Romulus and by other prudent princes than was reasonable and necessary to maintain their free way of life." In Machiavelli's opinion, the sacking of Rome was deserved since the Romans had lost sight of all the things their forefathers had told them to follow. Machiavelli, in fact, refers to Gaul's attack on Rome as an "external beating". The usage of that phrase puts the event in a punitive light, as if Rome is a disobedient child being beat back into shape. This event was necessary "so that all the orders of the city might be regained and that it might be shown to that people that it was necessary not only to maintain religion and justice but also to esteem its good citizens and to take more account of their virtue than of these advantages that it appeared to them they lacked through their works." According to Machiavelli, "this good emerges in republics either through the virtue of a man or through the virtue of an order." Later on Machiavelli states that it is not preferable to have renewal carried out by an external force as "it is so dangerous that it is not in any way to be desired." In the Roman Republic, "the orders that drew the Roman republic back toward its beginning were the tribunes of the plebs, the censors, and all the other laws that went against the ambition and the insolence of men." Before the taking of Rome by the Gauls, the executions of such famous Romans as "the sons of Brutus" or "that of Maelius the grain dealer", because they were "excessive and notable" drew Romans back from any dangerous or tumultuous behavior. Machiavelli reasons that "Unless something arises by which punishment is brought back to their memory and fear is renewed in their spirits, soon so many delinquents join together that they can no longer be punished without danger." He relates this to his native Florence, where "from 1434 up to 1494", such things were done "to regain the state...otherwise, it was difficult to maintain it." Machiavelli then asserts that "this drawing back of republics toward their beginning arises also from the simple virtue of one man, without depending on any law law that stimulates you to any execution." He gives examples of particularly great Romans like Horatius Coclus and Gaius Mucius Scaevola who were "of such reputation and so much example that good men desire to imitate them and the wicked are ashamed to hold a life contrary to them." Machiavelli venerates these Romans much like their countrymen did. Machiavelli then turns his attention toward the renewal of sects, arguing that "...our religion, which would be altogether eliminated if it had not been drawn back toward its beginning by Saint Francis and Saint Dominick." "For with poverty and with the example of the life of Christ they brought back into the minds of men what had already been eliminated there."

Machiavelli begins Chapter 2 declaring that, "There was never anyone so prudent nor esteemed so wise for any eminent work of his than Junius Brutus deserves to be held in his simulation of stupidity." He is referring to the way in which Brutus removed the Tarquins from Rome "to live more securely and to maintain his patrimony..." Machiavelli believes that "From his example all those who are discontented with a prince have to learn: they should first measure and first weigh their forces, and if they are so powerful that they can expose themselves as his enemies and make war on him openly, they should enter on this way, as less dangerous and more honorable. But if they are such quality that their forces are not enough for making open war, they should seek with all industry to make themselves friends to him..." Machiavelli describes a middle path where you can enjoy the fortunes of the prince you have become familiar with, but not fall into ruin should he encounter it; one keeps his distance but also quite close. Machiavelli believes this to be impossible, however, stating that "one must be reduced to the two modes written above—that is, either distance oneself from or to bind oneself to them. Whoever does otherwise, if he is a man notable for his quality, lives in continual danger." Machiavelli concludes the chapter, writing, "Thus one must play crazy, like Brutus, and make oneself very much mad, praising, speaking, seeing, doing things against your intent so as to please the prince."

The heading for Chapter 3 states "That it is necessary to kill the sons of Brutus if one wishes to maintain a newly acquired freedom." He refers to the episode where Brutus sentenced his own sons to death when they entered into a plot to restore the Tarquin dynasty, Machiavelli writes that, "...after a change of state, either from republic to tyranny or from tyranny to republic, a memorable execution against the enemies of present conditions is necessary. Whoever takes up a tyranny and does not kill Brutus, and whoever makes a free state and does not kill the sons of Brutus, maintains himself for little time." He compares it to an event in recent Florentine history when Piero Soderini, a Florentine statesman, was appointed gonfalonier (the highest rank in Florentine government) for life. Because of his inability to crush his enemies, Soderini would eventually go into exile. Machiavelli believes that since he did not know how to act like Brutus, and eliminate those who opposed the structure of the republic, he lost "not only his fatherland, but his state and his reputation."

The heading of Chapter 4 is, "A prince does not live secure in a principality while those who have been despoiled of it are living." Machiavelli begins the chapter citing Livy: "The death of Tarquin Priscus, caused by the sons of Ancus, and the death of Servius Tullius, caused by Tarquin the Proud, show how difficult and dangerous it is to despoil one individual of the kingdom and to leave him alive, even though one might seek to win him over by compensation." This event functions as advice to future princes, "every prince can be warned that he never lives secure in his principality as long as those who have been despoiled of it are living."

The topic of Chapter 5 is "What makes a king who is heir to a kingdom lose it." Machiavelli starts the chapter relating the story of Tarquin the Proud (also known as Lucius Tarquinius Superbus), the last king of Rome, "When Tarquin the Proud had killed Servius Tullius, and there were no heirs remaining of him, he came to possess the kingdom securely, since he did not have to fear those things that had offended his predecessors. Although the mode of seizing the kingdom had been extraordinary and hateful, nonetheless, if he had observed the ancient orders of the other kings, he would have been endured and would not have excited the senate and plebs against him so as to take the state away from him." Tarquin's tyranny over the people of Rome would lead to his overthrow and incredibly negative status in Roman history. From Tarquin's example can modern princes learn how to run their kingdom: "Thus princes may know that they begin to lose their state at the hour they begin to break the laws and those modes and those customs that are ancient, under which men have lived a long time." It is in a prince's interests to rule well for "when men are governed well they do not seek or wish for any other freedom."

Chapter 6, the longest chapter in the book, pertains to conspiracies. Machiavelli believes that the danger of conspiracy must be raised as "many more princes are seen to have lost their lives and states through these than by open war. For to be able to make open war on a prince is granted to few; to be able to conspire against them is granted to everyone." He cites the verdict of Cornelius Tacitus as someone everyone should fellow, as it says that "men have to honor past things and obey present ones; and they should desire good princes and tolerate them, however they may be made. And truly, whoever does otherwise, most often ruins himself and his fatherland." Machiavelli immediately makes it clear that "the prince who has excited this universal hatred against himself has particular individuals who have been more offended by him and whose desire to avenge themselves." Much like how in Chapter 5, there is incentive to being a good ruler. Machiavelli writes that "property and honor are two things that offend men more than any other offense, from which the prince should guard himself." Of honors taken away from men, women are incredibly important. He cites an example in modern Italy of when Giulio Belanti moved against Pandolfo Petrucci, tyrant of Sienna, after his daughter had been stolen to be made Pandolfo's wife. Another motivator for conspiracy is when a man feels the desire to free his fatherland from whoever has seized it. This was primarily what drove Brutus and Cassius to conspire against Caesar. Machiavelli gives examples of how any man can create a conspiracy, ranging from the nobleman who assassinated King Philip of Macedon to the Spanish peasant who stabbed King Ferdinand in the neck." He asserts that "all conspiracies are made by great men of those very familiar to the prince." Though any man can lead a conspiracy, only great men can perfectly execute it. Dangers are found in conspiracies at three times: before, in the deed, and after. Machiavelli writes that when a conspiracy has been exposed, it takes a great man to surrender only himself and not his fellow conspirators. The modern examples of these kind men are few, but Machiavelli cites Livy's example of "the conspiracy made against Hieronymus, king of Syracuse, in which Theodorus, one of the conspirators, was taken and with great virtue concealed all the conspirators and accused the friends of the king". Another example from Roman history Machiavelli raises is the Pisonian conspiracy against Nero. He then takes examples of conspiracy to his own time, writing of the conspiracy of the Pazzi against Lorenzo and Giuliano de' Medici. Failure to execute a conspiracy results only from the executor's own cowardice and lack of spirit. According to Machiavelli, an example can be found in Livy's writings when "after Marius had been taken by the Minturnans, a slave was sent to kill him, who, frightened by the presence of that man and by the memory of his name, became cowardly and lost all force for killing him." He establishes that "conspiracies that are made against the fatherland are less dangerous for the ones who make them than those against princes."

The topic for Chapter 7 summarizes the entire entry: "Whence it arises that changes from freedom to servitude and from servitude to freedom are some of them without blood, some of them full of it." Machiavelli cites the bloodless expulsion of the Tarquins from Ancient Rome and from his own period, the expulsion of the Medici family in 1494, as examples of such nonviolent changes.

The heading of Chapter 8 is, "Whoever wishes to alter a republic should consider its subject." Machiavelli begins Chapter 8 stating that "...a wicked citizen cannot work for ill in a republic that is not corrupt." He cites the example of the Romans Spurius Cassius and Manlius Capitolinus. Spurius's hopes to win over the Plebs with gifts were dashed when they refused him, knowing that it would cost them their freedom. If the Plebs had been wicked, they would have accepted Spurius's tyranny. Camillus was another man who misunderstood the Roman people. Machiavelli concludes that "Two things are to be considered here: one, that one has to seek glory in a corrupt city by modes other than in one that still lives politically; the other (which is almost the same as the first), that men in their proceedings—and so much the more in great actions—should consider the times and accommodate themselves to them."

Chapter 9 concerns "How one must vary with the times if one wishes always to have good fortune." Machiavelli writes, "I have often considered that the cause of the bad and of the good fortune of men is the matching of the mode of one's proceeding with the times." He continues, saying that "...he comes to err less and to have prosperous fortune who matches the time with his mode...and always proceeds as nature forces you." Machiavelli gives the example of Quintus Fabius Maximus, who was able to turn the tides of the Punic Wars "with his slowness and caution." His behavior matched the state of the Roman republic and its army at the time. He raises the example of Piero Soderini again, who "proceeded in all his affairs with humanity and patience. He and his fatherland prospered while the times were comfortable to the mode of proceeding; but as times came later when he needed to break with patience and humility, he did not know how to do it, so that he together with his fatherland were ruined."

Chapter 10 pertains to the fact that "a captain cannot flee battle when the adversary wishes him to engage in it in any mode." Machiavelli refers to those princes or republics who send out others to represent them in war as "effeminate." He believes that these republics and princes are following the footsteps of Fabius Maximus, "who in deferring combat saved the state for the Romans." They misinterpret this great Roman's deed, however, as according to Machiavelli, it "is nothing other than to say:'Do battle to the enemy's purpose and not yours.'" If one hides in his city, far from the field of battle, he "leaves one's country as prey to the enemy." If one hides within the city with his army, they will be besieged, starved, and forced to surrender. Machiavelli's next point is that "one ought to wish to acquire glory even when losing; and one has more glory in being conquered by force than through another inconvenience that has made you lose."

Machiavelli begins Chapter 11 explaining the considerable power to the tribunes of the plebs (or "of the people" (Note: In the Ninian Hill Thomson translation)): "The power of the tribunes of the plebs in the city of Rome was great, and it was necessary, as had been discoursed of by us many times, because otherwise one would not have been able to place a check on the ambition of the nobility, which would have corrupted that republic a long time before it did corrupt itself." The Tribunes worked together with many other Romans to overthrow those who sought to corrupt the Republic. Machiavelli concludes from the Roman example that "...whenever there are many powers united against another power, even though all together are much more powerful, nonetheless, one ought always to put more hope in that one alone, who is less mighty, than in the many, even though very mighty." Machiavelli desires to talk about modern examples, however; he brings up when, in 1483, all the Italian states declared war on Venice. When they could no longer field an army, they corrupted the duke of Milan and were able to regain any towns they had lost and part of the state of Ferrara.

The heading for Chapter 12 states, "That a prudent captain ought to impose every necessity to engage in combat on his soldiers and take it away from those of enemies." According to Machiavelli, this is an important duty for the captain of any army. In the second paragraph, Machiavelli states, "when he assaults a town, a captain ought to contrive with all diligence to lift such necessity from its defenders, and in consequence such obstinacy—if they have fear of punishment, he promises pardon, and if they had fear for their freedom. He shows he does not go against the common good but against the ambitious few in the city, which has many times made campaigns and captures of towns easier." From Livy's writing, Machiavelli cites an example when Camillus, already inside of the city of the Veientes with his army, commanded, loud enough for the inhabitants to hear him, that no one should hurt those who are unarmed.

Chapter 13 begins with a question: "Which is more to be trusted, a good captain who has a weak army or a good army that has a weak captain." Machiavelli's raises the story of Coriolanus, a Roman exile who transformed the conquered Volusci into a functional fighting force. There have also been moments in Roman history when an army has performed better after the deaths of their consuls. At the end of the chapter, Machiavelli asserts that "a captain who has time to instruct men and occasion to arm them is very much more to be trusted than an insolent army with a head made tumultuously by it."

Chapter 14 concerns "What effects new inventions that appear in the middle of the fight and new voices that are heard may produce." Machiavelli cites the example of Quintius, who "seeing one of the wings of his army bending, began to cry out loudly that it should stand steady because the other wing of the army was victorious, and—this word having given spirit to his men and terrified the enemy—he won." This chapter concerns sudden events that may happen in the midst of heated battle. According to Machiavelli, "...a good captain among his other orders ought to order whoever are those who have to pick up his voice and relay it to others, and accustom his soldiers not to believe any but them and his captains not say anything but what has been commissioned by him." Such actions would control the morale of the army.

Chapter 15's topic is "That one individual and not many should be put over an army; and that several commanders hurt." Machiavelli references an incident in Roman history when the Romans created four tribunes with consular power to control the colony of Fidenae. "They left one of them for the guarding of Rome and sent three against the Fidantes and the Veientes. Because they were divided among themselves and disunited, they brought back dishonor and not harm."

Chapter 16 pertains to "That in difficult times one goes to find true; and in easy times not virtuous men but those with riches or kinship have more favour." Machiavelli writes that "It has always been, and will always be, that great and rare men are neglected in a republic in peaceful times." He continues with this point, referencing Nicias of Athens: "For while Athens was at peace, he knew that there were infinite citizens who wished to go ahead of him; but if war was made, he knew that no citizen would be superior or equal to him." Nicias was against the Athenian invasion of Sicily during the Peloponnesian War since he believed Athens was already on the verge of victory; the spectacular failure of the invasion changed the tide of the war. He relates this belief to a moment in Florentine history; when, in 1494, "the city came upon one individual who showed how armies have to be commanded, who was Antonio Giacomini. While dangerous wars had to be made, all the ambition of the other citizens ceased, and in the choice of commissioner and head of the armies he had no competitor..."

At the beginning of Chapter 17, Machiavelli asserts that "A republic ought to consider very much not putting someone over any important administration to whom any notable injury had been done by another." He brings up the consul Claudius Nero, who "throughout the city he was spoken of indecently, not without great dishonor and indignation for him."

The heading for Chapter 19 declares that "Nothing is more worthy of a captain than to foretell the policies of the enemy." Close to the end of the Roman civil war between Brutus and Cassius and Marc Antony and Octavian, Brutus won the battle on his wing but Cassius believed that Brutus had actually lost. Thinking the battle to be all but over, Cassius killed himself. Machiavelli relates the point of Chapter 19 to a moment in modern history; when, in 1498, Florence went to war with Venice and was able to predict the enemy army's movements and win the war.

In Chapter 19, Machiavelli states that "it appears in governing a multitude, it is better to be humane rather than proud, merciful rather than cruel."

Chapter 20 concerns the story of Camillus when he was besieging the city of the Falsci. A schoolmaster of the noblest children of the city ventured out and offered the children to the Roman camp. Camillus refused the offer, and after binding the hands of the schoolmaster, gave rods to each of the children and escorted them back into the city while they beat him. When the Falsci heard of Camillus's good act, they willfully surrendered the city without putting up a fight. Machiavelli concludes from the story that "Here it is to be considered with this true example how much more a humane act full of charity is sometimes able to do in the spirits of men than a ferocious and violent act..."

Chapter 21 is titled "Whence it arises that with a different mode of proceeding Hannibal produced those same effects in Italy as Scipio did in Spain." When the Roman Scipio Africanus entered Spain, his humanity and mercy immediately made the entire province friendly to him. In a similar manner, when Hannibal marched through Italy, many cities rebelled and followed him. Machiavelli believes such things occurred because "men are desirous of new things, so much that most often those who are well off desire newness as much as those who are badly off...this desire makes the doors open to everyone who makes himself head of an innovation in a province." Eventually both leaders were rejected by the people who had once accepted them in these provinces.

Chapter 22 is titled "That the hardness of Manlius Torquatus and the kindness of Valerius Corvinus acquired for each the same glory." Machiavelli begins the chapter relating the story of "two excellent captains in Rome at one and the same time, Manlius Torquatus and Valerius Corvinus. They lived in Rome with like virtue, with like triumphs and glory, and each of them, in what pertained to the enemy, acquired it with like virtue; but in what belonged to the armies and to their dealings with the soldiers, they proceeded very diversely. For Manlius commanded his soldiers with every kind of severity...Valerius, on the other hand, dealt with them with every humane mode and means and full of a familiar domesticity." As one can assume from the title, two very different men achieved very similar glory. Later on, Machiavelli asserts that "to command strong things one must be strong; and he who is of this strength and who commands them cannot then make them observed with mildness. But whoever is not of this strength of spirit ought to guard himself from extraordinary commands and can use his humanity in ordinary ones..." He concludes the chapter stating that the behavior of Manlius and Valerius fit specific needs: "the proceedings of Valerius is useful in a prince and pernicious in a citizen, not only to the fatherland but to himself: to it, because those modes prepare the way for tyranny; to himself, because in suspecting his mode of proceeding, his city is constrained to secure itself against him to his harm. So by the contrary I affirm that the proceeding of Manlius is harmful in a prince and useful in a citizen, and especially to the fatherland..."

Chapter 23 concerns "For what cause Camillus was expelled from Rome." According to Machiavelli, "Titus Livy brings up these causes of the hatred: first, that he applied to the public the money that was drawn from the goods of the Veientes that were sold and did not divide it as booty; another, that in the triumph, he had his triumphal chariot pulled by four white horses, from which they said that because of his pride he wished to be equal to the sun; third, that he made a vow to Apollo the tenth part of the booty of the Veientes..." When the people were denied their part of the loot, they rebelled against Camillus.

Referring to the Roman Republic, Machiavelli begins Chapter 24 establishing that "...two things were the cause of the dissolution of that republic: one was the contentions that arose from Agrarian law; the other, the prolongation of commands. If these things had been known well from the beginning, and proper remedies produced for them, a free way of life would have been longer and perhaps quieter."

In Chapter 25. Machiavelli states that "the most useful thing that may be ordered in a free way of life is that the citizens be kept poor." He recalls the story of the great Cincinnatus, who, when the Rome was in grave danger, was made dictator by the Senate and saved the Republic. When the battle was over, he surrendered his power and returned to his small villa. His humbleness or "poverty" became something future Romans tried to emulate. Machiavelli concludes the chapter writing, "One could show with a long speech how much better fruits poverty produced than riches, and how the one has honored cities, provinces, sects, and the other has ruined them..."

Chapter 26's title is "How a State is ruined because of women." He summarizes his own thoughts close to the end of the chapter: "In this text are several things to be noted. First, one sees that women have been causes of much ruin, and have done great harm to those who govern a city, and have caused many divisions in them." He raises the example of Lucretia, whose rape by Tarquin the Proud's son ultimately led the exile of the Tarquin family from Rome and destruction of the Roman monarchy.

Chapter 27 concerns "How one has to unite a divided city; and how that opinion is not true that to hold cities one needs to hold them divided." Referring to when the Romans handled tumult the leaders of a divided city they had recently conquered (Ardea), Machiavelli believes that there are three possible ways to handle the leaders of rebellion within a held city: "...either to kill them, as they did; or to remove them from the city; or to make them make peace together under obligations not to offend one another." Machiavelli relates this belief to when, in his own times, Florence conquered the city of Pistoia. The Florentine rulers tried all 3 methods when handling the feuding houses of the city. He establishes that it is impossible to rule a divided city.

The heading for Chapter 28 states that "One should be mindful of the works of citizens because many times underneath a merciful work a beginning of tyranny is concealed." Machiavelli relates it to a moment in Roman history when there was considerable famine and the wealthy man Spurius Maelius planned to distribute grain to win over the favor of the Plebs. Maelius planned to become dictator with this favor but was executed by the senate before he could do so.

Chapter 29's topic is "That the sins of peoples arise from princes." Machiavelli establishes that "Princes should not complain of any sin that the people whom they have to govern commit, for it must be that such sins arise either by negligence or by his being stained with like errors." A king should not punish his citizens for pillaging in war when he is himself a known pillager. Machiavelli relates this belief held by Roman rulers to a quote from Lorenzo de' Medici: "And that which the lord does, many do later; For all eyes are turned to the lord."

Chapter 30 pertains to how envy must be eliminated if a man wants to do good work in the republic, and that if one sees the enemy, he must order the defense of his city. In Rome's early history, envy between great Romans led to a dysfunction in the army and failures in war. Referring to envy, Machiavelli believes that "in many times that the cause that men cannot work well, since the said envy does not permit them to have the authority that is necessary to have in things of importance." Machiavelli does think this envy can be eliminated when "either through some strong and difficult accident in which each, seeing himself perishing, puts aside every ambition and runs voluntarily to obey him" or "...when, either by violence or by natural order, those who have been your competitors in coming to some reputation and to some greatness die."

The heading for Chapter 31 states "Strong republics and excellent men retain the same spirit and their same dignity in every fortune." If the leader of a republic is weak, then his republic will be weak. Machiavelli raises the modern example of the Venetians, whose good fortune created a sort of "insolence" that they failed to respect the powerful states around them and lost much of their territorial holdings. Machiavelli asserts that is necessary to have a strong military in order to have a state with "good laws or any other good thing thing [sic?]."

Chapter 32 concerns "what modes some have held to for disturbing a peace." Machiavelli cites several examples from the Punic Wars.

The heading for Chapter 33 asserts that "If one wishes to win a battle, it is necessary to make the army confident both among themselves and in the captain." Machiavelli lists out the methods to do so: "...that it be armed and ordered well, that [its members] know one another. Nor this confidence arise except in soldiers who have been born and lived together. The captain must esteemed of a quality that they trust in his prudence." Once an army trusts, they win.

Chapter 34 pertains to "What fame or word or opinion makes the people being to favor a citizen; and whether it distributes the magistracies with great prudence than a prince." Machiavelli brings up the example of Titus Manlius who, upon rescuing his father, the "filial piety" displayed inspired the people and led to Titus Manlius being put in second command of the tribunes of the legions.

Chapter 35 concerns "What dangers are borne in making oneself head in counseling a thing; and the more it has of the extraordinary, the greater are the dangers incurred in it." Machiavelli writes that "since men judging things by the end, all the ill that results from it is attributed to the author of the counsel; and if good results from it, he is commended for it, but the reward by far does not counterbalance the harm." He brings up the present story of the Sultan Selim who, after receiving faulty military advice and losing a great part of his army, killed the men who gave him this advice.

In Chapter 36, Machiavelli tackles "The causes why the French have been are still judged in fights at the beginning as more than men and later as less than women." Machiavelli believes that this stereotype first arose in Livy's writings; when the Romans did battle with the Gauls. The Gauls were quick to start fights but in actual combat failed spectacularly. He writes that while the Roman army had fury and virtue, the army of the Gauls only had fury, which, more often than not, lead them into embarrassing battles.

In Chapter 37, Machiavelli wonders "Whether small battles are necessary before the main battle; and if one wishes to avoid them, what one ought to do to know a new enemy." Pondering this question, Machiavelli writes, "For I consider, on one side, that a good captain ought altogether to avoid working for anything that is of small moment and can produce bad effects on his army: for to begin a fight in which all one's force are not at work and all one's fortune is risked is a thing altogether rash...On the other side, I consider that when wise captains come up against a new enemy who is reputed, before they come to the main battle they are necessitated to make trial of such enemies with light fight for their soldiers..."

In Chapter 38, Machiavelli writes of "How a captain in whom his army can have confidence ought to be made." In a captain demanding of his troop to follow his deeds, not his words, there seems to be great success.

The topic of Chapter 39 is "That a captain ought to be a knower of sites." It is necessary for a captain to have knowledge of other countries.

In Chapter 40, Machiavelli states, "Although the use of fraud in every action is detestable, nonetheless in managing war it is a praiseworthy and glorious thing, and he who overcomes the enemy with fraud is praised as much as the one who overcomes it with force." Fraud in war means fooling the enemy. He raises the story of Pontus, captain of the Samnites, who sent some of his soldiers in shepherds clothing to the Roman camp so that they could be lead them into an ambush where Pontus's army was waiting.

Chapter 41 establishes "That the fatherland ought to be defended, whether with ignominy or with glory; and it is well defended in any mode whatever."

Chapter 42 is quite short and can be summarized in its heading: "That promises made through force ought not to be observed."

Chapter 43 pertains to the fact that "Men who are born in one province observe almost the same nature for all times." The nature of things in the present is not much different than it was in Livy's time. According to Machiavelli, "Whoever reads of things past in our city of Florence and considers also those that have occurred in the nearest times will find German and French people full of avarice, pride, ferocity, and faithlessness, for all those four things have much offended our city in diverse times."

The point of Chapter 44 can be summarized in its heading: "One often obtains with impetuosity and audacity what one would never have obtained through ordinary modes." There is great reward to being ambitious in key moments like a battle.

In Chapter 45, Machiavelli wonders, "What the better policy is in battles, to resist the thrust of enemies and, having resisted it, to charge them; or indeed to assault them with fury from the first." He raises the story of Decius and Fabius, two Roman consuls at war with the Samnites and Etruscans. They attacked the enemy in two entirely different manners, one slow and defensive, the other exhausting his army in a furious manner.

Chapter 46 concerns that "not only does one city have certain modes and institutions diverse from another, and procreates men either harder or more effeminate, but in the same city one sees such a difference to exist from one family to another." Machiavelli believes not to be the result of bloodline, but education.

Chapter 47 is incredibly short and can be summarized in its heading: "That a good citizen ought to forget private injuries for love of his fatherland."

In Chapter 48, Machiavelli believes that "when one sees a great error made by an enemy, one ought to believe that there is deception underneath." He cites examples from both his own time, such as when Florence went to war with Pisa in 1508, and when Rome was at war with the Etruscans.

The final chapter of Book 3 concerns the fact that "A republic has need of new acts of foresight every day if one wishes to maintain it free; and for what merits Quintus Fabius was called Maximus." Quintus Fabius was a Roman censor who took all the young Romans who failed to understand the basics of the Republic and "derived under four tribes, so that by being shut in such small spaces they could not corrupt all Rome. Due to the expediency of this fix, and the fact that it was well received by the people of Rome, he gained the name "Maximus".

== Reception and reaction ==
Francesco Guicciardini, Machiavelli's close friend and critic, read the book and wrote critical notes (Considerazioni) on many of the chapters. He also objected to much of Machiavelli's advice, as he thought that many of his recommendations were too vicious, stating that:

Violent remedies, though they make one safe from one aspect, yet from another ... involve all kinds of weaknesses. Hence the prince must take courage to use these extraordinary means when necessary, and should yet take care not to miss any chance which offers of establishing his cause with humanity, kindness, and rewards, not taking as an absolute rule what Machiavelli says, who was always extremely partial to extraordinary and violent methods.

Jean-Jacques Rousseau considered the Discourses (as well as the Florentine Histories) to be more representative of Machiavelli's true philosophy:

Machiavelli was a proper man and a good citizen; but, being attached to the court of the Medici, he could not help veiling his love of liberty in the midst of his country's oppression. The choice of his detestable hero, Cesare Borgia, clearly enough shows his hidden aim; and the contradiction between the teaching of The Prince and that of the Discourses on Livy and the History of Florence shows that this profound political thinker has so far been studied only by superficial or corrupt readers. The Court of Rome sternly prohibited his book. I can well believe it; for it is that Court it most clearly portrays.

— Rousseau, The Social Contract, Book III.

== See also ==
- Republicanism
