= Virtù =

Concept theorized by Machiavelli

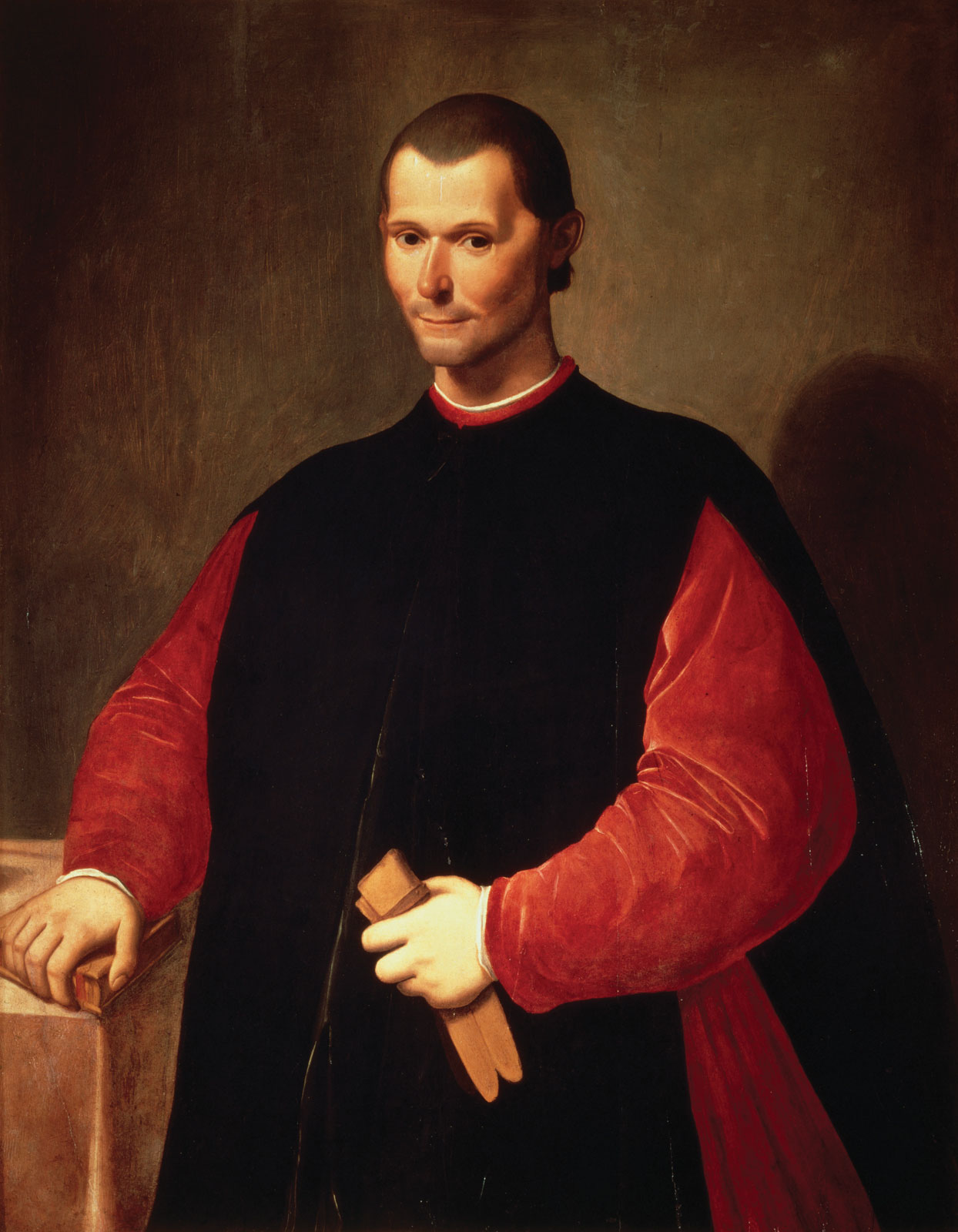
Machiavelli in the robes of a Florentine public official

Virtù is a concept theorized by Niccolò Machiavelli, centered on the martial spirit and ability of a person, but also encompassing a broader collection of traits necessary for maintenance of the state and "the achievement of great things." In a secondary development, the same word came to mean an object of art.

== Classical and medieval origins ==
Virtù, an Italian word meaning "virtue" or "power", is derived from the Latin virtus (lit. "manliness" but for a sense of 'man' closer to 'gentleman' than 'masculine' or 'male'). It describes the qualities desirable for a man, as opposed to vizio (vice). In the Italian language, the term virtù is historically related to the Greek concept of aretḗ, the Latin virtus, and medieval Catholic virtues, e.g. the seven virtues. Thus, Machiavelli's use of the term is linked to the concept of virtue ethics.

Aristotle had early raised the question "whether we ought to regard the virtue of a good man and that of a sound citizen as the same virtue"; Thomas Aquinas stressed that sometimes "someone is a good citizen who has not the quality... [of] a good man".

Machiavelli suggests a different set of virtues than Aristotle and Thomas Aquinas, apparently with less focus on beneficence and concord, and with more focus on courage. According to Machiavelli, virtù includes pride, bravery, skill, forcefulness, and an ability to harness ruthlessness when necessary. But Machiavelli is always careful to insist that these are the marks of a good ruler, not a good person. In this, he is following in Aristotle's footsteps in the Politics, where he says that the virtue of the person and the virtue of the citizen are often not the same, while the ruler is just the citizen who rules and, when excellent, does so with practical wisdom.

Virtù is, in practice, a ruler having the intelligence to know what needs doing coupled with the willpower and fortitude to follow through with what are sometimes starkly immoral but likely necessary actions. In The Prince, Machiavelli praises both Cesare Borgia and the Roman emperor Septimuis Severus, for instance, as both having virtù, despite both resorting to significant ruthlessness and brutality during their rise to power and subsequent rule. By contrast, Agathocles of Syracuse and Severus' son Caracalla come in for significant criticism because their brutality was unnecessary—they apparently did not know what needed doing, so Machiavelli denies that they had virtù.

== Florentines ==
Florentine republicans at the turn of the 16th century CE like Francesco Guicciardini rediscovered the classical concept of the virtue of the active citizen, and looked to it for an answer to the problems of preserving their city-state's independence.

Machiavelli extended the study of classical virtue to include skill, valor, and leadership, and to encompass the individual prince or war-leader as well.

Virtù, for Machiavelli, was not equivalent to moral virtue, but was instead linked to the ability for a prince to win and maintain his state, even at the expense of ethical conduct.

=== Influence ===
Both the positive Machiavellian idealisation of the virtues of ancient Roman republicanism, and the negative image of virtù as realpolitik passed into the wider European consciousness over the centuries that followed.

== Artistic value ==
A secondary English meaning developed in the 18th century: a curio or art-object – something of value in itself. Thus, Horace Walpole could refer to "my books, my virtus and my other follies".

Following the establishment of the Royal Academy in 1768, one contemporary considered that "the taste for virtu has become universal; persons of all ranks and degrees set up for connoisseurs".

== See also ==
- Hercules at the crossroads – Ancient Greek anecdote of choice between vice or virtue
- Virtuosos – Individual who possesses outstanding technical ability in a particular art or field
