= Christopher J. Boes =

American neurologist and historian

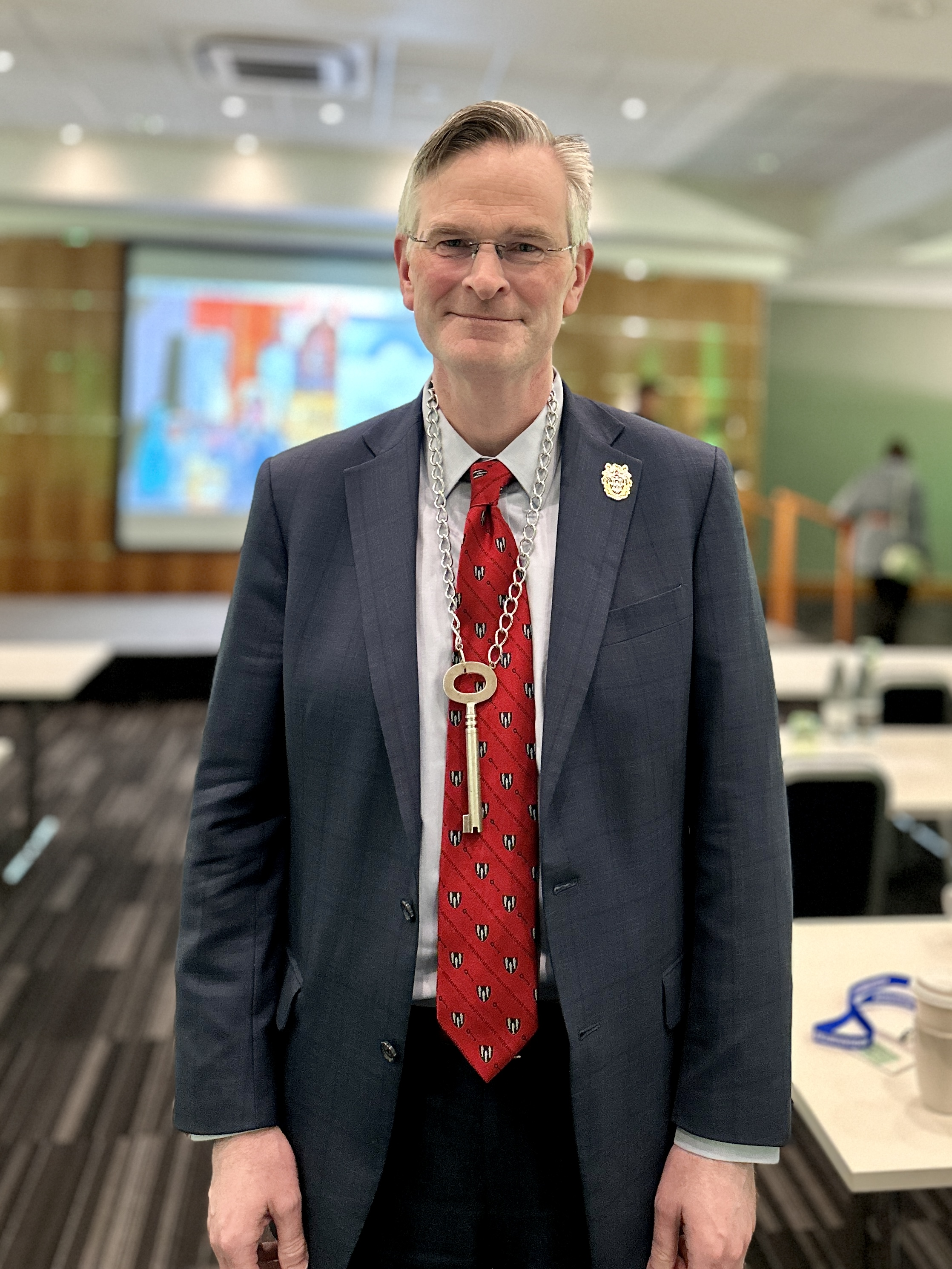
- Boes, seen in 2023 wearing the latchkey symbol of the American Osler Society
- Education: Creighton University; University of Nebraska College of Medicine
- Known for: President of the American Osler Society (2022–2023)
- Medical career
- Profession: Physician
- Field: Neurology
- Institutions: Mayo Clinic, Rochester, Minnesota
- Sub-specialties: Headache, trigeminal autonomic cephalalgias
- Research: Neurology; History of medicine; History of education at the Mayo Clinic
- Awards: Henry W. Woltman Award (2000); Lawrence C. McHenry Award (2014, 2017)

Christopher J. Boes is an American neurologist and historian of medicine. He holds the titles of professor of neurology, professor of history of medicine, director of the W. Bruce Fye Center for the History of Medicine, at the Mayo Clinic, Rochester, Minnesota, and since 2022 is the Mayo Clinic Designated Institutional Official (DIO). His research focuses on the management of headache, including migraine and trigeminal autonomic cephalalgias. His work in the field of history of medicine includes research on Sir William Gowers, Sir William Osler, Bayard Taylor Horton, Mary Broadfoot Walker, Betty Clements and Harry Lee Parker.

Boes was president of the American Osler Society (AOS) for 2022–23.

== Early life and education ==
Christopher Boes is from Elgin, Nebraska. One of six children, his father was Gene Boes who ran a farming cooperative, and his mother is Mary Jane. As a child he worked as a paperboy delivering the Omaha World-Herald.

Boes earned his bachelor's degree from Creighton University, and his Doctor of Medicine, with high distinction, from the University of Nebraska College of Medicine in 1996. Following his internship at Nebraska, he completed his residency at the Mayo Clinic College of Medicine, Rochester, Minnesota, before being granted a fellowship with the Headache Group at the Institute of Neurology, National Hospital for Neurology and Neurosurgery, in Queen Square, London.

== Career ==
Boes holds the title of professor of neurology and professor of history of medicine at the Mayo Clinic, Rochester, Minnesota. His research focuses on the management of headache, including migraine and trigeminal autonomic cephalalgias. In that field he has analysed the strengths and weakness of evidence for oral magnesium supplementation in the treatment of migraine.

Between 2005 and 2013 he was Neurology Residency Program Director at the Mayo Clinic, Rochester, Minnesota. In a personal note regarding student applications to neurology, he reported that after the death of neurologist Oliver Sacks, it became less common for students to mention Sacks in their neurology resident application forms.

In 2022 he was appointed the Mayo Clinic Designated Institutional Official (DIO). (Note: The DIO is the individual in a Sponsoring Institution who has the authority and responsibility for all of that institution’s ACGME-accredited programs.)

=== History of medicine ===
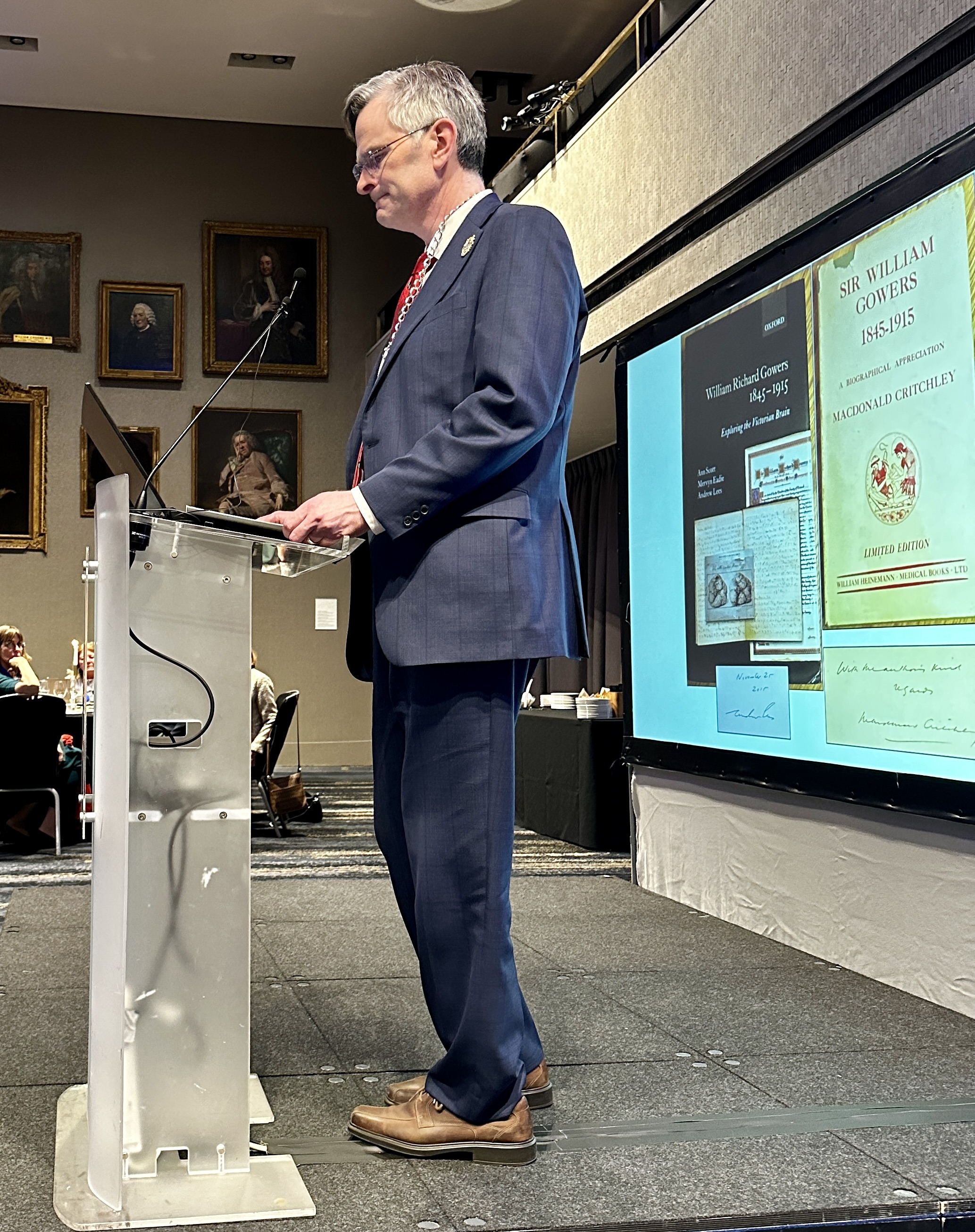
Boes delivering his AOS presidential address on Gowers and Osler in the Osler Room at the Royal College of Physicians, London (2023)

In his research on history of medicine, Boes has focused on Sir William Gowers, Sir William Osler, Bayard Taylor Horton, Mary Broadfoot Walker, Harry Lee Parker, and Betty Clements.

In 2002 he co-authored a detailed account of Wilfred Harris' classification of some of the first reports of cluster headache; what Harris termed 'migrainous neuralgia'. His 2005 paper "Chronic migraine and medication-overuse headache through the ages" noted that ergotamine-misuse headache was reported before Peters and Horton's 1951 clear documentation of it. In the journal Brain in 2010, he co-authored "A history of non-drug treatment of headache, particularly migraine".

In 2014 Boes was appointed director of the W. Bruce Fye Center for the History of Medicine, at the Mayo Clinic. His 2015 paper “The founding of the Mayo School of Graduate Medical Education” highlighted the contribution of Mayo Clinic to American graduate medical education. In his 2016 article "Gowers and Osler: good friends 'all through'", he identified that Osler probably based the neurology parts of his 1892 medical textbook The Principles and Practice of Medicine, on Gowers' neurology manual, first published in 1886.

Between 2015 and 2017 he chaired the history of neurology section of the American Academy of Neurology (AAN). He was president of the American Osler Society for 2022–23, having been first elected there in 2010.

== Awards ==
Boes earned the Henry W. Woltman Award in 2000. He was awarded the AAN's Residency-Fellowship Program Director Recognition Award in 2013. In both 2014 and 2017 he won the Lawrence C. McHenry Award for excellence in history of neurology research from the AAN. (Note: An award for research in history of neurology presented by the AAN.)

== Selected publications ==
- Matharu, Manjit S.; Boes, Christopher J.; Goadsby, Peter J. (2003). "Management of trigeminal autonomic cephalgias and hemicrania continua". Drugs. 63 (16): 1637–1677. doi:10.2165/00003495-200363160-00002. ISSN 0012-6667. PMID 12904085. S2CID 2505735.
- Boes, C. J.; Capobianco, D. J. (May 2005). "Chronic migraine and medication-overuse headache through the ages". Cephalalgia: An International Journal of Headache. 25 (5): 378–390. doi:10.1111/j.1468-2982.2005.00868.x. ISSN 0333-1024. PMID 15839853. S2CID 44950782.
- Boes, Christopher J.; Long, Timothy R.; Rose, Steven H.; Fye, W. Bruce (February 2015). "The founding of the Mayo School of Graduate Medical Education". Mayo Clinic Proceedings. 90 (2): 252–263. doi:10.1016/j.mayocp.2014.12.008. ISSN 1942-5546. PMID 25659241.
- Boes, Christopher J. (April 2015). "History of neurologic examination books". Proceedings (Baylor University. Medical Center). 28 (2): 172–179. doi:10.1080/08998280.2015.11929220. ISSN 0899-8280. PMC 4365111. PMID 25829645.
- Teigen, Levi; Boes, Christopher J. (September 2015). "An evidence-based review of oral magnesium supplementation in the preventive treatment of migraine". Cephalalgia: An International Journal of Headache. 35 (10): 912–922. doi:10.1177/0333102414564891. ISSN 1468-2982. PMID 25533715. S2CID 25398410.
- Boes, C. J. (March 2016). "Gowers and Osler: good friends 'all through'". The Journal of the Royal College of Physicians of Edinburgh. 46 (1): 55–64. doi:10.4997/JRCPE.2016.112. ISSN 2042-8189. PMID 27092371. S2CID 30038941.
- Boes, Christopher J.; Toodayan, Nadeem; Lees, Andrew (August 1, 2017). "Finding the grave of Sir William Richard Gowers". Practical Neurology. 17 (4): 321–322. doi:10.1136/practneurol-2017-001648. ISSN 1474-7758. PMID 28473605. S2CID 3531244.
- McCarter, Stuart J; Burkholder, David B; Klaas, James P; Martinez-Thompson, Jennifer M; Boes, Christopher J (September 2019). "The Mary Walker Effect: Mary Broadfoot Walker". Journal of the Royal College of Physicians of Edinburgh. 49 (3): 255–259. doi:10.4997/jrcpe.2019.317. PMID 31497797. S2CID 201984005.
- Boes, Christopher J.; Burkholder, David B.; Coon, Elizabeth A.; Cutsforth-Gregory, Jeremy K.; Klaas, James P.; Jones, Lyell K. (October 2020). "Reciprocal Development and Progressive Responsibility: The History of the Mayo Clinic Neurology Residency". Mayo Clinic Proceedings. Innovations, Quality & Outcomes. 4 (5): 478–498. doi:10.1016/j.mayocpiqo.2020.06.006. ISSN 2542-4548. PMC 7557208. PMID 33083697.

== See also ==
- List of presidents of the American Osler Society
