= International Classification of Headache Disorders =

Detailed hierarchical classification

The International Classification of Headache Disorders (ICHD) is a detailed hierarchical classification of all headache-related disorders published by the International Headache Society. It is considered the official classification of headaches by the World Health Organization, and, in 1992, was incorporated into the 10th edition of their International Classification of Diseases (ICD-10). Each class of headache contains explicit diagnostic criteria—meaning that the criteria include quantities rather than vague terms like several or usually—that are based on clinical and laboratory observations.

The ICHD was first published in 1988 (now known as the ICHD-1). A second version, the ICHD-2, was published in 2004. The most current version, ICHD-3, was published in 2018.

== Hierarchy ==
=== Primary headaches ===
==== ICHD 1, ICD10 G43: Migraine ====
Migraine without aura
Migraine with aura
Childhood periodic syndromes that are commonly precursors of migraine
Retinal migraine
Complications of migraine
Migraine-triggered seizure
Probable migraine

==== ICHD 2, ICD10 G44.2: Tension-type headache (TTH) ====
Infrequent episodic tension-type headache
Frequent episodic tension-type headache
Chronic tension-type headache
Probable tension-type headache

==== ICHD 3, ICD10 G44.0: Cluster headache and other trigeminal autonomic cephalalgias ====
Cluster headache
Paroxysmal hemicrania
Short-lasting unilateral neuralgiform headache with conjunctival injection and tearing (SUNCT)
Probable trigeminal autonomic cephalalgia

==== ICHD 4, ICD10 G44.80: Other primary headaches ====
Primary stabbing headache
Primary cough headache
Primary exertional headache
Primary headache associated with sexual activity
Hypnic headache
Primary thunderclap headache
Hemicrania continua
New daily persistent headache (NDPH)

=== Secondary headaches ===
==== ICHD 5, ICD10 G44.88: Headache attributed to head and/or neck trauma ====
Acute post-traumatic headache

Acute post-traumatic headache attributed to moderate or severe head injury
Acute post-traumatic headache attributed to mild head injury

Chronic post-traumatic headache

Chronic post-traumatic headache attributed to moderate or severe head injury
Chronic post-traumatic headache attributed to mild head injury

Acute headache attributed to whiplash injury
Chronic headache attributed to whiplash injury
Headache attributed to traumatic intracranial haematoma

Headache attributed to epidural haematoma
Headache attributed to subdural haematoma

Headache attributed to other head and/or neck trauma

Acute headache attributed to other head and/or neck trauma
Chronic headache attributed to other head and/or neck trauma

Post-craniotomy headache

Acute post-craniotomy headache
Chronic post-craniotomy headache

==== ICHD 6, ICD10 G44.81: Headache attributed to cranial or cervical vascular disorder ====
Headache attributed to ischaemic stroke or transient ischaemic attack

Headache attributed to ischaemic stroke (cerebral infarction)
Headache attributed to transient ischaemic attack (TIA)

Headache attributed to non-traumatic intracranial haemorrhage

Headache attributed to intracerebral haemorrhage
Headache attributed to subarachnoid haemorrhage (SAH)

Headache attributed to unruptured vascular malformation

Headache attributed to saccular aneurysm
Headache attributed to arteriovenous malformation (AVM)
Headache attributed to dural arteriovenous fistula
Headache attributed to cavernous angioma
Headache attributed to encephalotrigeminal or leptomeningeal angiomatosis (Sturge Weber syndrome)

Headache attributed to arteritis

Headache attributed to giant cell arteritis (GCA)
Headache attributed to primary central nervous system (CNS) angiitis
Headache attributed to secondary central nervous system (CNS) angiitis

Carotid or vertebral artery pain

Headache or facial or neck pain attributed to arterial dissection
Post-endarterectomy headache
Carotid angioplasty headache
Headache attributed to intracranial endovascular procedures
Angiography headache

Headache attributed to cerebral venous thrombosis (CVT)
Headache attributed to other intracranial vascular disorder

CADASIL (cerebral autosomal dominant arteriopathy with subcortical infarcts and leukoencephalopathy)
MELAS (eitochondrial encephalopathy, lactic acidosis and stroke-like episodes)
Headache attributed to benign angiopathy of the central nervous system
Headache attributed to pituitary apoplexy

==== ICHD 7, ICD10 G44.82: Headache attributed to non-vascular intracranial disorder ====
Headache attributed to high cerebrospinal fluid pressure

Headache attributed to idiopathic intracranial hypertension (IIH)
Headache attributed to intracranial hypertension secondary to metabolic, toxic or hormonal causes
Headache attributed to intracranial hypertension secondary to hydrocephalus

Headache attributed to low cerebrospinal fluid pressure

Post-dural puncture headache
CSF fistula headache
Headache attributed to spontaneous (or idiopathic) low CSF pressure

Headache attributed to non-infectious inflammatory disease

Headache attributed to neurosarcoidosis
Headache attributed to aseptic (non-infectious) meningitis
Headache attributed to other non-infectious inflammatory disease
Headache attributed to lymphocytic hypophysitis

Headache attributed to intracranial neoplasm

Headache attributed to increased intracranial pressure or hydrocephalus caused by neoplasm
Headache attributed directly to neoplasm
Headache attributed to carcinomatous meningitis
Headache attributed to hypothalamic or pituitary hyper- or hyposecretion

Headache attributed to intrathecal injection
Headache attributed to epileptic seizure

Hemicrania epileptica
Post-seizure headache

Headache attributed to Chiari malformation type I (CM1)
Syndrome of transient headache and neurological deficits with cerebrospinal fluid lymphocytosis (HaNDL)
Headache attributed to other non-vascular intracranial disorder

==== ICHD 8, ICD10 G44.4 or G44.83: Headache attributed to a substance or its withdrawal ====
Headache induced by acute substance use or exposure

Nitric oxide (NO) donor-induced headache

Immediate NO donor-induced headache
Delayed NO donor-headache

Phosphodiesterase (PDE) inhibitor-induced headache
Carbon monoxide-induced headache
Alcohol-induced headache.

Immediate alcohol-induced headache
Delayed alcohol-induced headache

Headache induced by food components and additives

Monosodium glutamate-induced headache

Cocaine-induced headache
Cannabis-induced headache
Histamine-induced headache

Immediate histamine-induced headache
Delayed histamine-induced headache

Calcitonin gene-related peptide (CGRP)-induced headache

Immediate CGRP-induced headache
Delayed CGRP-induced headache

Headache as an acute adverse event attributed to medication used for other indications
Headache attributed to other acute substance use or exposure

Medication-overuse headache (MOH)

Ergotamine-overuse headache
Triptan-overuse headache
Analgesic-overuse headache
Opioid-overuse headache
Combination analgesic-overuse headache
Medication-overuse headache attributed to combination of acute medications
Headache attributed to other medication overuse
Probable medication-overuse headache

Headache as an adverse event attributed to chronic medication

Exogenous hormone-induced headache

Headache attributed to substance withdrawal

Caffeine-withdrawal headache
Opioid-withdrawal headache
Oestrogen-withdrawal headache
Headache attributed to withdrawal from chronic use of other substances

==== ICHD 9, ICD10 G44.821 or G44.881: Headache attributed to infection ====
Headache attributed to intracranial infection

Headache attributed to bacterial meningitis
Headache attributed to lymphocytic meningitis
Headache attributed to encephalitis
Headache attributed to brain abscess
Headache attributed to subdural empyema

Headache attributed to systemic infection

Headache attributed to systemic bacterial infection
Headache attributed to systemic viral infection
Headache attributed to other systemic infection

Headache attributed to HIV/AIDS
Chronic post-infection headache

Chronic post-bacterial meningitis headache

==== ICHD 10, ICD10 G44.882: Headache attributed to disorder of homeostasis ====
Headache attributed to hypoxia and/or hypercapnia

High-altitude headache
Diving headache
Sleep apnoea headache

Dialysis headache
Headache attributed to arterial hypertension

Headache attributed to phaeochromocytoma
Headache attributed to hypertensive crisis without hypertensive encephalopathy
Headache attributed to hypertensive encephalopathy
Headache attributed to pre-eclampsia
Headache attributed to eclampsia
Headache attributed to acute pressor response to an exogenous agent

Headache attributed to hypothyroidism
Headache attributed to fasting
Cardiac cephalalgia
Headache attributed to other disorder of homoeostasis

==== ICHD 11, ICD10 G44.84: Headache or facial pain attributed to disorder of cranium, neck, eyes, ears, nose, sinuses, teeth, mouth or other facial or cranial structures ====
Headache attributed to disorder of cranial bone
Headache attributed to disorder of neck

Cervicogenic headache
Headache attributed to retropharyngeal tendonitis
Headache attributed to craniocervical dystonia

Headache attributed to disorder of eyes

Headache attributed to acute glaucoma
Headache attributed to refractive errors
Headache attributed to heterophoria or heterotropia (latent or manifest squint)
Headache attributed to ocular inflammatory disorder

Headache attributed to disorder of ears
Headache attributed to rhinosinusitis
Headache attributed to disorder of teeth, jaws or related structures
Headache or facial pain attributed to temporomandibular joint (TMJ) disorder
Headache attributed to other disorder of cranium, neck, eyes, ears, nose, sinuses,

teeth, mouth or other facial or cervical structures

==== ICHD 12, ICD10 R51: Headache attributed to psychiatric disorder ====
Headache attributed to somatization disorder
Headache attributed to psychotic disorder

=== Cranial neuralgias, central and primary facial pain and other headaches ===
==== ICHD 13, ICD10 G44.847, G44.848, or G44.85: Cranial neuralgias and central causes of facial pain ====
ICHD 13.1, ICD10 G44.847: Trigeminal neuralgia

Glossopharyngeal neuralgia
Nervus intermedius neuralgia
Superior laryngeal neuralgia
Nasociliary neuralgia
Supraorbital neuralgia
Other terminal branch neuralgias
Occipital neuralgia
Neck-tongue syndrome
External compression headache
Cold-stimulus headache
Constant pain caused by compression, irritation or distortion of cranial nerves or upper cervical roots by structural lesions
Optic neuritis
Ocular diabetic neuropathy
Head or facial pain attributed to herpes zoster

Head or facial pain attributed to acute herpes zoster
Post-herpetic neuralgia

Tolosa–Hunt syndrome
Opthalamoplegic migraine
Central causes of facial pain

Anaesthesia dolorosa
Central post-stroke pain
Facial pain attributable to multiple sclerosis
Persistent idiopathic facial pain (the IHS's preferred term for atypical facial pain)
Burning mouth syndrome

Other cranial neuralgia or other centrally mediated facial pain

==== ICHD 14, ICD10 R51: Other headache, cranial neuralgia, central or primary facial pain ====
Headache not elsewhere classified
Headache unspecified
