= SUNCT syndrome =

- Specialty: Neurology
- Frequency: 50 described cases (as of 2015)

Short-lasting unilateral neuralgiform headache with conjunctival injection and tearing (SUNCT syndrome) is a rare headache disorder that belongs to the group of headaches called trigeminal autonomic cephalalgia (TAC). Symptoms include severe burning, stabbing, or electric headaches mainly near the eye and typically these sensations are only on one side of the body. The headache attacks are typically accompanied by cranial autonomic signs that are unique to SUNCT. Each attack lasts between five seconds to six minutes and may occur as often as 200 times per day.

TACs are caused by activation of the autonomic nervous system pathways linked to the trigeminal nerve.

As of 2015 about 50 cases have been described in the medical literature. Onset of the symptoms usually come later in life, at an average age of about 50. Although the majority of patients are men over the age of 50, it is not uncommon to find SUNCT present among other age groups, including children and infants.

== Signs and symptoms ==
People affected by SUNCT often describe their headache attacks as excruciating pain. The attacks are severe enough to disrupt daily activities, but hospitalization is not necessary for most affected individuals.

=== Frequency and duration ===
The average number of attacks per day is around 60, ranging from 3 to 200 times.

The attacks can be divided into three groups: single stabs, groups of stabs, and attacks with saw-tooth pattern, from the shortest to the longest duration respectively. The attacks usually last from five seconds to 240 seconds. Pain is described as excruciating and stabbing, pulsating, electric, or burning in nature. In attacks of longer duration, the pain changes, following a sawtooth pattern characterized by multiple stabs. Typically, longer attacks are more painful due to psychological effects, and patients often feel agitated before and during the attack. They occur mostly in the orbital, supraorbital, or temporal region, but can also occur in the retro-orbital (behind the orbit of the eye) region, side, top, and back of head, second and third trigeminal divisions, teeth, neck, and ear. Only a negligible percentage of attacks (less than 2%) occur at night.

=== Cranial autonomic symptoms associated with headache attacks ===
SUNCT often accompanies cranial autonomic symptoms, including lacrimation (tear flow), ipsilateral ptosis (drooping of the eyelid which is on the same side as the attacks), eyelid edema (swelling due to fluid accumulation), nasal blockage, and conjunctival injection (redness of eye). Depending on which division of the trigeminal nerve innervates the area affected, autonomic symptoms may be less obvious. Short-lasting unilateral neuralgiform headache attacks with cranial autonomic features (SUNA) is a subset of SUNCT that constitutes less than 20% of all reported cases, and may be diagnosed when fewer autonomic symptoms are observed during attacks. Due to the rarity of these conditions, the small number of properly diagnosed patients does not allow for establishing a clear definition. The main difference between SUNCT and SUNA is the clinical presentation of the secondary autonomic symptoms. In SUNCT, both conjunctival injection (red eyes) and lacrimation on the same side of the headache should be present. In SUNA, one or both of these two symptoms are absent, and other autonomic symptoms may be present instead. SUNA attacks may also sometimes be longer, up to 10 minutes in total.

The majority of SUNCT attacks occur chronically; however, some occur episodically. In chronic SUNCT, attacks can occur regularly or irregularly without a distinct refractory period, whereas in episodic SUNCT, attacks occur only for a certain period of time and then cease for another period. Episodes of attacks last from a few days to a few months, and up to 22 attack episodes in one year have been observed. SUNCT can go into remission even after a chronic period, and relapse either spontaneously or due to some stimulus.

=== Triggers of headache attacks ===
Most of the time SUNCT occurs spontaneously; however, attacks can be triggered by simple daily stimuli such as touching the face or scalp, washing, chewing, eating, talking, coughing, blowing nose, or showering. They also can be triggered by light (including sunlight and fluorescent lights) and injuries. Stimuli capable of triggering a cluster headache, including alcohol, smoke, strong smells and a warm environment, can also trigger SUNCT in a few patients. In some cases, patients with episodic SUNCT only exhibit symptoms biannually, in spring and fall. This periodicity suggests that the hypothalamus, which is responsive to day length and photoperiod for regulating circadian and seasonal rhythms, has a role in its triggering.

== Diagnosis ==
SUNCT must be properly distinguished from cluster headaches, since cluster headaches also occur several times per day with separate attacks, and share some common symptoms. However, cluster headaches usually last longer (up to three hours), occur less often (three to five attacks per day), and do not accompany cranial autonomic symptoms. IHS standard criteria for the diagnosis of SUNCT specifically includes pain in the trigeminal division of the face, especially in the orbital region, often with cranial autonomic symptoms which last for relatively short periods of time (from five seconds to several minutes) up to 100 times per day. SUNCT is a major subset of SUNA, which does not accompany cranial symptoms; complete separation between the two is inappropriate since SUNCT does not necessarily always accompany cranial autonomic signs. Exact statistical data is not available due to common mis-diagnosis, and setting up diagnostic criteria is important.

The International Headache Classification established by the International Headache Society criteria for diagnosing SUNCT for therapeutic purposes is:

(i) Type of attack – Attacks of unilateral orbital, supraorbital, or temporal areas from stabbing or pulsating pain accompanied by ipsilateral conjunctival injection and lacrimation
(ii) Number of attacks per day – 3 to 200 attacks per day
(iii) Attack load in minutes per day – 5–240 seconds

Symptoms of SUNCT often lead to misdiagnosis as paroxysmal hemicrania, which is also categorized in the same group. Inefficiency of indomethacin usually indicates SUNCT over paroxysmal hemicrania.

Misdiagnosis and indecisive diagnosis in the past has made it difficult to obtain accurate statistics about SUNCT. Proper diagnosis will broaden data availability and facilitate discovery of new treatment options and useful statistics.

== Pathophysiology ==
The pathophysiology of SUNCT is incompletely understood. Recent studies suggest the existence of a relationship between the hypothalamus and the condition. Functional MRI and deep brain stimulation of a large patient pool showed activation of the posterior hypothalamus during attacks of primary SUNCT, on both sides and contralaterally (on the opposite side). Functional MRI studies suggest brain stem activation during attacks as well. Activation of the trigeminocervical complex and other related structures results from innervation from branches of trigeminal and upper cervical nerves. There exists a direct connection between trigeminal nucleus caudalis, which is located in the brain stem, and the posterior hypothalamus. Therefore, it is possible that stimulation of the peripheral trigeminal nerve activates the hypothalamus and the hypothalamus in turn communicates with the trigeminal nucleus caudalis via neurotransmitters such as orexin.

Elevated levels of prolactin, secretion of which is regulated by the hypothalamus, seem to be associated with SUNCT attacks. Some patients with a pituitary tumor only experience attacks at night. These patients only exhibit higher levels of prolactin at night, even where hormone levels, including prolactin, were normal throughout the day.

SUNCT is considered a primary headache (or condition), but can also occur as a secondary symptom of other conditions. However, a patient can only be diagnosed with SUNCT as a primary condition.

A pituitary tumor causes SUNCT as a secondary headache. Some patients with a pituitary tumor complain of short-lasting heachaches. Upon removal of the tumor, the symptoms of SUNCT may disappear permanently.

Although it occurs very rarely, paranasal sinusitis can also cause secondary SUNCT. The symptoms of SUNCT in such cases can be removed permanently with endoscopic sinus surgery.

== Treatment ==
As diagnostic criteria have been indecisive and its pathophysiology remains unclear, no permanent cure is available. Antiepileptic medications (membrane-stabilizing drugs) such as pregabalin, gabapentin, topiramate, and lamotrigine improve symptoms, but there is no effective permanent or long-term treatment for SUNCT. Lamotrigine exhibits some long-term prevention and reduction in some patients according to case reports and observational studies; however, titration of dose is necessary due to adverse skin reactions. Lamotrigine was found to be the most effective treatment according to a later open-label study, with 56 percent of patients responding to treatment compared to oxcarbazepine (46%), duloxetine (30%), carbamazepine (26%), topiramate (25%), pregabalin and gabapentin (10%).

Intravenous lidocaine can abolish symptoms during its administration, or reduce frequency and duration of attacks. Around 90 percent of patients responded to this treatment in one study. However, administration of intravenous lidocaine requires careful monitoring of ECG and blood pressure. Methylprednisolone therapy shows some promise in short-term prevention of attacks, even though its mechanism of action is yet to be discovered.

The calcium channel blocker verapamil is reported to be useful in alleviating symptoms (lower frequency and duration of attacks), even though some patients experience worsened symptoms.

Various medications that are often used in other headache syndromes such as nonsteroidal anti-inflammatory drugs, acetaminophen, tricyclic antidepressants, calcium channel antagonists do not relieve the symptoms of SUNCT.

There have been attempts to alter oxygen supply during attacks to alleviate the symptoms since some of the headaches are caused by decreased oxygen supply; however, elevated blood oxygen level did not affect the symptoms.

Researchers now focus on the administration of various combination of medications and therapies to treat symptoms of SUNCT.

Ayahuasca and other serotonergic psychedelics have been reported to have suspended symptoms in a patient with SUNCT, analogously to the use of certain psychedelics to successfully treat cluster headaches.

== History ==
In 1977, a 62-year-old male patient was the first to be diagnosed with SUNCT. The patient had experienced unilateral, mild pain in the ocular and periorbital areas since he was 30 years old. The patient started to experience more severe attacks after being struck by a fishing rod in the lower medial supraorbital area when he was 58 years old. The attacks could be provoked by mechanical stimuli and occurred more frequently with symptoms of conjunctival injection, lacrimation, and rhinorrhea. The definitive diagnosis and determination of the role of the trauma (fishing rod strike) could not be made until 10 years later when another similar case occurred. Conditions of the next case ruled out the possibility of SUNCT being a post-traumatic headache.

Bad Brains singer H.R. has this disorder, as revealed by his wife.

== See also ==
- International Classification of Headache Disorders
- Ophthalmodynia periodica
