= List of presidents of the American Osler Society =

This is a list of presidents of the American Osler Society.

== 1970-1980 ==
Name	Term	Comments	Image
William B. Bean	1970-1971	Born in the Philippines, Bean then graduated in medicine from the University of Virginia. His father, Robert Bennett Bean, was a resident under Sir William Osler.	
George T. Harrell	1971-1972	Founding dean of University of Florida College of Medicine in 1954 and Pennsylvania State University’s College of Medicine in 1964.	
Thomas M. Durant	1972-1973	Chair of Medicine of the Temple University School of Medicine from 1956 to 1966.	
John P. McGovern (1921 - 2007)	1973-1974	McGovern was an allergist, real-estate investor and philanthropist.	
Edward C. Rosenow, Jr. (1909-2002)	1974-1975		
A. McGehee Harvey (30 July 1911-8 May 1998)	1975-1976		
Raymond D. Pruitt	1976-1977		
Martin M. Cummings	1977-1978		
Earl F. Nation (1910-2008)	1978-1979		
Irving A. Beck	1979-1980		
Peter D. Olch	1980-1981		

== 1981-1990 ==
Name	Term	Comments	Image
William C. Gibson	1981-1982		
R. Palmer Howard	1982-1983		
Jeremiah A. Barondess	1983-1984		
K. Garth Huston	1984-1985		
William B. Spaulding	1985-1986		
Charles G. Roland	1986-1987		
Robert P. Hudson	1987-1988		
W. Bruce Fye	1988-1989	American cardiologist and medical historian.	
Richard L. Golden	1989-1990		

== 1990-2000 ==
Name	Term	Comments	Image
Jack D. Key	1990-1991		
Paul D. Kligfield	1991-1992		
Alvin E. Rodin	1992-1993		
Robert E. Rakel	1993-1994		
Kenneth M. Ludmerer	1994-1995		
Charles F. Wooley	1995-1996		
Billy F. Andrews	1996-1997		
Eugene H. Conner	1997-1998		
Richard J. Kahn	1998-1999		
Dee J. Canale	1999-2000		

== 2000-2010 ==
Name	Term	Comments	Image
Mark E. Silverman (1939-2008)	2000-2001	Silverman was an American cardiologist and medical historian who founded the cardiology programme at Piedmont Hospital in Atlanta, Georgia.	
John C. Carson	2001-2002		
Lawrence D. Longo	2002-2003		
Marvin J. Stone	2003-2004		
Chester Ray Burns	2004-2005	First American-born physician to receive a doctorate in the history of medicine from the Johns Hopkins University.	
Claus A. Pierach	2005-2006		
Jock Murray	2006-2007	Murray is a professor of medicine (neurology) and professor of medical humanities.	Jock Murray
Francis A. Neelon	2007-2008		
Joseph W. Lella (1936-2020)	2008-2009		
John Noble	2009-2010		

== 2010-2020 ==
Name	Term	Comments	Image
Charles S. Bryan	2010-2011	Bryan was editor of The Journal of the South Carolina Medical Association and the first chief of the Division of Infectious Diseases at the University of South Carolina School of Medicine.	
Michael Bliss	2011-2012		
Sandra W. Moss	2012-2013		
Pamela J. Miller	2013-2014		
Herbert M. Swick	2014-2015		
Paul S. Mueller	2015-2016		
Joseph B. VanderVeer Jr.	2016-2017		
Laurel E. Drevlow	2017-2018		
Clyde Partin, Jr.	2018-2019		
J. Mario Molina	2019-2020		

== 2020 onwards ==
Name	Term	Comments	Image
H. Michael Jones	2020-2021		
Robert G. Mennel	2021-2022		
Christopher J. Boes	2022-2023		
Rolando Del Maestro			
C. Joan Richardson			
