= Indometacin farnesil =

Nonsteroidal anti-inflammatory prodrug

Clinical data
- AHFS/Drugs.com: International Drug Names
- Routes of administration: Oral
- ATC code: None

Legal status
- Legal status: In general: ℞ (Prescription only)

Pharmacokinetic data
- Metabolism: To indometacin
- Elimination half-life: 1.5 hours
- Excretion: Renal

Identifiers
- IUPAC name: (2E,6E)-3,7,11-trimethyldodeca-2,6,10-trien-1-yl [1-(4-chlorobenzoyl)-5-methoxy-2-methyl-1H-indol-3-yl]acetate
- CAS Number: 85801-02-1
- PubChem CID: 5282183
- ChemSpider: 4445378
- UNII: MB2386WGG8
- CompTox Dashboard (EPA): DTXSID9057844
- ECHA InfoCard: 100.242.585

Chemical and physical data
- Formula: C_{34}H_{40}ClNO_{4}
- Molar mass: 562.15 g·mol^{−1}
- 3D model (JSmol): Interactive image
- SMILES: CC1=C(C2=C(N1C(=O)C3=CC=C(C=C3)Cl)C=CC(=C2)OC)CC(=O)OCC=C(C)CCC=C(C)CCC=C(C)C
- InChI: InChI=1S/C34H40ClNO4/c1-23(2)9-7-10-24(3)11-8-12-25(4)19-20-40-33(37)22-30-26(5)36(32-18-17-29(39-6)21-31(30)32)34(38)27-13-15-28(35)16-14-27/h9,11,13-19,21H,7-8,10,12,20,22H2,1-6H3/b24-11+,25-19+; Key:CFIGYZZVJNJVDQ-LMJOQDENSA-N

Indometacin farnesil (INN) is a prodrug of the nonsteroidal anti-inflammatory drug (NSAID) indometacin, designed to reduce the occurrence of side-effects by esterification of the carboxyl group on indometacin with farnesol. Indometacin farnesil was first approved in Japan in 1991, and is available in Japan and Indonesia, under the trade names Infree and Dialon, respectively.
