= David Youngren =

Teacher, author, and philanthropist

David Youngren is a Sweden-born international teacher, author, and philanthropist. Before moving to the United States in 2005, Youngren served as a Christian Pastor of World Harvest Church (Oshawa, ON), and Niagara Celebration Church (St. Catharines, ON) and was the President of World Harvest Bible College, Open Bible Faith Fellowship, and Harvest International Ministries. Youngren has staged large conferences in India, Russia, Albania, Ukraine, Tanzania, Colombia, and South Africa.

Youngren claims to have experienced freedom from cluster headaches during meditation in 2006 that led him on an evolving journey and a new direction in his life and career. David is the founder of Juma’s World — a charity helping orphaned children in Africa.

Youngren is the author or co-author of seven books, including Awakening To I Am Love (2019). David has also created numerous meditation resources, including the Amazing Life (available in English, Spanish, Dutch, and Swahili), and has created a number of films, such The Story (2012), The Story Recut (2013), and Africa Sing Me Your Song (2007).

== Biography ==
Youngren immigrated to Canada from Sweden in 1981 to attend college, and subsequently began full time Christian ministry, primarily in Canada in 1986. He would later travel to Russia, Africa, India and South America for large-scale outreaches.

Youngren founded World Harvest Bible College and World Harvest Church in Oshawa, Ontario, Canada. Youngren served World Harvest Church as pastor for almost nine years.

Youngren served a one-year term as president of Open Bible Faith Fellowship Canada in 2003 before moving to the United States in 2005 before moving to San Diego.

Youngren hosted a radio program and a television program called “Life Without Limits.”

In 2006 Youngren began SaveAfricaNow and produced the documentary film “Africa Sing Me Your Song.” Youngren screened the film to audiences in 2007 and 2008.

In 2012 Youngren released “The Story” which follows a group of volunteers as they travel to Tanzania to help orphans whose parents have died of AIDS.

In January 2012 Youngren founded Gracewave Church in San Diego. In February 2016, Youngren resigned as Pastor due to his evolving beliefs and direction in life.

== Publications ==
- Awakening To I Am Love: How Finding Your True Self Transforms Your Wellbeing, Relationships, and What You Do (Anora Press, 2019) ISBN 978-0-9909171-8-2
- Limitless: Achieve Your Ultimate Vision (digital course)
- Healing Codes (digital course)
- Beyond Limits: 7 Steps to Create the Life of Your Dreams (Believe Media & Publishing, 2016) ISBN 978-0-9909171-1-3
- The Dream Maker's Journal: Achieve Your #1 Goal in 100 Days (Believe Media & Publishing, 2016) ISBN 978-0990917137
- Unravel Love's Mystery: Imagine Your Life Without Guilt, Shame and Fear (Believe Media & Publishing, 2014) ISBN 978-0990917144
- The Amazing Life: 40 Day Journey of Transformation (Believe Media & Publishing, 2013) ISBN 0-9909-1714-2
- Life From The Inside Out (Harvest International Ministries, 2004) ISBN 1-893-30121-4
- The Story (Documentary, 2012)
- Africa Sing Me Your Song (Short Film, 2008)
- A Filmmaker's Search For Revival (DVD)
