= C18H27NO3 =

The molecular formula C_{18}H_{27}NO_{3} (molar mass: 305.41 g/mol) may refer to:

- Capsaicin, the active component of chili peppers
- Droxypropine
- Prosidol
- Zucapsaicin
