= Bean prize =

- Awarded for: History of medicine, humanities
- Sponsored by: American Osler Society
- Country: US

The Bean prize, also known as the William B. Bean Student Research Award and named for William Bennett Bean, is awarded annually to medical students by the American Osler Society (AOS) for research in history of medicine and humanities.

== Background ==
The Bean prize is named for William Bennett Bean, who was a resident physician under Sir William Osler. Bean became the first president of the American Osler Society, who created the award for medical students.
