= Red ear syndrome =

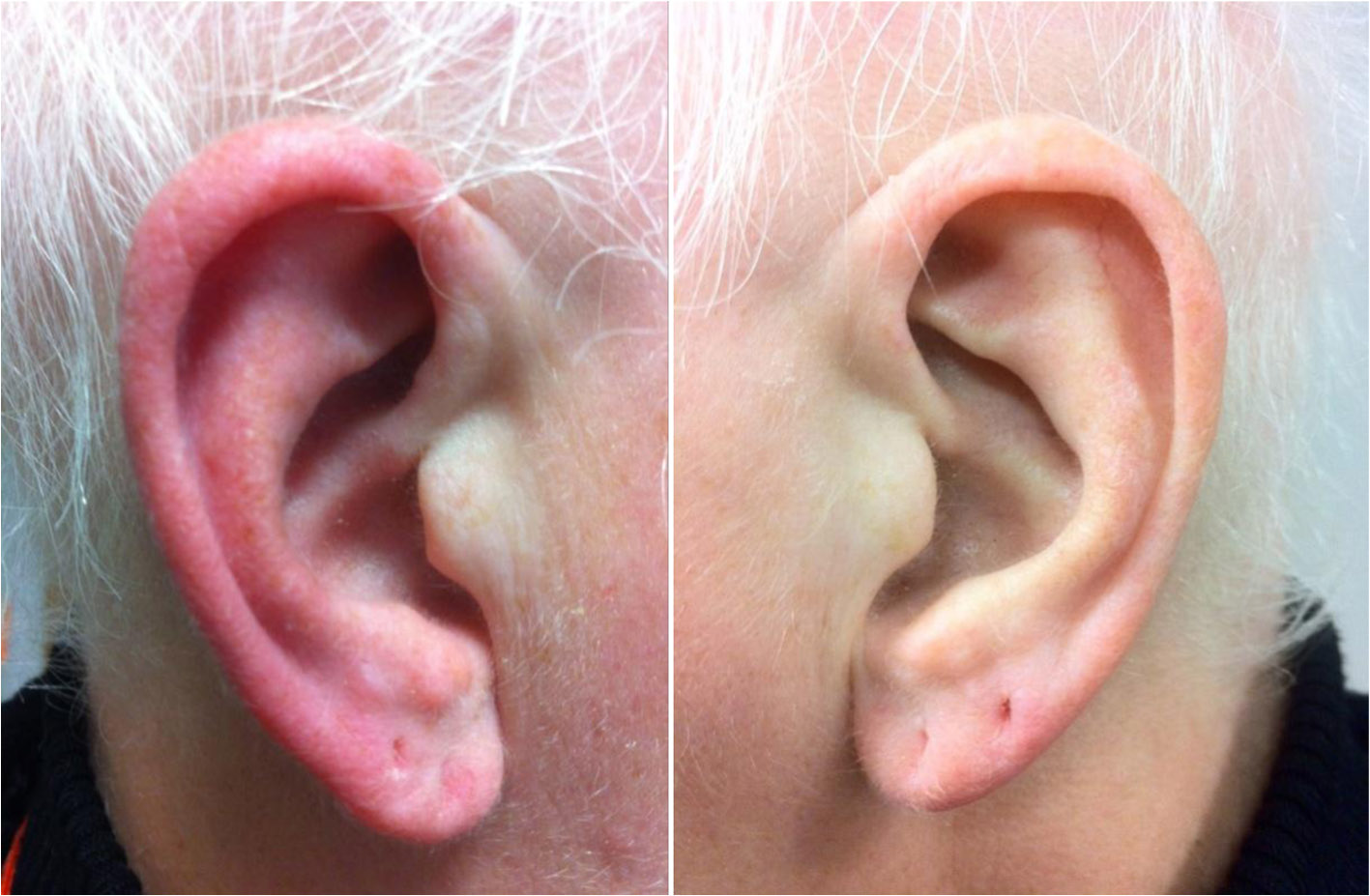
- A red ear syndrome attack, with affected ear on the left

Red ear syndrome (RES) is a rare disorder of unknown etiology which was originally described in 1994. The defining symptom of red ear syndrome is redness of one or both external ears, accompanied by a burning sensation. A variety of treatments have been tried with limited success.

Red ears are also often a classic symptom of relapsing polychondritis (RP), a rare autoimmune disease that attacks various cartilage areas (and sometimes other connective tissue areas) in the body; research estimates that RP affects 3-5 people per million. Red ears in RP indicate inflamed cartilage (and sometimes the skin of the outer ear along with the cartilage) and often cause moderate to extreme pain during “flares” of the disease, which can be acute and/or chronic. Red ears in RP can be bilateral or unilateral, and are described as “earlobe sparing” due to the lack of cartilage in the earlobe. Prolonged inflammation can eventually result in deteriorated ear cartilage (often described as “cauliflower ear” or “floppy ear”), and even partial or total loss of hearing.

== Characteristics ==
Attacks of skin redness and burning sensation or pain in one or both external ears are the only common symptoms. Pain is often most pronounced at the ear lobe, and sometimes radiates to the jawbone and cheek. The pain is normally mild, but has occasionally been described as severe. The attacks can last seconds or hours, with 30 minutes to an hour being typical. Most patients have daily attacks, ranging from 20 a day to a few a year.

== Causes ==
It is believed this syndrome may represent an auriculo-autonomic headache or be part of the group of disorders known as trigeminal autonomic cephalgias, which includes cluster headaches. It is more often associated with migraine in younger people, while late-onset RES may result from pathology of the upper cervical spine or trigeminal autonomic cephalgia. Stress can affect and or cause flare ups.

== Management ==
Red ear syndrome has proven difficult to treat. The most widely attempted medication is gabapentin, with one case series finding that seven of eight patients on gabapentin showed improvement in attack frequency and ear color. Smaller studies have reported some success in certain patients using amitriptyline, flunarizine, imipramine, verapamil, propranolol and ibuprofen. Appropriate medication may differ depending on the underlying cause of the individual's symptoms. Using an ice pack to cool the ear during an attack can provide temporary relief.

== Epidemiology ==
Red ear syndrome is considered rare, but the prevalence is unknown. There are only about 101 cases described in the medical literature, with a male-to-female ratio of 1:1.25. It has been reported in patients from ages 4 to 92, with an average onset at age 42. In multiple tests, researchers revealed that 15% - 20% of children and teens that experience migraines have experienced RES.

== See also ==
- Erythromelalgia
