= Cluster headache =

Neurological disorder

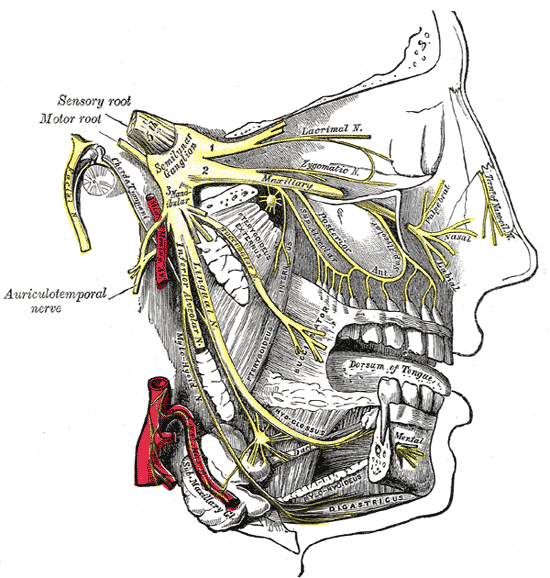
- Trigeminal nerve
- Specialty: Neurology
- Symptoms: Recurrent, severe headaches on one side of the head, eye watering, stuffy nose
- Usual onset: 20 to 40 years old
- Duration: 15 minutes to 3 hours
- Types: Episodic, chronic
- Causes: Unknown
- Risk factors: Tobacco smoke, family history
- Diagnostic method: Based on symptoms
- Differential diagnosis: Migraine, trigeminal neuralgia, other trigeminal autonomic cephalgias
- Prevention: Verapamil, galcanezumab, oral glucocorticoids, steroid injections, civamide
- Treatment: Oxygen therapy, triptans
- Frequency: ~0.1% at some point in time

Cluster headache is a neurological disorder characterized by episodes of severe headaches on one side of the head, typically around the eye and temple, lasting between 15 minutes to three hours. Episodes are often accompanied by eye watering, nasal congestion, drooping eyelids, or swelling around the eye on the affected side. Cluster headaches are unique in their periodicity and regularity: the headaches occur at around the same hour every day during a cluster period, which typically lasts 8–10 weeks a year. Between cluster periods are pain-free intervals without headaches, which last a little less than one year, but some patients can have chronic cluster headaches without remission periods. The disease is considered among the most painful conditions known to medical science.

Cluster headache shows strong circadian and seasonal periodicity, with attacks often recurring at similar times of day, sometimes during sleep, and seasonal peaks in spring and autumn. This has prompted research into the role of the hypothalamus and the body's biological clock.

Triggers of cluster headaches may include alcohol, weather changes, smells, bright/flashing lights, television viewing, and nitroglycerin, among others. Histamine can also precipitate attacks, while a history of exposure to tobacco smoke, whether personal or secondhand, is a risk factor. The underlying cause is unknown, but may include a genetic component, as a family history of migraines increases risk. Structurally, the disease is likely related to dysfunction of the posterior hypothalamus.

The diagnosis is based on the unique pattern of headaches and associated symptoms. There are no specific laboratory tests, physical exam maneuvers, or neuroimaging findings associated with the disease. However, neuroimaging may be required in the case of patients with red flag symptoms, such as a sudden change in the characteristics of the headache.

Recommended management includes lifestyle adaptations, including smoking cessation and avoiding potential triggers. Medical treatments for acute attacks include oxygen or a fast-acting triptan. Preventative medications recommended to decrease the frequency of attacks include steroid injections, galcanezumab, civamide, verapamil, or oral glucocorticoids such as prednisone. Nerve stimulation or surgery may occasionally be used if other measures are not effective.

The condition affects about 0.1% of the general population at some point in their life and 0.05% in any given year. The condition usually first occurs between 20 and 40 years of age. Men are affected about four times more often than women. These debilitating headaches significantly impact daily activities, and due to the severity of the pain, they have also been referred to as "suicide headaches".

== Signs and symptoms ==
Cluster headaches are recurring bouts of severe unilateral headache attacks. The duration of a typical cluster headache ranges from about 15 to 180 minutes. About 75% of untreated attacks last less than 60 minutes. However, women may have longer and more severe cluster headaches.

The onset of an attack is rapid and typically without an aura. Preliminary sensations of pain in the general area of attack, referred to as "shadows", may signal an imminent cluster headache, or these symptoms may linger after an attack has passed, or between attacks. Though cluster headaches are strictly unilateral, there are some documented cases of "side-shift" between cluster periods, or, rarely, simultaneous (within the same cluster period) bilateral cluster headaches.

=== Pain ===
The pain occurs only on one side of the head, around the eye, particularly behind or above the eye, in the temple. The pain is typically greater than in other headache conditions, including migraines, and is usually described as burning, stabbing, drilling or squeezing. While suicide is rare, those with cluster headaches may experience suicidal thoughts (giving the alternative name "suicide headache" or "suicidal headache").

Peter Goadsby, a neuroscientist specialized in cluster headaches, said:

Cluster headache is probably the worst pain that humans experience. I know that's quite a strong remark to make, but if you ask a cluster headache patient if they've had a worse experience, they'll universally say they haven't. Women with cluster headache will tell you that an attack is worse than giving birth. So you can imagine that these people give birth without anesthetic once or twice a day, for six, eight, or ten weeks at a time, and then have a break. It's just awful.

=== Other symptoms ===
The typical symptoms of cluster headache include grouped occurrence and recurrence (cluster) of headache attack, severe unilateral orbital, supraorbital and/or temporal pain. If left untreated, attack frequency may range from one attack every two days to eight attacks per day. Cluster headache attack is accompanied by at least one of the following autonomic symptoms: drooping eyelid, pupil constriction, redness of the conjunctiva, tearing, runny nose and less commonly, facial blushing, swelling, or sweating, typically appearing on the same side of the head as the pain. Similar to a migraine, sensitivity to light (photophobia) or noise (hyperacusis) may occur during a cluster headache. Nausea is a rare symptom although it has been reported.

Restlessness (for example, pacing or rocking back and forth) may occur. Secondary effects may include the inability to organize thoughts and plans, physical exhaustion, confusion, agitation, aggressiveness, depression, and anxiety.

People with cluster headaches may dread facing another headache and adjust their physical or social activities around a possible future occurrence. Likewise they may seek assistance to accomplish what would otherwise be normal tasks. They may hesitate to make plans because of the regularity, or conversely, the unpredictability of the pain schedule. These factors can lead to generalized anxiety disorders, panic disorder, serious depressive disorders, social withdrawal and isolation.

Cluster headaches have been recently associated with obstructive sleep apnea comorbidity.

=== Recurrence ===
Cluster headaches may occasionally be referred to as "alarm clock headache" because of the regularity of their recurrence. Cluster headaches often awaken individuals from sleep. Both individual attacks and the cluster grouping can have a metronomic regularity; attacks typically strike at a precise time of day each morning or night. The recurrence of headache cluster grouping may occur more often around solstices, or seasonal changes, sometimes showing circannual periodicity. Conversely, attack frequency may be highly unpredictable, showing no periodicity at all. These observations have prompted researchers to speculate an involvement or dysfunction of the hypothalamus. The hypothalamus controls the body's "biological clock" and circadian rhythm. In episodic cluster headache, attacks occur once or more daily, often at the same time each day for a period of several weeks, followed by a headache-free period lasting weeks, months, or years. Approximately 10–15% of cluster headaches are chronic, with multiple headaches occurring every day for years, sometimes without any remission.

In accordance with the International Headache Society (IHS) diagnostic criteria, cluster headaches occurring in two or more cluster periods, lasting from 7 to 365 days with a pain-free remission of one month or longer between the headache attacks may be classified as episodic. If headache attacks occur for more than a year without pain-free remission of at least three months, the condition is classified as chronic. Chronic cluster headaches both occur and recur without any remission periods between cycles; there may be variation in cycles, meaning the frequency and severity of attacks may change without predictability for a period of time. The frequency, severity, and duration of headache attacks experienced by people during these cycles varies between individuals and does not demonstrate complete remission of the episodic form. The condition may change unpredictably from chronic to episodic and from episodic to chronic.

== Causes ==
Positron emission tomography (PET) shows brain areas being activated during pain.
Voxel-based morphometry shows brain area structural differences.

The specific causes and pathogenesis of cluster headaches are not fully understood. The Third Edition of the International Classification of Headache disorders classifies cluster headaches as belonging to the trigeminal autonomic cephalalgias.

Some experts consider the posterior hypothalamus to be important in the pathogenesis of cluster headaches. This is supported by a relatively high success ratio of deep-brain stimulation therapy on the posterior hypothalamic grey matter.

In a 2012 U.S. survey of 1,134 people with cluster headache, reported attack triggers included beer (57%), red wine (50%), hard liquor (49%), weather changes (36%), smells (28%), bright lights (23%), flashing lights (17%), television viewing (12%), hot wraps or hot showers (8%), and nitroglycerin (3%).

=== Nerves ===
Therapies acting on the vagus nerve (cranial nerve X) and the greater occipital nerve have both shown efficacy in managing cluster headache, but the specific roles of these nerves are not well-understood. Two nerves thought to play an important role in cluster headaches include the trigeminal nerve and the facial nerve.

=== Genetics ===
Cluster headache may run in some families in an autosomal dominant inheritance pattern. People with a first degree relative with the condition are about 14–48 times more likely to develop it themselves, and around 8 to 10% of persons with cluster headaches have a family history. Several studies have found a higher number of relatives affected among females. Others have suggested these observations may be due to lower numbers of females in these studies. Possible genetic factors warrant further research, current evidence for genetic inheritance is limited.

Genes that are thought to play a role in the disease are the hypocretin/orexin receptor type 2 (HCRTR2), alcohol dehydrogenase 4 (ADH4), β3 subunit of G proteins (GNB3), pituitary adenylate cyclase-activating polypeptide type I receptor (ADCYAP1R1), and membrane metallo-endopeptidase (MME) genes.

=== Tobacco smoking ===
About 65% of persons with cluster headache are, or have been, tobacco smokers. Stopping smoking does not lead to improvement of the condition, and cluster headaches also occur in those who have never smoked (e.g., children); it is thought unlikely that smoking is a cause. People with cluster headaches may be predisposed to certain traits, including smoking or other lifestyle habits.

=== Hypothalamus ===
A review suggests that the suprachiasmatic nucleus of the hypothalamus, which is the major biological clock in the human body, may be involved in cluster headaches, because cluster headaches occur with diurnal and seasonal rhythmicity.

Positron emission tomography (PET) scans indicate the brain areas which are activated during attack only, compared to pain free periods. These pictures show brain areas that are active during pain in yellow/orange color (called "pain matrix"). The area in the center (in all three views) is activated only during cluster headaches. The bottom row voxel-based morphometry shows structural brain differences between individuals with and without CH; only a portion of the hypothalamus is different.

== Diagnosis ==
Cluster-like head pain may be diagnosed as secondary headache rather than cluster headache.

A detailed oral history aids practitioners in correct differential diagnosis, as there are no confirmatory tests for cluster headache. A headache diary can be useful in tracking when and where pain occurs, how severe it is, and how long the pain lasts. A record of coping strategies used may help distinguish between headache type; data on frequency, severity and duration of headache attacks are a necessary tool for initial and correct differential diagnosis in headache conditions.

The Erwin test is a 3-item screening questionnaire assessing pain intensity, attack duration and the presence of autonomic symptoms. It has been described as an easy-to-use tool that could facilitate earlier diagnosis. An interactive version of the Erwin test is available online.

Correct diagnosis presents a challenge as the first cluster headache attack may present where staff are not trained in the diagnosis of rare or complex chronic disease. Experienced ER staff are sometimes trained to detect headache types. While cluster headache attacks themselves are not directly life-threatening, suicidal ideation has been observed.

Individuals with cluster headaches typically experience diagnostic delay before correct diagnosis. People are often misdiagnosed due to reported neck, tooth, jaw, and sinus symptoms and may unnecessarily endure many years of referral to ear, nose and throat (ENT) specialists for investigation of sinuses; dentists for tooth assessment; chiropractors and manipulative therapists for treatment; or psychiatrists, psychologists, and other medical disciplines before their headaches are correctly diagnosed. Under-recognition of cluster headaches by health care professionals is reflected in consistent findings in Europe and the United States that the average time to diagnosis is around seven years.

=== Differential ===
Cluster headache may be misdiagnosed as migraine or sinusitis. Other types of headache are sometimes mistaken for, or may mimic closely, cluster headaches. Incorrect terms like "cluster migraine" confuse headache types, confound differential diagnosis and are often the cause of unnecessary diagnostic delay, ultimately delaying appropriate specialist treatment.

Other types of headaches that may be confused with cluster headache include:

- Chronic paroxysmal hemicrania is a unilateral headache condition, without the male predominance usually seen in cluster headaches. Paroxysmal hemicrania may also be episodic but the episodes of pain seen in chronic paroxysmal hemicrania are usually shorter than those seen with cluster headaches. Chronic paroxysmal hemicrania typically responds "absolutely" to treatment with the anti-inflammatory drug indomethacin where in most cases cluster headaches typically show no indomethacin response, making "indomethacin response" an important diagnostic tool for specialist practitioners seeking correct differential diagnosis between the conditions.
- Hemicrania continua
- Short-lasting unilateral neuralgiform headache with conjunctival injection and tearing (SUNCT) is a headache syndrome belonging to the group of TACs.
- Trigeminal neuralgia is a unilateral headache syndrome, or "cluster-like" headache.

== Prevention ==
Management for cluster headache is divided into three primary categories: abortive, transitional, and preventive. Preventive treatments are used to reduce or eliminate cluster headache attacks; they are generally used in combination with abortive and transitional techniques.

=== Verapamil ===
The recommended first-line preventive therapy is verapamil, a calcium channel blocker. Verapamil was previously underused in people with cluster headache. Improvement can be seen in an average of 1.7 weeks for episodic cluster headache and 5 weeks for chronic cluster headache when using a dosage of ranged between 160 and 720 mg (mean 240 mg/day). Preventive therapy with verapamil is believed to work because it has an effect on the circadian rhythm and on CGRPs as CGRP-release is controlled by voltage-gated calcium channels.

=== Glucocorticoids ===
Since these compounds are steroids, there is little evidence to support long-term benefits from glucocorticoids, but they may be used until other medications take effect as they appear to be effective at three days. They are generally discontinued after 8–10 days of treatment. Prednisone is given at a starting dose of 60–80 milligrams daily; then it is reduced by 5 milligrams every day. Corticosteroids are also used to break cycles, especially in chronic patients.

=== Surgery ===
Nerve stimulators may be an option in the small number of people who do not improve with medications. Two procedures, deep brain stimulation or occipital nerve stimulation, may be useful; early experience shows a benefit in about 60% of cases. It typically takes weeks or months for this benefit to appear. A non-invasive method using transcutaneous electrical nerve stimulation (TENS) is being studied.

A number of surgical procedures, such as a rhizotomy or microvascular decompression, may also be considered, but evidence to support them is limited and there are cases of people whose symptoms worsen after these procedures.

=== Other ===
Lithium, methysergide, and topiramate are recommended alternative treatments, although there is little evidence supporting the use of topiramate or methysergide. This is also true for tianeptine, melatonin, and ergotamine. Valproate, sumatriptan, and oxygen are not recommended as preventive measures. Botulinum toxin injections have shown limited success. Evidence for baclofen, botulinum toxin, and capsaicin is unclear.

== Management ==
There are two primary treatments for acute CH: oxygen and triptans, but they are underused due to misdiagnosis of the syndrome. During bouts of headaches, triggers such as alcohol, nitroglycerine, and naps during the day should be avoided. Bright light or glare and television viewing have also been described as potential triggers of cluster headache attacks.

=== Oxygen ===
Oxygen therapy may help to abort attacks, though it does not prevent future episodes. Typically it is given via a non-rebreather mask at 12–15 liters per minute for 15–20 minutes. One review found about 70% of patients improve within 15 minutes. The evidence for effectiveness of 100% oxygen, however, is weak. Hyperbaric oxygen at pressures of ~2 times greater than atmospheric pressure may relieve cluster headaches.

=== Triptans ===
The other primarily recommended treatment of acute attacks is subcutaneous or intranasal sumatriptan. Sumatriptan and zolmitriptan have both been shown to improve symptoms during an attack with sumatriptan being superior. Because of the vasoconstrictive side-effect of triptans, they may be contraindicated in people with ischemic heart disease. The vasoconstrictor ergot compounds may be useful, but have not been well studied in acute attacks.

=== Opioids ===
The use of opioid medication in management of cluster headache is not recommended and may make headache syndromes worse. Long-term opioid use is associated with well known dependency, addiction, and withdrawal syndromes. Prescription of opioid medication may additionally lead to further delay in differential diagnosis, undertreatment, and mismanagement.

=== Other ===
Intranasal lidocaine (sprayed in the ipsilateral nostril) may be an effective treatment with patient resistant to more conventional treatment.

Octreotide administered subcutaneously has been demonstrated to be more effective than placebo for the treatment of acute attacks.

Sub-occipital steroid injections have shown benefit and are recommended for use as a transitional therapy to provide temporary headache relief as more long term prophylactic therapies are instituted.

A 2024 research found that exercise could relieve CH pain for significant percentage of people.

== Epidemiology ==
Cluster headache affects about 0.1% of the general population at some point in their life. Males are affected about four times more often than females. The condition usually starts between the ages of 20 and 50 years, although it can occur at any age. About one in five affected adults report the onset of cluster headache between 10 and 19 years of age.

== History ==
The first complete description of cluster headache was given by the London neurologist Wilfred Harris in 1926, who named the disease migrainous neuralgia. Descriptions of cluster headache date to 1745 and probably earlier.

The condition was originally named Horton's cephalalgia after Bayard Taylor Horton, a US neurologist who postulated the first theory as to their pathogenesis. His original paper describes the severity of the headaches as being able to take normal men and force them to attempt or die by suicide; his 1939 paper said:

Our patients were disabled by the disorder and suffered from bouts of pain from two to twenty times a week. They had found no relief from the usual methods of treatment. Their pain was so severe that several of them had to be constantly watched for fear of suicide. Most of them were willing to submit to any operation which might bring relief.

CH has alternately been called erythroprosopalgia of Bing, ciliary neuralgia, erythromelalgia of the head, Horton's headache, histaminic cephalalgia, petrosal neuralgia, sphenopalatine neuralgia, vidian neuralgia, Sluder's neuralgia, Sluder's syndrome, and hemicrania angioparalyticia.

== Society and culture ==
Robert Shapiro, a professor of neurology, says that while cluster headaches are about as common as multiple sclerosis with a similar disability level, as of 2013, the US National Institutes of Health had spent $1.872 billion on research into multiple sclerosis in one decade, but less than $2 million on cluster headache research in 25 years.

== Research directions ==
Some case reports suggest that ingesting lysergamides such as LSD, tryptamines such as psilocybin (as found in hallucinogenic mushrooms), or DMT can abort attacks and interrupt cluster headache cycles. The hallucinogen DMT has a chemical structure that is similar to the triptan sumatriptan, indicating a possible shared mechanism in preventing or stopping migraine and TACs. In a 2006 survey of 53 individuals, 18 of 19 psilocybin users reported extended remission periods. The survey was not a blinded or a controlled study, and was "limited by recall and selection bias". The safety and efficacy of psilocybin is currently being studied in cluster headache, with the extension phase of one randomized controlled trial demonstrating reduced cluster attack burden after a 3-dose pulse of psilocybin. In Canada, a first cluster headache patient was granted approval to receive treatment with psilocybin under the country's Special Access Program.

Fremanezumab, a humanized monoclonal antibody directed against calcitonin gene-related peptides alpha and beta, was in phase 3 clinical trials for cluster headaches, but the studies were stopped early due to a futility analysis demonstrating that a successful outcome was unlikely.

Precision-tinted lenses have been investigated as a possible treatment for light-sensitive cluster headache, but evidence is limited to case-report data and further research is needed to determine their effectiveness.
