= Trigeminal autonomic cephalgia =

- Specialty: Neurology

Trigeminal autonomic cephalalgia (TAC) refers to a group of primary headaches that occurs with pain on one side of the head in the trigeminal nerve area and symptoms in autonomic systems on the same side, such as eye watering and redness or drooping eyelids.

== Types ==
TACs include

- Cluster headache
- Paroxysmal hemicrania (chronic or episodic)
- Short-lasting unilateral neuralgiform headache attacks with conjunctival injection and tearing (SUNCT)
- Short-lasting unilateral neuralgiform headache attacks with cranial autonomic symptoms (SUNA)
- Long-lasting autonomic symptoms with hemicrania (LASH)

TACs can be differentiated by the length and frequency of recurrence of the headaches.

== Treatment ==
Treatment for TACs varies depending on the exact type, but can include medication such as indomethacin (in the case of chronic paroxysmal hemicrania) or acute and prophylactic therapy (in the case of cluster headache).
