= Venous lake =

Type of papule usually on the lip, face or ears and among the elderly

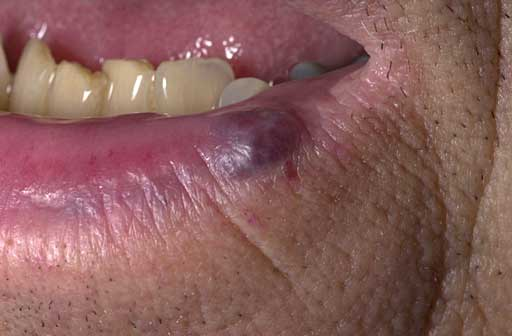
- Venous lake of the lip
- Specialty: Dermatology

A venous lake (also known as phlebectasis) is a generally solitary, soft, compressible, dark blue to violaceous, 0.2- to 1-cm papule commonly found on sun-exposed surfaces of the vermilion border of the lip, face and ears. Lesions generally occur among the elderly.

Though these lesions may resemble nodular melanoma, the lack of induration, slow growth, and lightening appearance upon diascopy suggest against it, and indicate a vascular lesion. Additionally, lack of pulsation distinguishes this lesion of the lower lip from a tortuous segment of the inferior labial artery.

== Cause ==
The cause is unknown; however it is thought to be associated with sun exposure, leading to a dilated blood-filled vascular channel "...lined with a singled layer of flattened endothelial cells and a thin wall of fibrous tissue filled with red blood cells."

== Treatment ==
Treatment may be requested for cosmetic reasons. Traditional techniques such as surgical excision are effective but will leave a scar. Laser therapy has become the mainstay of therapy. Published research suggests that the Long Pulsed Nd:YAG laser is a very effective, with a clearance rate of 94% following a single treatment. In this study no scarring or other complications were reported.

== History ==
The term was coined by American physician William Bennett Bean.

== Images ==
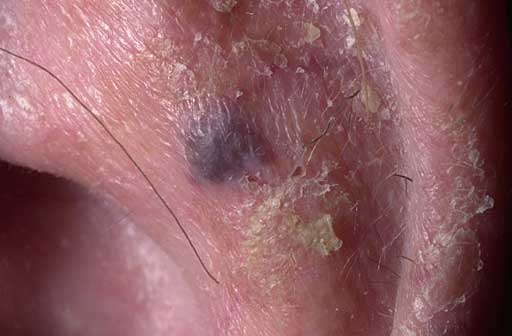
Venous lake of the ear

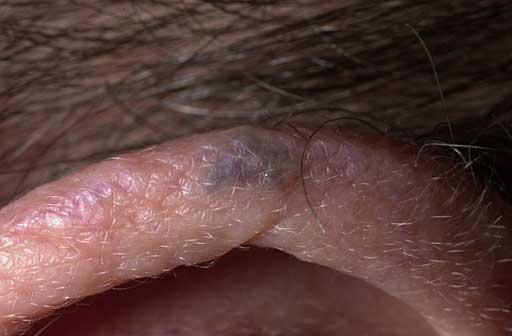
Venous lake of the ear

== See also ==
- List of cutaneous conditions
