= Zucapsaicin =

Chemical compound

Clinical data
- Trade names: Civanex
- Other names: Civamide; (Z)-Capsaicin; cis-Capsaicin
- Routes of administration: Topical
- ATC code: M02AB02 (WHO)

Legal status
- Legal status: CA: ℞-only

Identifiers
- IUPAC name: (Z)-N-[(4-Hydroxy-3-methoxyphenyl)methyl]-8-methylnon-6-enamide
- CAS Number: 25775-90-0
- PubChem CID: 1548942
- DrugBank: DB09120
- ChemSpider: 1265956
- UNII: 15OX67P384
- KEGG: D06388
- ChEBI: CHEBI:135952
- ChEMBL: ChEMBL313971
- CompTox Dashboard (EPA): DTXSID101014453
- ECHA InfoCard: 100.164.527

Chemical and physical data
- Formula: C_{18}H_{27}NO_{3}
- Molar mass: 305.418 g·mol^{−1}
- 3D model (JSmol): Interactive image
- SMILES: Oc1ccc(cc1OC)CNC(CCCC\C=C/C(C)C)=O
- InChI: InChI=1S/C18H27NO3/c1-14(2)8-6-4-5-7-9-18(21)19-13-15-10-11-16(20)17(12-15)22-3/h6,8,10-12,14,20H,4-5,7,9,13H2,1-3H3,(H,19,21)/b8-6-; Key:YKPUWZUDDOIDPM-VURMDHGXSA-N

Zucapsaicin (Civanex) is a medication used to treat osteoarthritis of the knee and other neuropathic pain. Zucapsaicin is a member of phenols and a member of methoxybenzenes. It is a modulator of transient receptor potential cation channel subfamily V member 1 (TRPV-1), also known as the vanilloid or capsaicin receptor 1 that reduces pain, and improves articular functions. It is the cis-isomer of capsaicin. Civamide, manufactured by Winston Pharmaceuticals, is produced in formulations for oral, nasal, and topical use (patch and cream).

Zucapsaicin has been tested for treatment of a variety of conditions associated with ongoing nerve pain. This includes herpes simplex infections; cluster headaches and migraine; and knee osteoarthritis. It was approved by the Health Canada in 2010 as topical cream sold under the brand name Zuacta. It has a melting point of 71.5–74.5 °C (160.7–166.1 °F).

== Pharmacology ==
Zucapsaicin mediates an antinociceptive action via acting as an agonist at TRPV1. TRPV1 play an important physiological role of transducing chemical, mechanical and thermal stimuli as well as pain transduction, and participate in pain modulation and perception. They are mainly distributed in C sensory nerve fibers as well as Aẟ fibers to transmit sensory information involving inflammatory and neuropathic pain, and activation of these channels releases somatostatin, calcitonin gene-related peptide (CGRP) and other neuropeptides (neurokinin A, kassinin), leading to neurogenic inflammation [A19720]. Zucapsaicin is also reported to affect the peptidergic afferent neurons via a desensitization mechanism to decrease the levels of dorsal root ganglia and sciatic calcitonin gene-related peptide (CGRP) and substance P (SP) [L877].

== Pharmacodynamics ==
Zucapsaicin mediates an antinociceptive action via acting as an agonist at TRPV1. TRPV1 play an important physiological role of transducing chemical, mechanical and thermal stimuli as well as pain transduction, and participate in pain modulation and perception. They are mainly distributed in C sensory nerve fibers as well as Aẟ fibers to transmit sensory information involving inflammatory and neuropathic pain, and activation of these channels releases somatostatin, calcitonin gene-related peptide (CGRP) and other neuropeptides (neurokinin A, kassinin), leading to neurogenic inflammation. Zucapsaicin is also reported to affect the peptidergic afferent neurons via a desensitization mechanism to decrease the levels of dorsal root ganglia and sciatic calcitonin gene-related peptide (CGRP) and substance P (SP).

== Mechanism of action ==
Zucapsaicin excites and desensitizes C-fibers via agonist at TRPV1 on nociceptive neurons. It binds to intracellular sites and initially stimulates the channels, causing burning sensation. The mechanism of pharmacological action of zucapsaicin has not been fully understood yet. It is suggested that this compound, similarly to its trans isomer, is an agonist of the vanilloid receptor VR1 (TRPV1) and a neuronal calcium channel blocker. Capsaicin is able to excite and desensitize C-fibers. As such, it is not only able to cause pain, but also exhibit analgesic properties. Initially, it stimulates TRPV1, which is responsible for a burning sensation. This effect is followed by a longlasting refractory state – ‘desensitization’ – during which the previously excited sensory neurons become unresponsive to capsaicin and other stimuli. It was shown that desensitization and tachyphylaxis of TRPV1 channels contribute to capsaicin-induced pain relief. Desensitization of TRPV1 represents the main mechanism of its inhibitory function.

Three distinct pathways of capsaicin-induced desensitization have been described: i) activation of calcineurin, which results in dephosphorylation of TRPV1; ii) activation of phospholipase C with the subsequent phosphatidylinositol 4,5-biphosphate hydrolysis (rather controversial) and iii) activation of calcium-dependent protein kinase C isoforms and subsequent channel phosphorylation. Desensitization involves both tachyphylaxis (short-term desensitization) and long-term, persistent, desensitization. It is suggested that the downregulation of proalgesic substances (such as SP) and upregulation of analgesic peptides are implicated in desensitization. The exhaustion of SP reserves renders neurons desensitized and refractory. These mechanisms of desensitization are not fully understood. It is thought that the short-term desensitization is related to capsaicin's ability to block the intra-axonal transport of NGF, SP and somatostatin.

The desensitization is a reversible phenomenon. It begins a few hours after capsaicin application and may last even several weeks. The reversible desensitization was found useful in the treatment of pain, whereas the site-specific ablation of sensory nerves transmitting pain stimuli is a promising approach (‘molecular scalpel’) to achieve a permanent pain relief in patients suffering from bone cancer pain or HIV-induced neuropathies. Desensitization and depletion of pronociceptive neurotransmitters induce chemical denervation with a loss of function, which is clinically used in osteoarthritis, diabetic neuropathy, psoriasis and others. In dorsal root ganglia and the sciatic nerve, zucapsaicin decreases levels of SP and CGRP, indicating that it influences peptidergic afferent neurons via a desensitization mechanism[41]. When administered topically, the intended targets for zucapsaicin are the neurons that innervate the local area of application. These neurons transmit pain toward the CNS.

== Pharmacokinetics ==
=== Absorption ===
Zucapsaicin displays low systemic absorption and localizes at the area of application. In animal studies, systemic absorption is 0.075%.

=== Metabolism ===
In vitro studies demonstrates weak to moderate inhibitory effects on various cytochrome P450 enzymes, although not clinically significant due to low systemic absorption.

=== Route of elimination ===
In rat studies, zucapsaicin and its metabolites are slowly excreted into urine and feces (up to 2/3), with minimal elimination via exhalation following dermal administration.

=== Half life ===
In rats, the elimination half life of zucapsaicin and its metabolites is approximately 7 to 11 hours.

== Toxicity ==
Most common adverse effects involved application site reactions such as transient burning and warm sensation. Other adverse effects observed in clinical trials are eye irritation, arthralgia, aggravated osteoarthritis, burning sensation, headache, cough and sneezing. Oral LD50 in mouse is >87.5 mg/kg in male and <60 mg/kg in females. Oral LD50 in rats is >90 mg/kg in males and >60 mg/kg in females.

== Chemical and Physical Properties ==
=== Computed properties ===
Property Name	Property Value
Molecular Weight	305.418 g/mol
XLogP3-AA	3.6
Hydrogen Bond Donor Count	2
Hydrogen Bond Acceptor Count	3
Rotatable Bond Count	9
Exact Mass	305.199 g/mol
Monoisotopic Mass	305.199 g/mol
Topological Polar Surface Area	58.6 A^2
Heavy Atom Count	22
Formal Charge	0
Complexity	341
Isotope Atom Count	0
Defined Atom Stereocenter Count	0
Undefined Atom Stereocenter Count	0
Defined Bond Stereocenter Count	1
Undefined Bond Stereocenter Count	0
Covalently-Bonded Unit Count	1
Compound Is Canonicalized	Yes
