= Henry W. Woltman Award =

Henry Woltman Award
- Awarded for: Neurology
- Date: 1966
- Location: Mayo Clinic, Rochester, Minnesota
- Country: US

The Henry Woltman Award is an annual medical prize in neurology, first awarded to Leonard Robin Carney in 1966 by the Mayo Clinic, Rochester, Minnesota. It is named for neurologist Henry Woltman with the purpose of honouring a “fellow or resident in the neurological sciences who demonstrates superior ability and performance in the field of clinical neurology in regard to careful observation of clinical phenomena, sympathetic care of patients and initiative in teaching of clinical neurology.”
