= Chronic paroxysmal hemicrania =

- Other names: Sjaastad syndrome
- Specialty: Neurology

Chronic paroxysmal hemicrania (CPH) is a severe debilitating unilateral headache usually affecting the area around the eye. It normally consists of multiple severe, yet short, headache attacks affecting only one side of the cranium. Retrospective surveys indicated that paroxysmal hemicrania was more common in women. However, subsequent prospective research showed an equal prevalence between females and males, with a ratio close to 1:1. Unlike in migraine, it has no neurological symptoms associated with it. CPH headaches are treated through the use of non-steroidal anti-inflammatory drugs, with indomethacin found to be especially effective in eliminating symptoms.

Paroxysmal hemicrania is classified by the characteristic (high) frequency and (short) duration of attacks experienced by patients that is somewhat similar to cluster headaches, despite some important differences explained below. Episodic paroxysmal hemicrania attacks occur at least twice a year and last anywhere from seven days to a year with pain free periods of a month or longer separating them. Chronic paroxysmal hemicrania attacks occur over the course of more than a year without remission or with remissions lasting less than a month.

== Signs and symptoms ==
Individuals with CPH suffer multiple short, severe headaches a day, often more than five, with most lasting between 5 and 30 minutes each. When compared to cluster headaches, CPH attacks are typically shorter. Each headache is centered around the eye, temple and forehead or the back of the head and is localized to one side of the head. While redness and watering of the eye are associated with CPH, patients typically do not experience nausea or vomiting. Although less common, CPH may also present as severe unilateral ear pain accompanied by autonomic symptoms. Autonomic symptoms may include the presence of red ear syndrome.

Attacks hit the patient many times a day, from 5 times a day up to 40 times a day with an average of 11 a day. Mild background pain can persist between attacks. They come in bouts that last from 7 days to 1 year separated by remission periods that can last more than 3 months in episodic patients, or less than 3 months in chronic patients. Onset is in adulthood and the disorder may last indefinitely or spontaneously go into remission. Circadian mechanisms are likely involved in paroxysmal hemicrania due to its highly cyclic nature. No particular circannual recurrence characterizes symptomatic periods, although some patients can experience a seasonal preponderance.

== Causes ==
The causes of paroxysmal hemicrania are ultimately still unknown. Sympathetic symptoms such as miosis and ptosis might be linked with a generalized sympathetic dysfunction. Neuropathic mechanisms may be involved, since attacks can be triggered by mechanical stimulation. Perivascular neurogenic inflammatory processes can worsen symptoms or increase pain. Dilated blood vessels may contribute in stimulating trigeminal nociceptors directly, although they cannot be the origin of pain, since even suppression of vasodilation does not stop it once it’s started.

Many secondary conditions have been reported to be possible causes of CPH, according to Mehta et al., most of which are arterial abrasions or tumors. These include aneurysms in the circle of Willis, middle cerebral artery infarction, parietal arteriovenous malformation, cavernous sinus and petrous ridge meningiomas, pituitary adenoma, Pancoast tumor, gangliocytoma of the sella turcica, and malignant frontal tumors. This accentuates the urgency for those diagnosed with CPH to receive an MRI head scan.

== Diagnosis ==
The temporal branch of the facial nerve is immediately above the eye.

CPH is a long-term disease with symptoms lasting for longer than a year, either without remission or with remissions that last less than a month. In order to be diagnosed with CPH, a patient needs to have had at least 20 attacks filling the following criteria:

- Attacks of severe unilateral orbital, supraorbital, or temporal pain lasting between 2 and 30 minutes.
- The headache needs to take place with one of the following:
  - Ipsilateral conjunctival injection and/or lacrimation
  - Ipsilateral nasal congestion and/or rhinorrhoea
  - Ipsilateral eyelid oedema
  - Ipsilateral forehead and facial sweating
  - Ipsilateral miosis and/or ptosis
- Attacks need to occur more than five times a day for more than half of the time, although periods of lower frequency can occur.
- The symptoms cannot be attributed to another disorder.
- Attacks can be prevented completely by therapeutic doses of indomethacin.

In addition, diagnosis of CPH requires that neuropathy of the supraorbital area in the temporal branch of the facial nerve be ruled out.

=== Comparison to cluster headaches ===
Though outwardly similar to cluster headaches, chronic paroxysmal hemicrania is rather different, and the two headaches are not a subset of one or the other. Key differences include:

- CPH attacks occur more frequently, but are shorter.
- Individuals with CPH are far more responsive to indomethacin than individuals with cluster headaches.
- CPH attacks can be provoked by neck movement.
- In a study conducted by Sjaastad, heating a patient's body will cause the painful side of the forehead to sweat more in CPH patients, while there will be less sweating on that side for those suffering from cluster headaches.

== Treatments ==
A ten-patient study conducted by Pareja et al. found that all patients diagnosed with CPH were responsive to indomethacin and were able to completely control their symptoms. Doses of the drug ranged from 25 mg per day to 150 mg per day with a median dose of 75 mg per 24-hour period. Almost all cases of CPH respond positively and effectively to indometacin, but as much as 25 percent of patients discontinued use of the drug due to adverse side effects, namely complications in the gastrointestinal tract.

Use of topiramate has also been found to be an effective treatment for CPH, but cluster headache medications have been found to have little effect.

== Epidemiology ==
Although CPH is often compared to cluster headaches, it is much less prevalent, occurring in only 1–3% of those who experience cluster headaches. CPH occurs roughly in 1 in 50,000 people, while cluster headaches are comparatively more common and are found in 1 in 1000 people. Cluster headaches occur primarily in men, while CPH is more commonly diagnosed in women. The female to male ratio of diagnosed patients can range anywhere from 1.6:1 to 2.36:1. However, more recent prospective research showed an equal prevalence between females and males, with a ratio close to 1:1. Symptoms may begin to appear at any age, but onset usually occurs in adulthood with a mean starting age within the thirties.

== History ==
CPH was discovered by Norwegians Ottar Sjaastad and Inge Dale in 1974. The term chronic paroxysmal hemicrania was first used in 1976 by Sjaastad to describe a condition seen in two of their patients who were experiencing repeated solitary and limited daily headache attacks on only one side of the cranium.

It is possible that chronic paroxysmal hemicrania was first described by Johann Oppermann in 1747 under the term "hemicranias horologica". Oppermann's report included a 35-year-old woman who had hemicranial pain that lasted for 15 minutes and recurred regularly every hour.

CPH has been included in the International Headache Society's classification system since 1988.

== See also ==
- Hemicrania continua
- Rebound headaches
- Tension headaches
- Trigeminal neuralgia
