= Lawrence C. McHenry Jr. =

American professor of neurology

Lawrence C. McHenry

Lawrence Chester McHenry Jr. (20 March 1929-22 February 1985), was an American professor of neurology at the Wake Forest University, North Carolina. The American Academy of Neurology award a history of neurology prize in his name.

== Selected publications ==
- McHenry, Lawrence C.; MacKeith, Ronald (October 1966). "Samuel Johnson's childhood illnesses and the King's evil". Medical History. 10 (4): 386–399. doi:10.1017/S0025727300011492. ISSN 2048-8343. PMC 1033643. PMID 5331695.
- McHenry, Lawrence C (June 1985). "Neurological Disorders of Dr Samuel Johnson". Journal of the Royal Society of Medicine. 78 (6): 485–491. doi:10.1177/014107688507800613. ISSN 0141-0768. PMC 1289780. PMID 3889335.
