= Intercalated seizure =

Migraine-triggered epilepsy

An intercalated seizure is an epileptic seizure that occurs during the aura stage of a migraine. It has been found, in some cases, that this type of seizure is instigated by the migraine preceding it, coining the term "migraine-triggered seizure". In order to be considered such, the victim must have already had certified migraines with aura and a seizure must occur within one hour after the beginning of the aura. The neurological condition that combines migraines with epileptic seizures is known as migralepsy.

== See also ==
- Migralepsy
