= John P. McGovern =

American physician (1921–2007)

- Born: June 2, 1921; Washington, D.C.
- Died: May 31, 2007 (aged 85); Galveston, Texas
- Known for: Co-founding American Osler Society
- Scientific career
- Fields: Allergy, immunology

John P. McGovern (June 2, 1921 - May 31, 2007) was an American allergist, investor and philanthropist. He established the McGovern Allergy Clinic in Houston, Texas, created the Texas Allergy Research Foundation and the John P. McGovern Foundation, and co-founded the American Osler Society. He is the name sake of the John P. and Katherine G. McGovern Medical School.

== Education ==
He received his B.S. in Medicine from Duke University in 1943 and received his M.D. from the Duke University School of Medicine in 1945.

He did post-graduate training at Yale-New Haven Hospital, McGuire Hospital and at Duke.

At Yale-New Haven Hospital, he was a pediatric intern from July 1945 to June 1946. Then, he served from 1946 to 1948 in the Medical Corps of the United States Army as Captain and as the chief of the paraplegic section.

He was an assistant resident at Duke for 6 months. He then spent the first half of 1949 in a pediatric fellowship at L'Hôpital des Enfants Malades (Paris) and at Guy's Hospital and Great Ormond Street Hospital (both in London). Next, he served as assistant chief, then chief resident for another year and a half at Children's Hospital in Washington, D.C. In 1951, he was a study of pulmonary pathology at Harvard Medical School and Boston Children's Hospital.

== Career ==
After graduating from Duke University School of Medicine, McGovern taught at George Washington University Medical School and Tulane Medical School. He held 17 professorships, received 29 honorary doctorates, and authored over 250 professional publications and books. He was also the President and Chief Elect Officer of 15 professional medical societies.

In 1956, McGovern founded an allergy clinic in Houston known as the McGovern Allergy & Asthma Clinic. As of 2025, the clinic remains operational.

== Philanthropy ==
In 1961, McGovern established the John P. McGovern Foundation as a private philanthropy. Through the Foundation, McGovern gave millions of dollars to various local and health charities. As of 2003, the foundation was the 10th largest in Houston.

A lifelong admirer of Sir William Osler and the principals of compassionate care he espoused, McGovern co-founded the American Osler Society in 1969.

=== Notable contributions ===
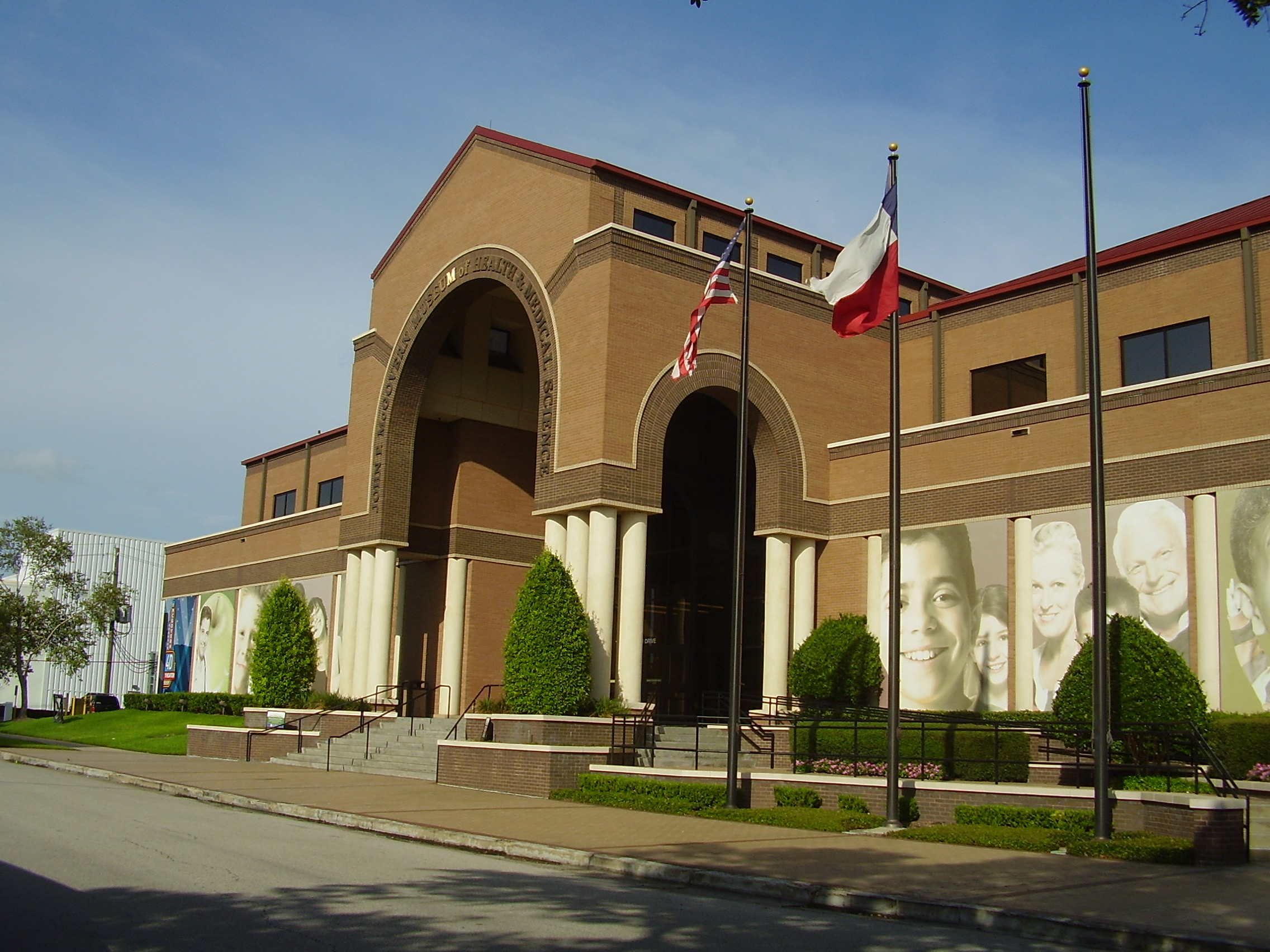
John P. McGovern Museum of Health and Medical Science in Houston, Texas

- In 1998, the foundation gave $6.5M to establish the McGovern-Davison Children’s Health Center at Duke. The center was co-named for McGovern and his mentor, Wilburt Cornell Davison.
- In 2001, McGovern gave $5 million to the University of Texas Medical Branch (UTMB) to create endowments for 5 William Osler Scholars, forming the John P. McGovern Academy of Oslerian Medicine. The endowments award practicing faculty physicians for their commitment to teaching, practicing and emulating the principals of compassionate care.
- In 2003, the Foundation gave $2.5M to UTMB, with $1M provided to create an endowment for a 6th Osler Scholar.
- Various donations to Texas Medical Center for the construction of facilities, a commons area and gardens.
- In November 2015, the Foundation donated $75M to bolster medical training, provide full scholarships, and support scientific discovery and innovation at The University of Texas Health Science Center at Houston. It has been the single largest gift from the John P. McGovern Foundation. In honor of the largest gift in university history, the medical school was renamed the John P. and Kathrine G. McGovern Medical School. The endowment will also support the school's McGovern Center for Humanities and Ethics which was established from an earlier foundation gift.
- In January 2017, the foundation gave $20 million to the University of Houston College of the Arts to create a permanent endowment that will benefit arts students and faculty, as well as community outreach. The Kathrine G. McGovern College of the Arts will be the first college at the university named after a former student and also the first named after a woman.

== Awards ==
McGovern is the recipient of 29 honorary degrees.

McGovern was named as a fellow to various scientific and medical organizations including the American Association of Pediatrics (1952), the American Association of Allergy, Asthma and Immunology (1955, Distinguished Fellow in 1971), American Medical Writers Association (1967), American College of Physicians (1971), the American Association for the Advancement of Science (1972), Royal College of Physicians (honorary, 1984) and the American Society of Addiction Medicine (1998).

In 1976, McGovern was awarded the Distinguished Alumnus Award from Duke University.

=== Other awards ===
- American School Health Association Distinguished Alumnus Award and the William A. Howe Award
- President Reagan Private Sector Initiative Commendation (1985)
- The Harold Swanberg Distinguished Service Award and the Special Award for Meritorious Service from the American Medical Writers Association
- Surgeon General's Medal in 1989 for "lifetime of meritorious and multi-faceted contributions to the broad field of health promotion and disease prevention and specifically, more recently for his seminal work on our Drunk Driving Initiative".
- Distinguished Service Award from the International Council on Alcohol and Addictions (ICAA)
- Royal Order of the Polar Star (Sweden) in 1988
- L'Ordre National du Merite (France) in 1988
- Kemal Atatürk Gold Medal Distinguished Service Award (Turkey) in 1989
- Annual Outstanding Scholarship in Health Care Award from the American Association of Colleges of Nurses in 1990
- Outstanding Alumnus Award from Phi Beta Kappa in 1991
- First Honorary Partner, Points of Light Campaign
- Distinguished Citizen Award from the Rotary Club of Houston in 2001
- Houston Hall of Fame (2003)
- Presidents Award from the Texas Association of Museums (2003)
- First recipient of the Lifetime Achievement Award from the American Lung Association of Texas (2004)

== Honors ==
- John P. McGovern Award in Behavioral Sciences (Lecture) (AAAS).
- John P. McGovern Science and Society Award, Sigma Xi.
- John P. McGovern Centennial Award.
- John P. McGovern Award in Science, Literature, Arts and the Humanities - Cosmos Club (Lecture).
- John P. McGovern Champion of Health Award.
- John P. McGovern Award on Addiction and Society (ASAM).
