= Hemicrania continua =

- Specialty: Neurology

Hemicrania continua (HC) is a persistent unilateral headache that responds to indomethacin. It is usually unremitting, but rare cases of remission have been documented. Hemicrania continua is considered a primary headache disorder, meaning that another condition does not cause it.

== Symptoms and signs ==
In hemicrania continua, basal pain is a dull aching pressure similar to that of TTHs (Tension-Type Headaches) that occurs nearly always on the same side of the head and face. Pain ranges from mild to severe and is characterized by fluctuations that increase in intensity up to three to five times per 24-hour cycle. The range of duration of exacerbations has no boundaries and varies from a few seconds to up to two weeks. While attacks tend to be more frequent at night, no circadian periodicity such as in cluster headache can be observed.

The nature of pain changes during the exacerbation phase, becoming more piercing, throbbing, and intense, generally paired with other highly debilitating symptoms such as nausea, vomiting, dizziness, and sensitivity to light and sounds. During these exacerbation phases, hemicrania continua may mimic other primary and secondary headache disorders, with up to 70% of patients fulfilling the diagnostic criteria for migraine. Physical exertion, changes in sleep patterns, stress, or alcohol consumption can make the headache pain more severe in some patients.In addition to the persistent daily headache of HC, which is usually mild to moderate (and frequently severe), HC can present other symptoms. These additional symptoms of HC can be divided into three main categories:

1. Autonomic symptoms:
  - conjunctival injection
  - tearing
  - rhinorrhea
  - nasal stuffiness
  - eyelid edema
  - forehead sweating
2. Stabbing headaches:
  - Short, "jabbing" headaches superimposed over the persistent daily headache
  - Usually lasting less than one minute
3. Migrainous features:
  - throbbing pain
  - nausea and/or vomiting
  - phonophobia
  - photophobia

== Cause ==
The cause of primary hemicrania continua is unknown. Although one case of familial hemicrania continua has been reported, no genetic susceptibility has been confirmed.

== Diagnosis ==
The following diagnostic criteria are given for hemicrania continua:

1. Headache for more than 3 months fulfilling other 3 criteria:
2. All of the following characteristics:
  - Unilateral pain without side-shift
  - Daily and continuous, without pain-free periods
  - Moderate intensity, but with exacerbations of severe pain
3. At least one of the following autonomic features occurs during exacerbations and ipsilateral to the side of pain:
  - Conjunctival injection and/or lacrimation
  - Nasal congestion and/or rhinorrhea
  - Ptosis and/or miosis
4. Complete response to therapeutic doses of indomethacin, although cases of hemicrania continua that do not resolve with indomethacin treatment have been documented.

A variant on hemicrania continua has also been described, in which the attacks may shift sides, although meeting the above criteria in all other respects.There is no definitive diagnostic test for hemicrania continua. Diagnostic tests such as imaging studies may be ordered to rule out other causes for the headache. When the symptoms of hemicrania continua are present, it's considered "diagnostic" if they respond completely to indomethacin. The efficacy of indomethacin may not be long term for all patients, as can eventually become ineffective.

=== Differential diagnosis ===
The factor that allows hemicrania continua and its exacerbations to be differentiated from migraine and cluster headache is that hemicrania continua is characterized by complete response to therapeutic doses (25–300 mg) of indomethacin. The positive response to this drug is, in fact, a fundamental sine qua non criterion used in differential diagnosis. Triptans and other abortive medications do not affect hemicrania continua.

=== Classification ===
The International Headache Society's International Classification of Headache Disorders classifies hemicrania continua as a primary headache disorder.

== Treatment ==
Hemicrania continua generally responds only to indomethacin 25–300 mg daily, which must be continued long term. Unfortunately, gastrointestinal side effects are a common problem with indomethacin, which may require additional acid-suppression therapy to control.In patients who are unable to tolerate indomethacin, the use of celecoxib 400–800 mg per day (Celebrex) and rofecoxib 50 mg per day (Vioxx - no longer available) have both been shown to be effective and are likely to be associated with fewer GI side effects. There have also been reports of two patients who were successfully managed with topiramate 100–200 mg per day (Topamax) although side effects with this treatment can also prove problematic.

Greater occipital nerve (GON) block comprising 40 mg Depomedrone and 10 mls of 1% Lignocaine injected into the affected nerve is effective, up to a period of approximately three months. Changing the 'cocktail' to include (for example) 10 mls of .5% Marcaine and changing to 2% Lignocaine, whilst in theory should increase the longevity, renders the injection completely ineffective. See 4.2 Posology and method of administration (flocculation).Occipital nerve stimulation may be highly effective when other treatments fail to relieve the intractable pain.

== Epidemiology ==
Hemicrania was mentioned in 1881 in The Therapeutic Gazette Vol. 2, by G.S.Davis, and the incident has been cited in King's American Dispensatory (1898 and later editions) in the description of the strong analgesic Jamaican Dogwood, a relatively low dose of which reportedly produced convulsions and prolonged respiratory depression over six hours in an elderly woman with this condition.

In newer times, Hemicrania continua was described in 1981; at that time around 130 cases were described in the literature. However, rising awareness of the condition has led to increasingly frequent diagnosis in headache clinics, and it seems that it is not as rare as these figures would imply. The condition occurs more often in women than men and tends to present first in adulthood, although it has also been reported in children as young as 5 years old.
