= Harry Lee Parker =

American and Irish neurologist

Harry Lee Parker (1894–1959) was an American and Irish neurologist at the Mayo Clinic. He reported distinct sudden symptoms in people with multiple sclerosis, and authored Clinical Studies in Neurology, published in 1956.
