= GNB3 =

Protein-coding gene in the species Homo sapiens

Identifiers
- Aliases: GNB3, CSNB1H, G protein subunit beta 3, HG2D
- External IDs: OMIM: 139130; MGI: 95785; GeneCards: GNB3

Gene location (Human)
Chr.	Chromosome 12 (human)
Band	12p13.31	Start	6,839,954 bp
Band	12p13.31	End	6,847,393 bp

Gene location (Mouse)
Chr.	Chromosome 6 (mouse)
Band	6 F2|6 59.17 cM	Start	124,811,203 bp
Band	6 F2|6 59.17 cM	End	124,817,238 bp
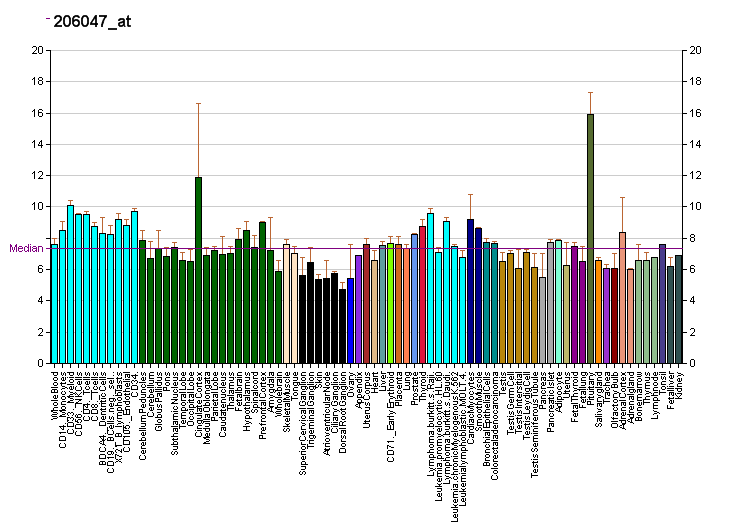
RNA expression pattern
Bgee	Human / Mouse (ortholog); Top expressed in: anterior pituitary; right hemisphere of cerebellum; apex of heart; right frontal lobe; right ovary; retinal pigment epithelium; right coronary artery; body of uterus; left ovary; Descending thoracic aorta / Top expressed in: neural layer of retina; pineal gland; pituitary gland; retinal pigment epithelium; lens; superior cervical ganglion; embryo; embryo; morula; epithelium of lens; More reference expression data
BioGPS	More reference expression data
Gene ontology
Molecular function	GTPase binding; spectrin binding; protein binding; signal transducer activity; GTPase activity
Cellular component	cell body; neuron projection; plasma membrane; dendrite; extracellular exosome; cytosol
Biological process	regulation of blood pressure; G protein-coupled receptor signaling pathway; cellular response to glucagon stimulus; signal transduction; protein folding; cell volume homeostasis; regulation of gene expression; regulation of glucose metabolic process; regulation of hormone metabolic process; regulation of fat cell differentiation; regulation of feeding behavior; regulation of cholesterol metabolic process; regulation of triglyceride metabolic process; regulation of locomotion involved in locomotory behavior; regulation of phospholipid metabolic process
Sources:Amigo / QuickGO
Orthologs
Databases	NCBI: entry; OMA: entry
Species	Human	Mouse
Entrez	2784	14695
Ensembl	ENSG00000111664	ENSMUSG00000023439
UniProt	P16520	Q61011
RefSeq (mRNA)	NM_001297571; NM_002075	NM_013530
RefSeq (protein)	NP_001284500; NP_002066	NP_038558
Location (UCSC)	Chr 12: 6.84 – 6.85 Mb	Chr 6: 124.81 – 124.82 Mb
PubMed search
- Wikidata
View/Edit Human	View/Edit Mouse

Guanine nucleotide-binding protein G(I)/G(S)/G(T) subunit beta-3 is a protein that in humans is encoded by the GNB3 gene.

Heterotrimeric guanine nucleotide-binding proteins ( G proteins), which integrate signals between receptors and effector proteins, are composed of an alpha, a beta, and a gamma subunit. These subunits are encoded by families of related genes. This gene encodes a beta subunit. Beta subunits are important regulators of alpha subunits, as well as of certain signal transduction receptors and effectors. A single-nucleotide polymorphism (C825T) in this gene is associated with essential hypertension and obesity. This polymorphism is also associated with the occurrence of the splice variant GNB3-s, which appears to have increased activity. GNB3-s is an example of alternative splicing caused by a nucleotide change outside of the splice donor and acceptor sites. Additional splice variants may exist for this gene, but they have not been fully described.
