= American Osler Society =

- Formation: 1970
- Purpose: "the common purpose of keeping alive the memory of Sir William Osler"
- President: C. Joan Richardson
- Affiliations: Osler Library of the History of Medicine
- Website: Official website

The American Osler Society is an organisation dedicated to the history of medicine and focuses on the "life, teachings, and ethical example of Sir William Osler". It works in co-operation with the Osler Library of the History of Medicine at McGill University and consists of a group of physicians, medical historians, and other related professions united by "the common purpose of keeping alive the memory of Sir William Osler".

The society publishes a newsletter, The Oslerian.

== Origins ==
John P. McGovern, from Houston, Texas, and Alfred Henderson from Washington, were concerned over the perceived lessening humane effect of science on medical education and the increasing threat of technology. Together with Chester R. Burns they formed the American Osler Society in 1970. William B. Bean became the first president, George Harrell the first vice-president, followed by Tom Durant as second vice-president. McGovern became the first secretary and the position of "historian" was created in 2000.

The statement of purpose;

The purpose of the Society is to unite, into an organized group, physicians, and others allied to the profession, with a common interest in memorializing and perpetuating the lessons of the life and teachings of William Osler; to meet periodically for the purpose of presentation and discussion ofpapers on the life and influence of Osler upon the profession, and to publish these essays as a Proceedings of the Society; to continually place before the profession a reminder of the high principles of life and humanism in practice of Osler, and to introduce these things to those entering the profession.

Osler's Oxford students, Wilburt C. Davison, Emile Holman, and Wilder Penfield, were named the three Honorary Members.

== Logo ==
A latchkey represents the logo of the society. A number of junior medical staff were given the keys to Osler's home library in Baltimore, by Osler himself. These favoured staff members who included Harvey Cushing, became known as "latch-keyers".

== Activities ==
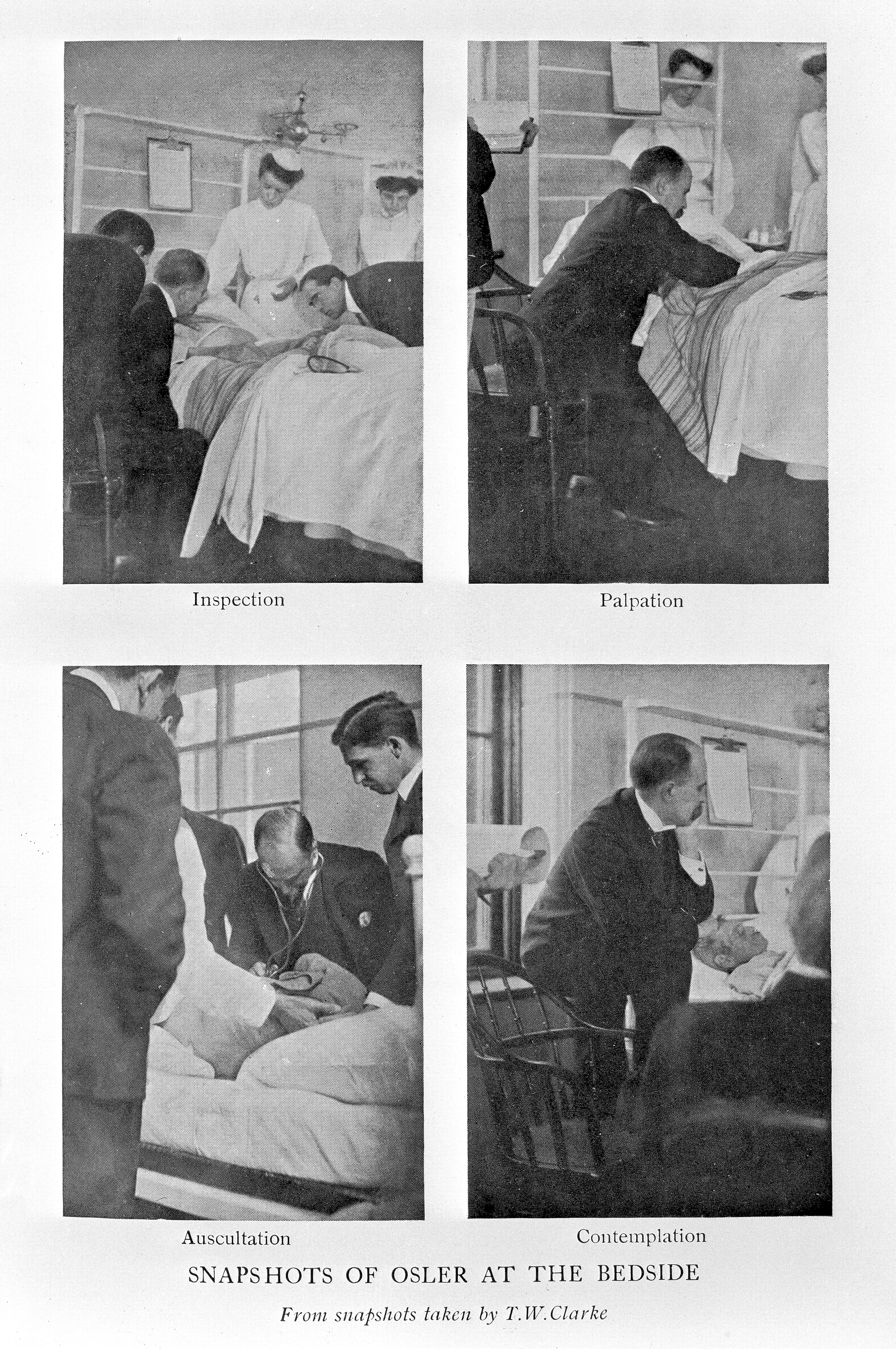
William Osler at bedside of patients. Wellcome

The society works in co-operation with the Osler Library of the History of Medicine at McGill University and consists of a group of physicians, medical historians, and other related professions united by the aim of keeping Osler's memory. The society meets annually each spring.

Between 1970 and 2007, the society had witnessed over 700 presentations, of which about half have been centred around Osler's personal and professional life.

In May 2003, the American Osler Society, the Osler Club of London and the Japanese Osler Society came together in Edinburgh.

== Publications ==
Selected presentations have been published as the persisting Osler in the quarterly The Oslerian.

== Awards ==
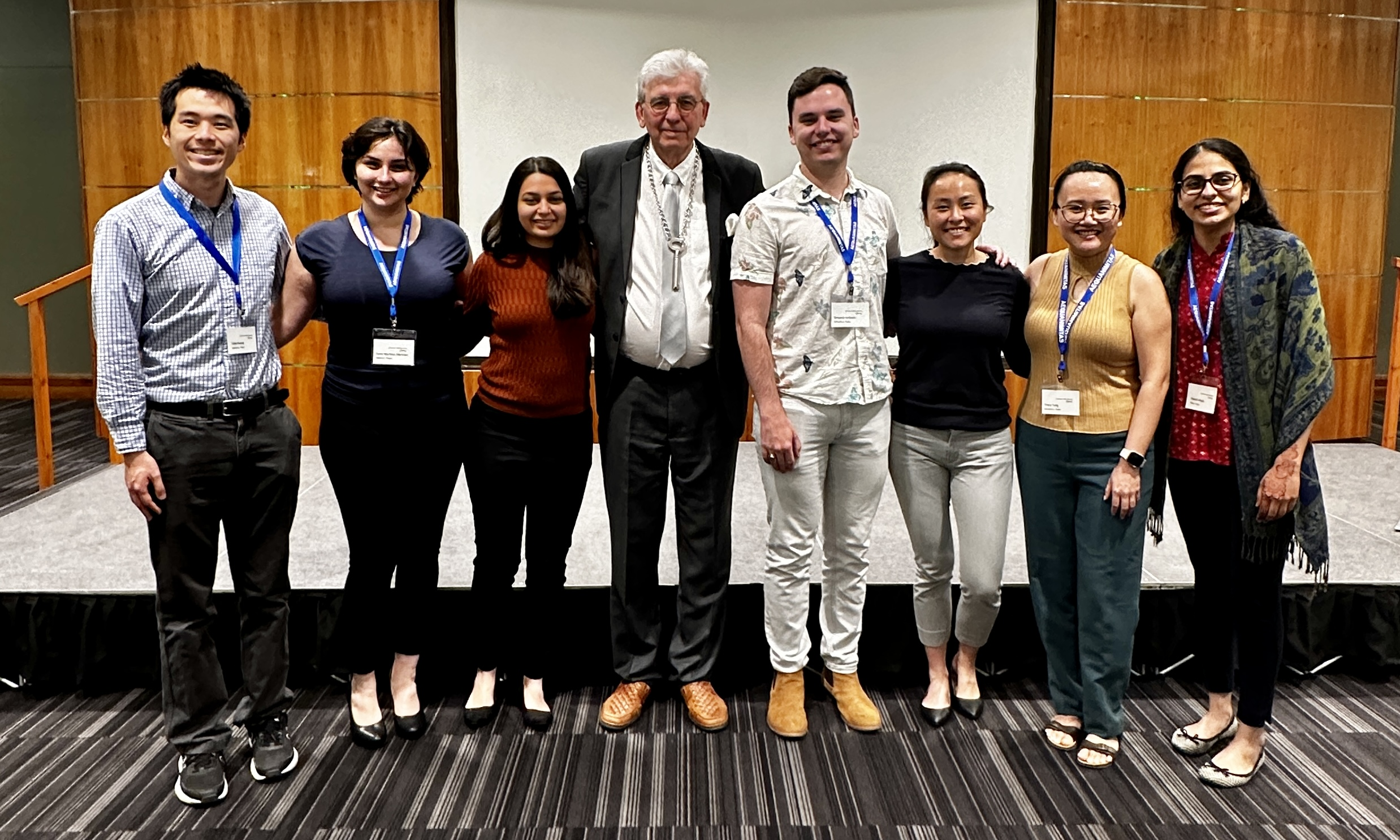
Medical students and Rolando Del Maestro at the American Osler Society

The William Osler Academy Awards was initiated by the co-operation of the Osler Library of the History of Medicine at McGill and the American Osler Society.

=== Bean prize ===
The society supports the student "Bean prize" for research in medical history.

=== John P. McGovern Award Lecture ===
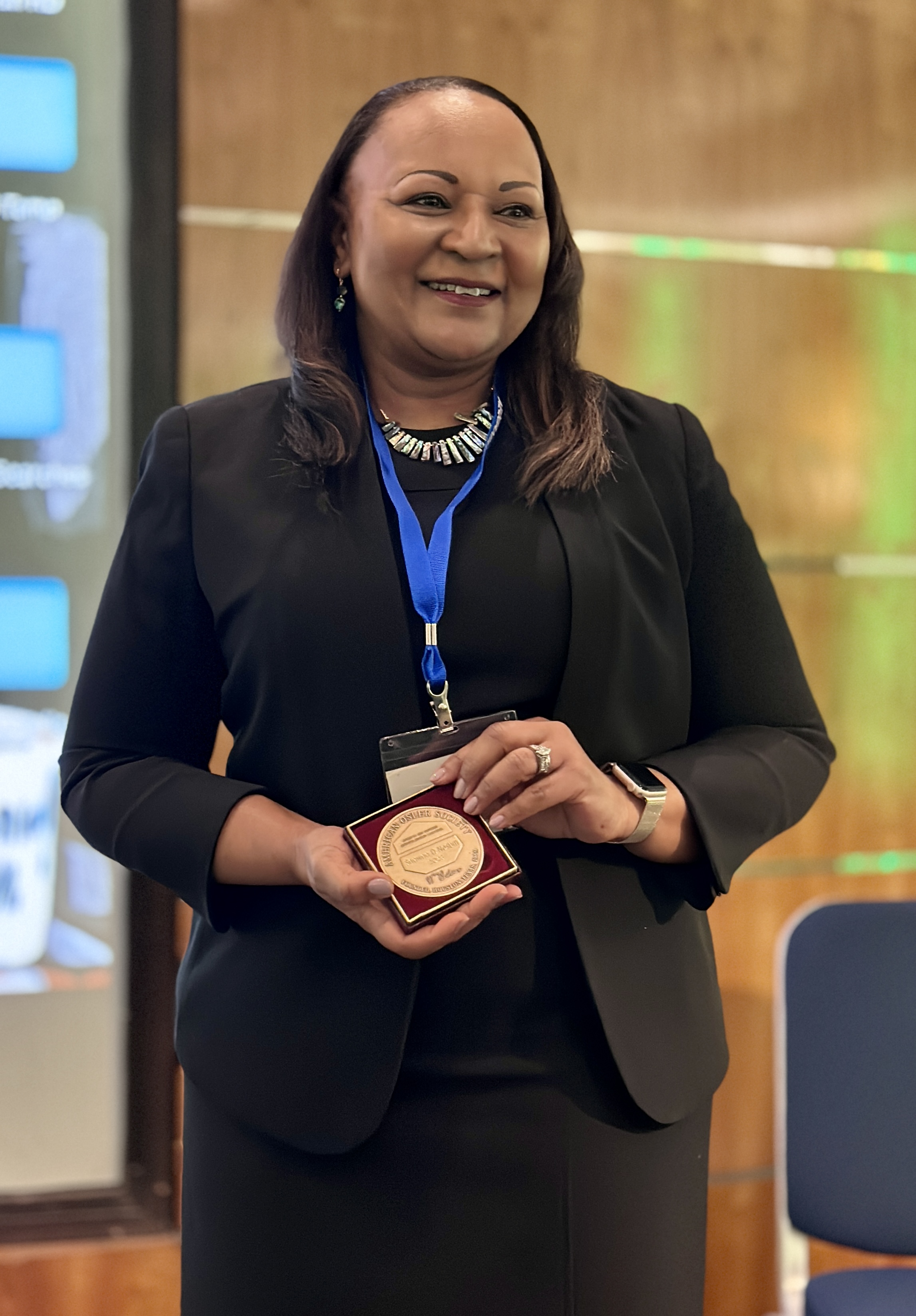
Shawna Nesbitt, recipient of John P. McGovern Award Lecture 2023

The John P. McGovern Award Lecture was created by the AOS in 1983.

== Selected publications ==
- "The Persisting Osler II: Selected Transactions of the American Osler Society 1981-1990", 27 September 1995, Gerald Tremblay, Journal of the American Medical Association, pp. 274(12):990-991, doi:10.1001/jama.1995.03530120084050
- "Review: The Persisting Osler III: Selected Transactions of the American Osler Society, 1991–2000", S. Ryan Gregory,Journal of the History of Medicine and Allied Sciences, Volume 59, Issue 1, January 2004, pp. 156–158, doi:10.1093/jhmas/jrg049

== See also ==
- List of presidents of the American Osler Society
