= Hypnic headache =

- Specialty: Neurology
- Duration: 2 days - 1 week
- Frequency: 20%
- Deaths: 3K

Hypnic headaches are benign primary headaches that affect the elderly, with an average age of onset at 63 ± 11 years. They are moderate, throbbing, bilateral or unilateral headaches that wake the sufferer from sleep once or multiple times a night. They typically begin a few hours after sleep begins and can last from 15–180 min. There is normally no nausea, photophobia, phonophobia or autonomic symptoms associated with the headache. They commonly occur at the same time every night possibly linking the headaches with circadian rhythm, but polysomnography has recently revealed that the onset of hypnic headaches may be associated with REM sleep.

== Diagnosis ==
For diagnosis of hypnic headache syndrome, headaches should occur at least 15 times per month for at least one month. Included in the differential diagnosis of a new onset nighttime headaches in the elderly is drug withdrawal, temporal arteritis, Sleep apnea, oxygen desaturation, pheochromocytoma, intracranial causes, primary and secondary neoplasms, communicating hydrocephalus, subdural hematoma, vascular lesions, migraines, cluster headaches, chronic paroxysmal hemicrania, headaches due to bruxism, and hypnic headache. All other causes must be ruled out before the diagnosis of hypnic headache can be made.

== Treatments ==
Lithium carbonate 200–600 mg at bedtime is an effective treatment for most patients but for those that can not tolerate lithium, Verapamil, indomethacin, melatonin or methysergide may be tried. Two patients have also responded to flunarizine 5 mg. It has also been shown that 1–2 cups of coffee or 100–200 mg of caffeine before bed can prevent hypnic headaches.

A recent review of 348 cases available in the literature has been recently published.
