= Migralepsy =

- Specialty: Neurology

Migralepsy is a rare condition in which a migraine is followed, within an hour period, by an epileptic seizure. Because of the similarities in signs, symptoms, and treatments of both conditions, such as the neurological basis, the psychological issues, and the autonomic distress that is created from them, they individually increase the likelihood of causing the other. However, also because of the sameness, they are often misdiagnosed for each other, as migralepsy rarely occurs.

== Signs and symptoms ==
General symptoms of migralepsy are:

- Flashes of light
- Geometric or animate forms
- Visual hallucinations
- Vomiting
- Headache
- Blindness
- Loss of consciousness
- Convulsions

== Cause ==
The connection between migraines and epileptic seizures is currently being researched and not much is known. Patients have been shown to have had migraines long before developing epileptic symptoms, creating the possibility of severe cases of migraines creating epilepsy. However, not every migraine may be accompanied by a seizure and sometimes the seizures happen without any migraine involvement. Due to this, finding the origin of migralepsy is difficult and enveloped somewhere in the overlap between both conditions. Some patients have shown that their relatives had migraines as well and even some from migralepsy, forming the possibility that migralepsy is genetic in origin and forms only rarely as both, generally resulting in only one condition or the other.

== Diagnosis ==
Because epileptic seizures may occur with a side effect that resembles migraine aura, it is complicated to diagnose whether a patient is having a normal epileptic episode or if it is a true migraine that is then being followed by a seizure, which would be a true sign of migralepsy. Many neurological symptoms can only be expressed by the patient, who can confuse different feelings, especially when the symptoms of a migraine are extremely similar to that of a seizure. Thus, many physicians are reluctant to consider migralepsy to be a true condition, considering its rarity, and those that do believe in it are prone to over-diagnose it, leading to more problems in terms of finding the truth of the condition.

However, it has been found that EEG scans have been able to differentiate between migraine auras and auras related to epilepsy. It has generally been seen that EEG scans are not as helpful in determining facets of migraines as they are with epilepsy. Though they are able to work in determining the starting and ending points of migraines and the overlap of epileptic episodes during or after them, even if the scans are still lacking in considerable necessary data and confusing results. EEG scans have been able to observe seizures that occur in between the aura and headache phase of migraines and such occurrences have been termed intercalated seizures.

== Treatment ==
Since migralepsy is, for all intents and purposes, a combination of migraines and epilepsy, the medication for the conditions supplied individually can be combined jointly in order to lessen the effects of both. It is also helpful that many antiepileptic drugs also work as antimigraines, lessening the number of medications that must be taken. Thus, while neither can be cured, they can be treated so that they occur less frequently and allow a patient to live a relatively normal life.
