= Tearing =

Tearing may refer to:

- Tearing (physics), when material breaks apart by force
- Tearing (medicine), also known as epiphora, an overflow of tears onto the face
- Screen tearing, a form of visual artifact in video displays
- "Tearing" (song)

== See also ==
- Tear (disambiguation)
