= Bayard Taylor Horton =

American physician

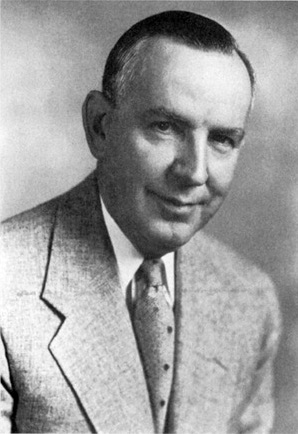
Bayard Taylor Horton

Bayard Taylor Horton (1895–1980) was an American physician who did research on headache and gave the first description of the histopathological features of temporal arteritis.
