= Wilfred Harris =

Wilfred Harris (2 December 1869-28 February 1960), was a British neurologist who wrote several books on diseases of the nervous system, including Electrical treatment (1908).
