= William Bennett Bean =

American physician

- Born: 8 November 1909; Philippine Islands
- Died: 1 March 1989 (aged 79)
- Education: University of Virginia

William Bennett Bean (November 8, 1909 – March 1, 1989) was an internist, medical historian, teacher and collector.

He coined the term venous lake.

== Early life and education ==
William Bennett Bean was born in 1909 in the Philippines, to Robert Bennett Bean, a physician who had once been resident under Sir William Osler. He graduated M.D. from the University of Virginia in 1935.

The family had previously moved to New Orleans and a few years later to Charlottesville, Virginia, where his father became chairman of the Department of Anatomy at the University of Virginia. He received his B.A. and M.D. from the University of Virginia, in 1932 and 1935, respectively. Following graduation from medical school, with top of the class designation and as president of Alpha Omega Alpha, he interned on the Osler Service at Johns Hopkins University. The following year he moved to Boston and joined the elite group at the Thorndike Laboratory and the Harvard Service at Boston City Hospital. Bean began his clinical career at the University of Cincinnati College of Medicine (1936–1946) and at Cincinnati General Hospital (1941–1948). He was both a teacher and clinician, specializing in nutrition. He left Ohio in 1948 to become professor of medicine and head of internal medicine at the University of Iowa College of Medicine. He was named Sir William Osler Professor of Medicine there in 1970. In 1974, Dr. Bean was appointed Director, Institute for Medical Humanities and Professor of Internal Medicine at the University of Texas Medical Branch, Galveston. In 1980, he retired from the Institute and returned to Iowa City as Sir William Osler Professor Emeritus.

== Research ==
Bean began researching heat acclimatisation during World War II, when he collected data on the amount of heat troops could withstand in tanks. He also conducted nutrition research, including studies on inducing vitamin deficits in people, and helping develop more palatable C-rations to replace the K-rations that soldiers refused to eat (and which caused nutritional deficiencies). Bean notes, "The most spectacular results we saw were in the 38th Infantry Division in Luzon, who had been fighting the Japanese for four and a half months, subsisting on the improved C-ration. The soldiers, though low on praise, were still eating the food."

In 1941, Bean began a medical self-experiment when he was unable to find information about the speed of growth of human nails or the factors that influenced it, such as being ill; he would regularly mark his thumbnail with a sharp glass, and record the time & distance the scratches traveled before disappearing. He published updates at 5–10 year intervals for 40 years until 1980.

== Awards and honours ==
Throughout his career, Bean was well known for his expertise in the field of nutrition, but even more so for his teaching and writing excellence. Long an admirer and follower of Sir William Osler's philosophies and techniques, Bean rarely turned down an invitation to speak or be a visiting professor. In his 1974 Archives of Internal Medicine festschrift, he was described as:"a true renaissance man: an articulate clinician, a scholar of the classics, a masterful teller of tales, and a prodigious writer of stories."

Awarded Fellowship, American Medical Writers Association in 1958 (Fellowships presented to members of AMWA to recognize significant contributions to the goals and activities of AMWA and professional accomplishments that have been recognized by their peers.)

Awarded Swanberg Distinguished Service Award, American Medical Writers Association in 1969. (Swanberg Award presented to any active member of AMWA who has made distinguished contributions to medical communication or rendered unusual and distinguished services to the medical profession.)

Between 1937 and 1974, Bean published over 600 works in such diverse fields as nutrition, respiratory disease, myocardial infarction, climatology, arterial "spiders," slum eradication and housing, liver disease, William Osler, Walter Reed, and the history of medicine. For over thirty years, Bean served as editor for fifteen journals, most notably the Archives of Internal Medicine. In 1970, he co-founded the American Osler Society. He also was selected by two different Presidents to serve on the National Library of Medicine's Board of Regents. His papers are held at the Osler Library of the History of Medicine at McGill University.

In 2025, Bean was posthumously awarded the Ig Nobel Prize in Literature, for the studies he published on his research on the growth of human nails.

== Selected works ==
- Bean, William B., Walter Reed: A Biography, Charlottesville: University Press of Virginia, 1982.
- Bean, William B., “Walter Reed and Yellow Fever,” JAMA 250.5 (5 August 1983): 659-62.
