= Mary Louise Marshall =

American librarian and educator (1893–1986)

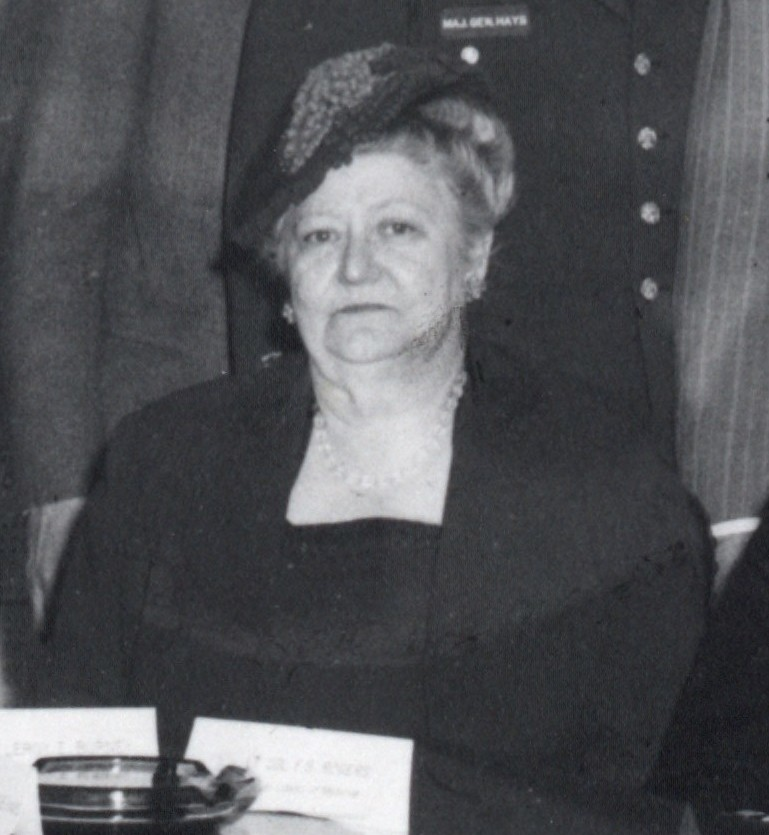
- Portrait of Marshall in 1957
- Born: July 19, 1893; Salem, Illinois, U.S.
- Died: January 25, 1986 (aged 92); New Orleans, Louisiana, U.S.
- Education: University of Wisconsin, Madison
- Occupations: Librarian and Professor of Medical Bibliography
- Employer: Tulane University Medical School
- Known for: Medical Librarianship
- Title: Medical Library Association President
- Term: 1941–1946
- Spouse: John Henry Hutton

Mary Louise Marshall (1893–1986) was Librarian and Professor of Medical Bibliography at Tulane University School of Medicine, and the longest-running president of the Medical Library Association (1941–46).

== Early life and education ==
Mary Louise Marshall was born on July 19, 1893, in Salem, Illinois. The oldest of three children, she studied at the Illinois Women's College and Southern Illinois Normal University before completing her studies at the University of Wisconsin's Library School in 1914; the university did not grant library degrees at the time. Marshall completed an internship at a public library where she earned $50 a month in wages and lived in the home of a faculty member.

== Career ==
Around the time of World War I, Marshall worked at the library of Southern Illinois Normal University. In 1919, she left Illinois for New Orleans, LA where she became employed at the American Library Association's (ALA) War Library "scheme for soldiers not yet discharged from the armed forces." When the New Orlean's ALA office closed, she took the position of librarian at the Rudolph Matas-Orleans Parish Medical Society Library, which later consolidated into Tulane University's Medical Library. She held a dual role as Professor of Medical Bibliography.

Marshall worked closely with fellow librarians Eileen Cunningham and Janet Doe on various projects. One project being the Handbook of Medical Library Practice, where Marshall authored a chapter on classification schemes. When the Army Medical Library, now the U.S. National Library of Medicine (NLM) needed a chairperson to lead a committee of librarians, medical scientists, and physicians to produce a classification scheme, which would later evolve into the National Library of Medicine classification, a library indexing system covering the fields of medicine and preclinical basic sciences.

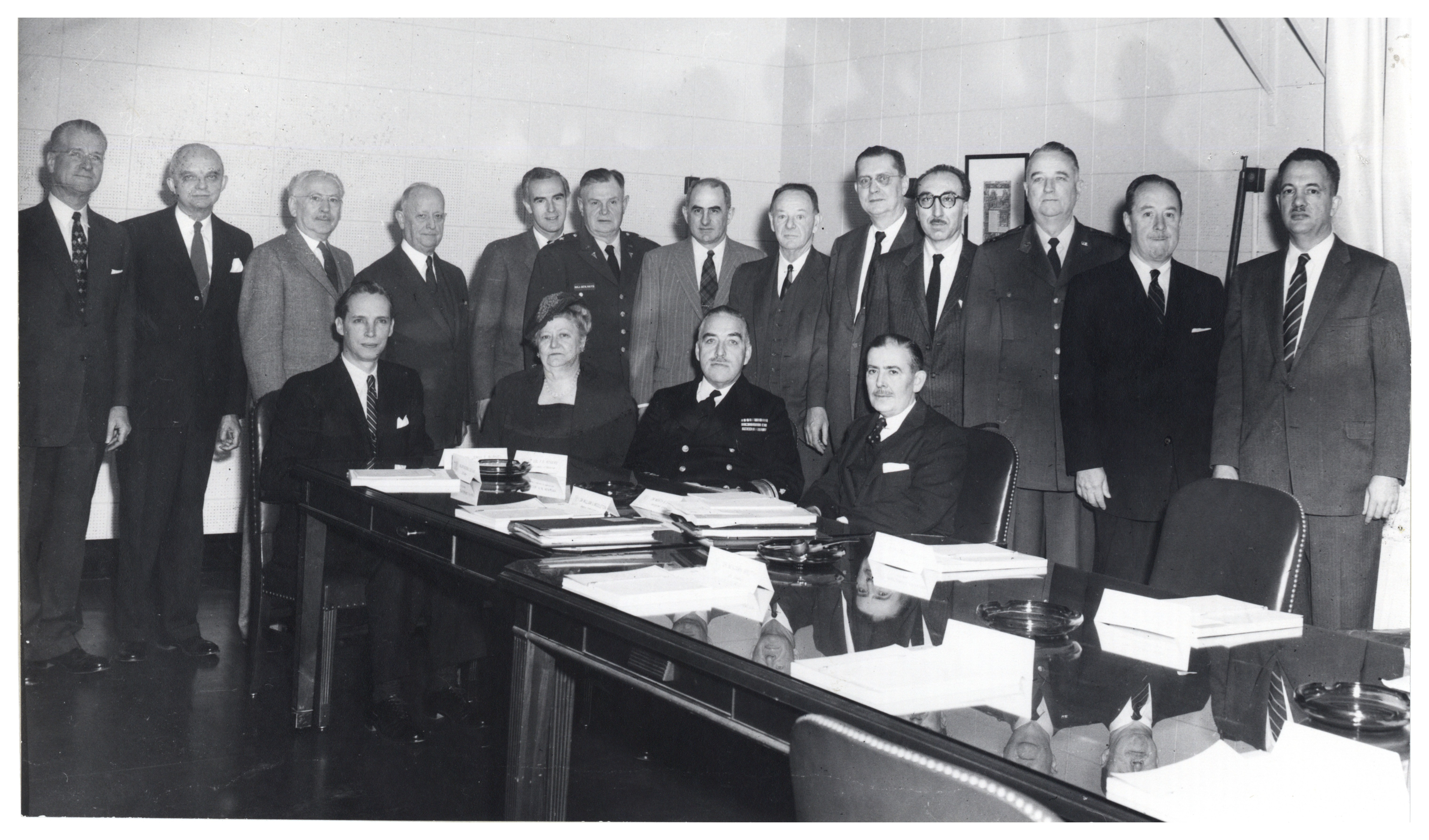
Frank B. Rogers and the NLM Board of Regents

When the NLM formed their first Board of Regents, Marshall was invited by Dr. Frank B. Rogers, then Director of the NLM, to serve as the only woman and the only medical librarian.

Mere days after retiring from Tulane University's Medical Library in 1959, Marshall began working closely with medical school libraries in Colombia, South America as a consultant with the International Congresses on Medical Librarianship.

== Medical Library Association ==
During her years as librarian, Marshall became an active member of the Medical Library Association. She served as membership committee chair from 1927 to 1929, treasurer from 1930 to 1937, and in 1941, was the second woman elected as president. Due to World War II, annual MLA meetings were put on hold, and Marshall became the longest running MLA President, serving until 1946.

Marshall received the Marcia C. Noyes Award in 1953, the MLA's most distinguished award.

== Personal life ==
While living in New Orleans, Marshall met and married Mr. John Henry "Jack" Hutton. In addition to her interest in medical librarianship, she was also interested in the history of medicine and wrote several books on the topic: Medicine in the Confederacy, Plantation Medicine, Versatile Genius of Daniel Drake, Nurse Heroines of the Confederacy. She was also interested in genealogy and was actively involved with the Colonial Dames, serving as their national librarian, historian, and chairwoman of research.
