= Janet Doe =

American librarian

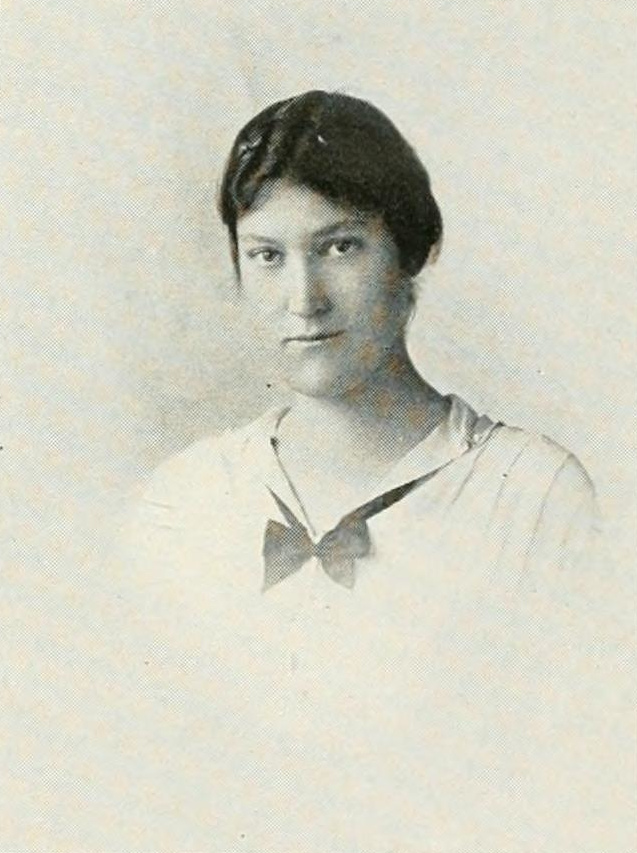
- Born: 11 April 1895
- Died: 17 November 1985 (aged 90)

Janet Doe (April 11, 1895 in Newbury, Vermont – November 17, 1985 in Somers, New York) was a medical librarian notable for her work at the New York Academy of Medicine and her consultant work with the Army Medical Library.

Janet Doe began her library career at the New York Public Library. She entered medical librarianship in 1923 as an assistant librarian at Rockefeller Institute for Medical Research. From 1949 to 1956, Doe served as the first female library director at the New York Academy of Medicine. In 1956, Doe spoke before the United States Congress on behalf of the Medical Library Association advocating for the designation of a National Library of Medicine and its transition from the Armed Forces Medical Library administered under the Department of Defense.

Doe served as president of the Medical Library Association from 1948 to 1949. Her 1949 presidential address, entitled The Development of Education For Medical Librarianship, was republished in a 2012 issue of the Journal of the Medical Library Association. Through a guest editorial in 1950, Doe announced the sanctioning of regional chapter meetings for the Medical Library Association, a tradition which continues today. Her memory is preserved in the annual Janet Doe Lectureship series, established in 1965. She gave her oral history to Estelle Brodman in 1977.
