= Estelle Brodman =

American medical librarian and historian

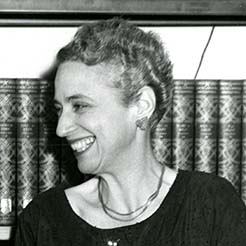
- Born: June 1, 1914; New York City
- Died: March 1, 2007 (aged 92); Hightstown, New Jersey
- Education: Columbia University (Ph.D.)
- Occupation(s): Medical librarian, academic
- Known for: Advancing automation in libraries
- Medical career
- Institutions: National Library of Medicine; Washington University School of Medicine

Estelle Brodman (1914–2007) was an American medical librarian and medical historian. She held positions at Columbia University, the National Library of Medicine and the Washington University School of Medicine (WashU Medicine). Brodman served terms as director of the Special Libraries Association, president of the Medical Library Association, and editor of the Bulletin of the Medical Library Association. Under Brodman's leadership, the library at WashU Medicine became known as a leader in the use of computing machines to perform library functions.

== Early life ==
Brodman was born in New York City on June 1, 1914. Her father, Henry Brodman, was a physician. Her mother was Nettie Sameth Brodman. She had one brother, Keeve, who became a psychiatrist. She described them as growing up in a "culture of Talmudic scholars" and said that there was an emphasis on intellectual pursuits in her family that influenced her for the rest of her career. Brodman said that she could not relate to those who did not enjoy learning new things.

Earning an undergraduate degree in histology and embryology from Cornell University, Brodman was hoping to go to medical school, but she was not accepted. She recalled with embarrassment that she had entered a library career almost inadvertently while having a quarrel with her mother. When her mother suggested becoming a social worker instead of a physician, Brodman snapped back sarcastically that she would rather become a librarian than a social worker. "Since she was paying for it, that's what I became," Brodman explained.

After earning a bachelor's degree in library science from Columbia University in 1936, Brodman began her career at the Columbia medical library while pursuing a master's degree in library science. When Brodman was told that she could never become the head librarian at Columbia because she was a woman, she decided to begin work on a Ph.D. in the history of medicine at Columbia.

== Career ==
Brodman taught courses in library science at Columbia and a nursing history course for nursing students at Columbia-Presbyterian Hospital. When one of Brodman's library science students, Frank Bradway Rogers, became the head of the Army Medical Library (later known as the National Library of Medicine), he asked Brodman to take a position there as an assistant reference librarian. Near the end of her time at the NLM, she worked to formulate the Medical Library Assistance Act, though it did not become legislation until several years after Brodman left the NLM.

At WashU Medicine, Brodman became increasingly involved in using computers to increase automation of library functions. While computers were beginning to play a role in other university matters, there were not enough information technology staff members to meet the library's goals, so Brodman had the library staff trained in some IT functions. As the university's library utilized more technology, it began to host annual conferences on the use of computers for librarians.

After twelve years at the NLM, Brodman left to become Associate Professor of Medical History at the Washington University School of Medicine (WashU Medicine) in 1961. She had completed her Ph.D. in 1954. Brodman was promoted to full professor by 1964.

Based on her doctoral dissertation, Brodman wrote a book, The Development of Medical Bibliography, which became a standard reference in medical librarianship. She also authored several biographical papers on historical figures in medicine and she advocated for the development and expansion of the MLA's oral history project. Brodman traveled abroad as a consultant and lecturer; she taught librarianship at Japan's Keio University and took a trip sponsored by the World Health Organization to evaluate family planning practices in India. She retired from WashU Medicine in 1981.

Much of Brodman's published writing was inspired by manuscripts given to WashU Medicine. The William Beaumont Papers, a collection donated to WashU Medicine in 1915 by the granddaughter of army surgeon William Beaumont, spurred Brodman to write three papers on Beaumont and his work. The first, which discussed the relationship between Beaumont and Joseph Lovell, was published in the Bulletin of the History of Medicine. "William Beaumont as a physician" followed three years later in the Wisconsin Medical Journal, and "William Beaumont and the transfer of biomedical information" was published in Federation Proceedings in 1985 as part of a special series celebrating the 200th anniversary of Beaumont's birth.

== Service ==
Brodman served on several commissions and boards. From 1949 to 1952, Brodman was director of the Special Libraries Association (SLA); before that, she had chaired the association's Biological Sciences Group. In 1966, President Lyndon B. Johnson established the National Advisory Commission on Libraries (NACL) to assess the role of libraries in the United States; he appointed Brodman to the group. The NACL recommended the establishment of the National Commission on Libraries and Information Science. She served on the executive council of the American Association for the History of Medicine and chaired the Biomedical Communication Study Section of the National Institutes of Health. She also served extensively with the Medical Library Association (MLA); she was the editor of the Bulletin of the Medical Library Association, the predecessor to the Journal of the Medical Library Association, from 1947 to 1957. She was president of the MLA in 1964-65.

== Honors and awards ==
In 1971, the MLA honored Brodman with the Marcia C. Noyes Award, which "recognizes a career that has resulted in lasting, outstanding contributions to medical librarianship". Brodman received the MLA's Gottlieb Award (now known as the Erich Meyerhoff Prize) in 1977 in recognition of the best unpublished paper related to the history of medicine. She was awarded an honorary doctorate from the University of Illinois. In 1981, she received the SLA's John Cotton Dana Award.

== Later life ==
By 1985, Brodman lived in a retirement village in Hightstown, New Jersey. In 1986, the MLA created the Estelle Brodman Award to honor outstanding mid-career academic medical librarians. Brodman died of natural causes in New Jersey in 2007.
