= Margaret Ridley Charlton =

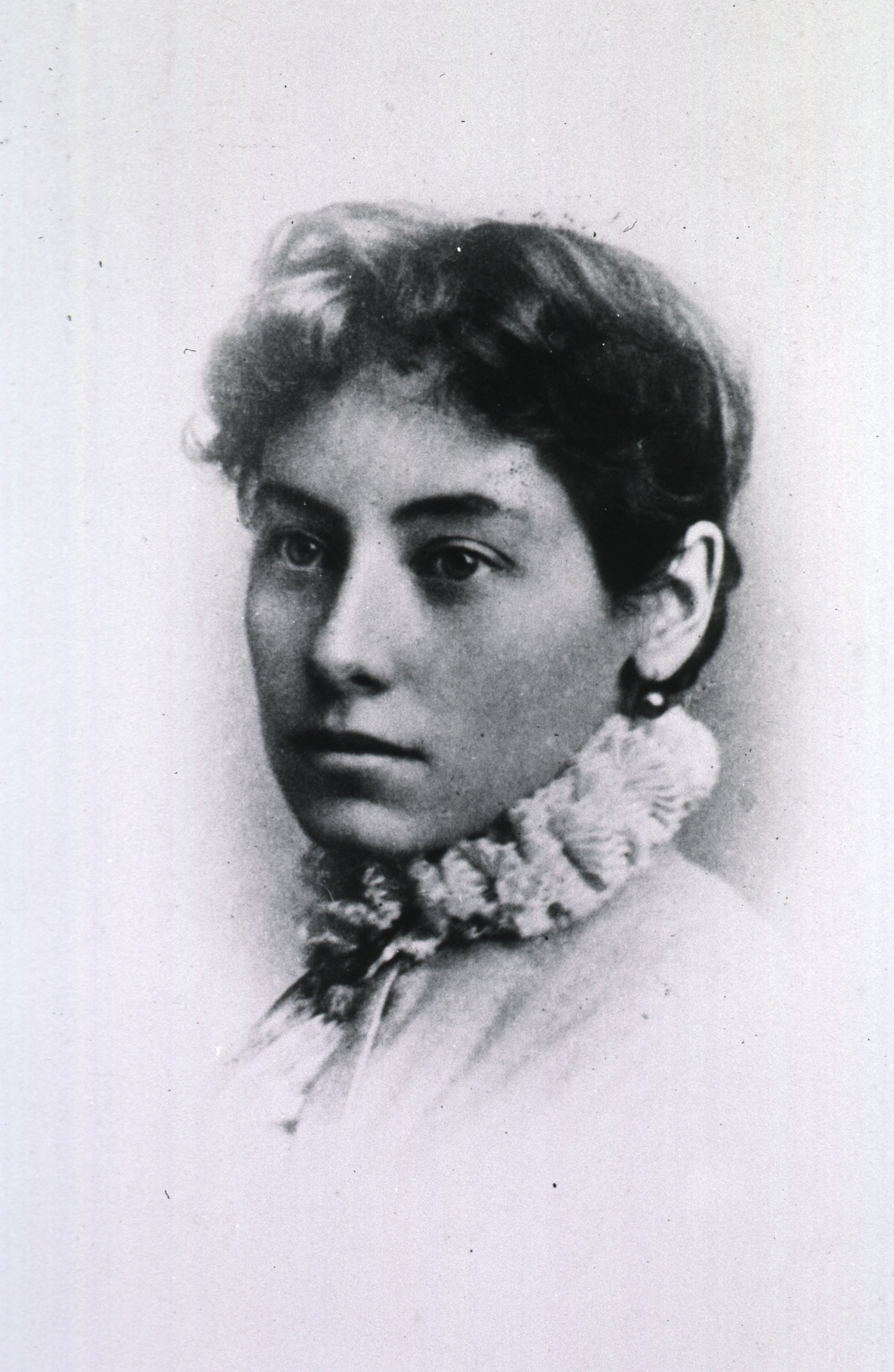
- Born: Margaret Anne Charlton; December 10, 1858; La Prairie, Quebec, Canada
- Died: May 1, 1931 (aged 72); Montreal, Quebec, Canada
- Occupation: librarian

Margaret Ridley Charlton (December 10, 1858 – May 1, 1931) was a Canadian medical librarian, scholar, and author who was a founding member of the Medical Library Association. As Assistant Librarian of the McGill Medical Library from 1895 to 1914 and Librarian of the Academy of Medicine in Toronto from 1914 to 1922, she played a key role in modernizing medical libraries and establishing librarianship as an autonomous profession. In 1898, she co-founded the Association of Medical Librarians, which became the Medical Library Association in 1907, paving the way for the field of medical librarianship and other specialized library associations. Charlton was also a scholar and author, writing for historical sketches, book reviews, as well as authoring children's books.

== Early life ==
Margaret Ridley Charlton was born on December 10, 1858, in La Prairie, Quebec, a small town on the south shore of the St. Lawrence River near Montreal. She was christened Margaret Anne but later changed her middle name to Ridley, to honor her descent from the family of the martyred Bishop Nicholas Ridley, an Anglican martyr burned at the stake in Oxford in 1555.

Charlton was well educated by the standards of late Victorian Canada. Like most young women at the time, Charlton was educated at home until she was sixteen, when she joined the first group of girls admitted to Montreal High School, having attended the school between 1874 and 1877. By the time Anglophone women were allowed to attend McGill University, Charlton was already twenty-six, so she did not pursue a university degree. However, Charlton completed a summer course on librarianship at Amherst College, where Melvin Dewey taught.

== Career ==
As was becoming common during the late Victorian period in Canada, educated middle-class women were entering the labor force, particularly in professions such as teaching, nursing, and librarianship. During this time, a public library movement was also emerging; after a government grant in 1857 establishing lending libraries in Canada, the Free Libraries' Act was passed in 1882, further expanding opportunities for women to become librarians. Charlton's first job was as a librarian at the YMCA Library from 1888 to 1894. She entered the field of medical librarianship while in its infancy, when no formal training programs or professional standards existed, as the first course dedicated to medical librarianship would not be offered until 1939 at Columbia University which focused on medical reference and bibliography. Even still, out of the four librarians who were charter members of the Medical Library Association, only Charlton had any formal study in librarianship with the summer course she took at Amherst College. Although women generally held subordinate roles in libraries at the time, often being relegated to assistant positions and rarely leadership roles, Charlton distinguished herself by advancing into medical librarianship and taking on responsibilities rarely entrusted to women. In 1895, she took on the role of Assistant Medical Librarian at McGill University Medical Library.

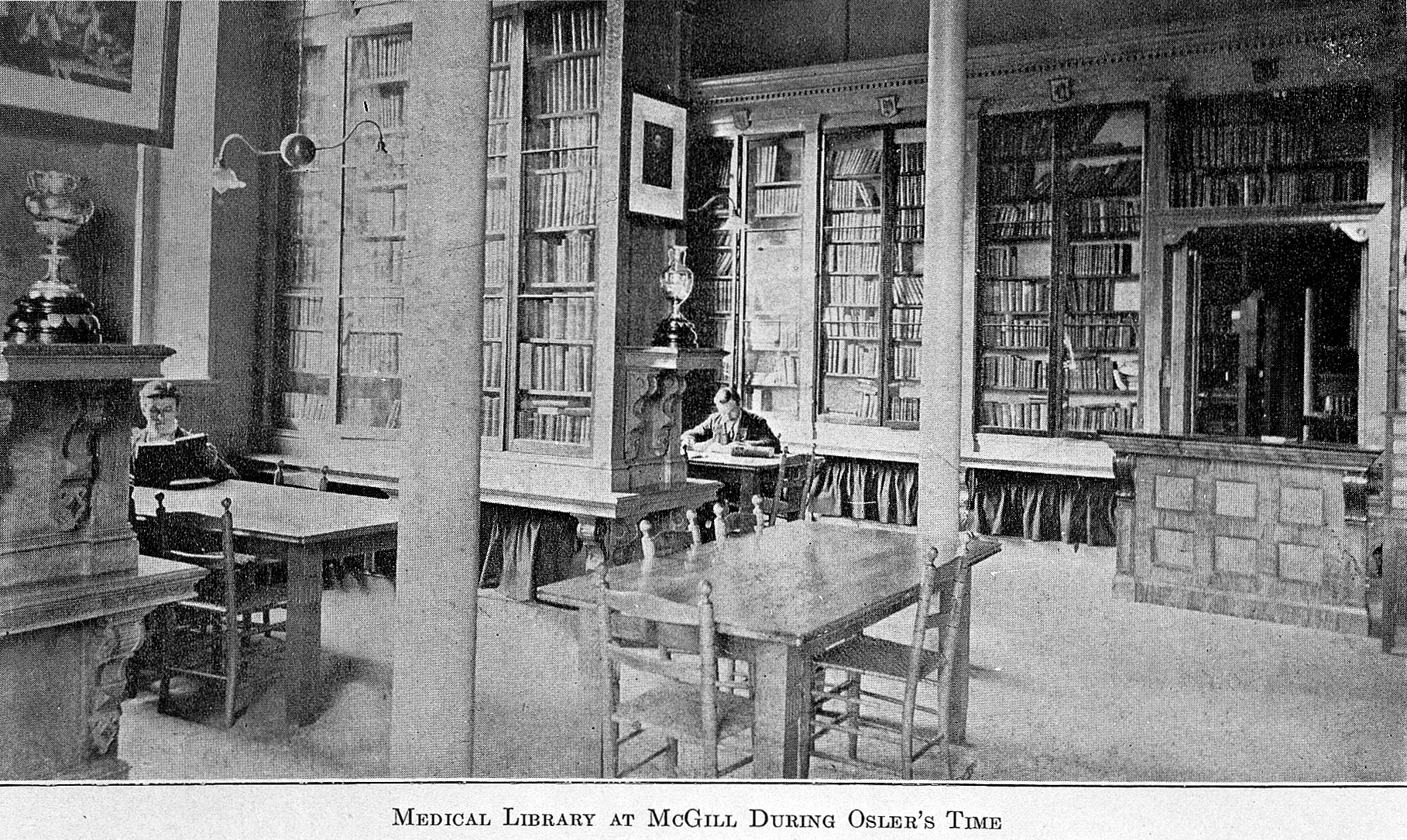
McGill Medical Library in the late 1800s

=== McGill University Medical Library (1895–1914) ===
The McGill University Medical Library was founded on August 27, 1823. It was part of the university's Faculty of Medicine and, as was common practice in the 19th and early 20th centuries, a faculty member held the title of "Librarian". Charlton, who had recently completed a summer course at Amherst College in the newly developed field of librarianship, and is thought to have studied under Melvil Dewey, came to this library in 1895.

Charlton was probably the first person with any formal library training to work at McGill University. Her interest in wider library issues was demonstrated shortly after she arrived, as she was reimbursed $55 for the expense of attending a meeting of the American Library Association in Chicago in 1896. The following year, the British and Canadian medical associations held a joint meeting in Montreal, and it was probably here that Charlton first met prominent Canadian physician William Osler. Osler had graduated from McGill in 1872, and after postgraduate studies in Europe he had returned as a faculty member. He left McGill in 1884 to go to the University of Pennsylvania and by 1897 was at Johns Hopkins University in Baltimore. Osler was always interested in, and supportive of, libraries and had served on the Faculty's Library Committee while at McGill. He was almost certainly eager to meet the newly appointed assistant librarian of his alma mater.

At the time Charlton was appointed Assistant Medical Librarian at McGill University's Medical Library in 1896, the library was 72 years old and was the largest medical library in North America affiliated with a medical school. Typical of the time, the collection was poorly organized and lacked consistent cataloging, an issue that Charlton dedicated her time to, systematizing the library's holdings, introducing user statistics, and creating dedicated reading spaces for students. Upon starting at McGill in 1895, Charlton adopted the newly developed Dewey Decimal Classification system, however, she quickly discovered the Dewey system was not equipped to handle the complexity of medical literature and would later influence the development of specialized medical classification schemes. When Charlton began her career at McGill, the medical library contained 14,000 volumes, and in her tenure, she added 10,000 new volumes, often obtaining donations and persuading publishers and authors to contribute copies. She also promoted the dissemination of research by distributing faculty papers to journals and other universities, and under her direction, the library shifted from a physician-led space to an academic service managed by trained librarians, helping to define medical librarianship as a trusted and necessary role.

Working at a time when Victorian standards discouraged women from holding leadership roles, being outspoken, or even working outside of the home eventually took a toll on Charlton. Correspondences between her and Sir William Osler suggest Charlton sometimes struggled with the interpersonal aspects of her work, with Osler advising and cautioning her to be patient and collegial with staff and faculty and Dr. William Francis describing her personality as having "fervid likes and dislikes." These tensions led to her resignation in 1914 after nearly two decades at McGill. Around the same time, Charlton's mother died. After these two coinciding life events, Charlton left Montreal for a position as a librarian at the Academy of Medicine in Toronto.

=== Academy of Medicine, Toronto (1914–1922) ===
By the early twentieth century, librarianship was undergoing a shift towards greater professionalization, with a focus on formal education and training that expanded librarians' roles as skilled in organizing, collecting, and preserving information, as well as expanding access to information.

In 1914, after leaving her position at McGill University Medical Library in Montreal, Charlton moved to Toronto and was appointed Librarian at the Academy of Medicine, where she continued to dedicate her life's work to the history of medicine until she retired in 1922.

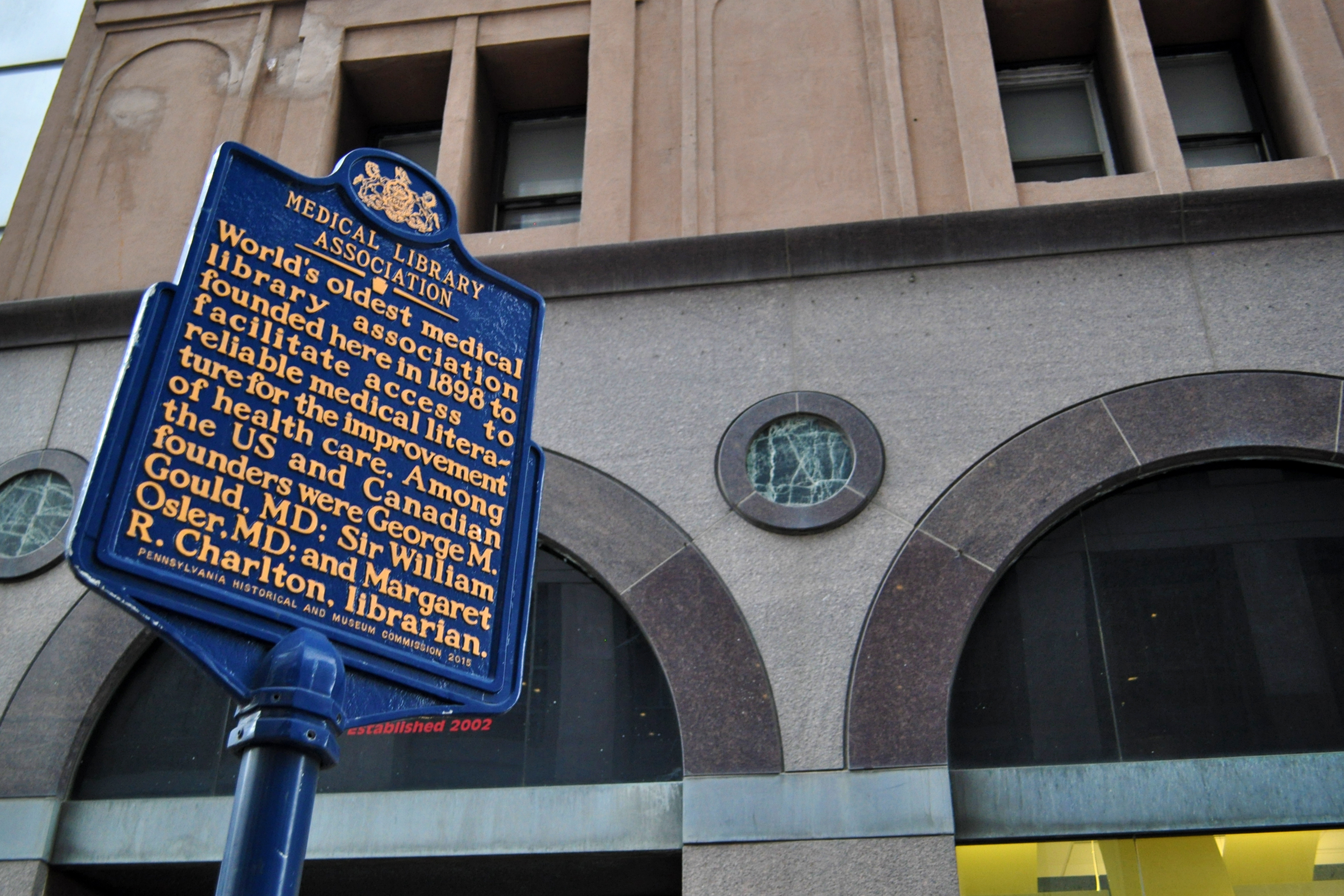
Historical marker at the site where the Medical Library Association was founded in Philadelphia in 1898

== Medical Library Association ==
The late 19th century saw rapid growth in medical publishing, creating a need for organization and shared access to literature and medical professionals began seeing the library as a laboratory and medical journals as tools to help them make medical decisions.

It was in this context that, at the 1897 British and Canadian Medical Association Meeting in Montreal, it is believed Charlton had several conversations with Sir William Osler and Dr. George Milbray Gould discussing the establishment of a medical association, with Charlton writing to Marcia Noyes:

"My dear Miss Noyes: Yes, It was my idea of starting a Medical Library Association. I do not remember if I spoke to Sir William or Dr. Gould first. Yours, M. Charlton"

The idea took root the following year when the Association of Medical Librarians was founded on May 2, 1898, by four librarians and four physicians who met in the office of the Philadelphia Medical Journal, at the invitation of its editor, George M. Gould, M.D. The objective of the Association was the fostering of medical libraries and the maintenance of an exchange of medical literature among its members. Membership was limited to librarians representing medical libraries of at least 500 volumes, with regular library hours and attendance. Charlton was appointed by Dr. Gould to serve as the Association's first Secretary from 1898 to 1903 and again from 1909 to 1911, during which time, in 1907, it became the Medical Library Association. One of the other founding members, Marcia Crocker Noyes who would become the first woman and first non-physician President of the Association in 1933, writes of Margaret Charlton:

Miss Charlton was the one person who indirectly brought the Association into being from speaking with Dr. Osler. She had belonged to the American Library Association. Their problems were not our problems, and she felt lost and that time was wasted, yet she had striven for contact with those doing just the sort of work she was doing. And so she suggested to Dr. Osler that it would be a fine thing if the Medical Libraries could do the same thing the American Library Association was doing.

Charlton was committed to the success of the Association and to the strengthening of medical libraries. She focused on expanding access to medical literature and often wrote to publishers and medical societies, urging them to not only join the Association but also to provide free access to their publications to libraries that were also members. Charlton was also a staunch proponent of medical libraries maintaining their autonomy and not becoming a part of general libraries.

== Writing and scholarship ==
Charlton already had a career in literary journalism when she entered the field of librarianship at McGill and continued writing throughout her life. Her early essays included historical sketches for the Dominion Illustrated Monthly under the pseudonym Lynn Hetherington, a name she borrowed from an ancestral family home in northern England.

Between 1909 and 1913, Charlton published several articles on topics ranging from the Indigenous leader Tecumseh and the fur traders' Beaver Club to missionary Father Lacombe, and Elizabeth Simcoe, the wife of Ontario's first governor. She later focused her writing on Canadian medical history, including a piece on Christopher Widmer, an early Ontario physician and veteran of the War of 1812, and on Louis Hébert, whom she described as "Quebec's first surgeon." Her writings also highlighted the contributions of women to Canadian history, including her feature on Jeanne Mance, founder of Montreal's Hôtel-Dieu Hospital and a proponent of compassionate care and treatment of mental illness.

Charlton was one of the first writers to document historical developments in medicine in Canada, and between 1923 and 1924, she published a series of articles in Annals of Medical History on the history of medicine in Lower Canada, mainly Quebec. The four-part series included features on medicine in Quebec during the French regime (1608-1759), early epidemics in Lower Canada, including St. Paul's Disease and Molbay Disease, and the evolution of medical licensing and the growth of medical practices. In her fourth and final article in the series, Charlton detailed the history and evolution of medical education in Montreal, including medical education prior to formal medical schools as well as the early days of formal medical education in Quebec.

=== Publications ===
Charlton collaborated with author Caroline Augusta Fraser on two collections of children’s stories published in Montreal in the 1890s:

- Charlton, Margaret R.; Fraser, C. A. (1892). A Wonder Web of Stories. Montreal: John Lovell & Son.
- Charlton, Margaret R.; Fraser, C. A. (1894). With Printless Foot. Montreal: John Lovell & Son.

Between 1923 and 1924, Charlton published a four-part series in the Annals of Medical History examining the development of medicine in Lower Canada:

- Charlton, Margaret R. (1923). "Outlines of the History of Medicine in Lower Canada under the French Regime, 1608–1759." Annals of Medical History, 5, 150–174.
- Charlton, Margaret R. (1923). "Outlines of the History of Medicine in Lower Canada. Continued." Annals of Medical History, 5, 263–278.
- Charlton, Margaret R. (1924). "“Outlines of the History of Medicine in Lower Canada under the English Regime." Annals of Medical History, 6, 222–235.
- Charlton, Margaret R. (1924). "Outlines of the History of Medicine in Lower Canada. Conclusion." Annals of Medical History, 6, 312–354.

Other selected publications:

- Charlton, Margaret Ridley (1922). "Christopher Widner, 1780-1858: a veteran of the War of 1812 and the first qualified physician in York." Annals of Medical History, 4: 346-350.

== Later life ==
After retiring from the Academy of Medicine in Toronto in 1922, Charlton returned to Montreal to live with her sisters. She was involved in an accident while on a train ride from Toronto to Montreal, where a heavy electric light globe fell on her head, causing her considerable pain for the rest of her life. She died there on May 1, 1931, nine years after the accident, at the age of 72.

== Honours and commemorations ==
=== National recognitions ===
- Charlton was designated a National Historic Person of Canada in 2003 by the Historic Sites and Monuments Board of Canada. The designation recognizes Canadians whose work has had a lasting national impact.
- On 1 May 2006, the Government of Canada unveiled a commemorative plaque at the Osler Library of the History of Medicine at McGill University to mark her national historic significance. It is displayed near plaques for William Osler and Maude Abbott.

=== Professional association recognitions ===
- In 1976, during the seventy fifth anniversary of the Medical Library Association, the organization produced a commemorative medal depicting Charlton alongside Sir William Osler and Dr. George Milbry Gould. It was given as a keepsake honoring the three founders of the Association.
- Charlton is also named on a historical marker in Philadelphia at the site where the Medical Library Association was founded in 1898, recognizing her as one of the Association's original founders.

=== Awards named in her honour ===
- In 2004, the Canadian Health Libraries Association and the Association des bibliotheques de la sante du Canada renamed their Award for Outstanding Achievement as the Margaret Ridley Charlton Award for Outstanding Achievement. The award recognizes individuals who have made significant contributions to health sciences librarianship in Canada.
