= Mary Marshall =

Mary Marshall may refer to:

- Mary A. R. Marshall (1921–1992), American civic activist and member of the Virginia House of Delegates
- Mary Adamson Anderson Marshall (1837–1910), Scottish physician and a member of the Edinburgh Seven
- Mary Louise Marshall (1893–1986), American librarian and professor of medical bibliography
- Mary Magdalene Marshall (1783–1877), American hotelier and philanthropist
- Mary Marshall, stage name of Mary Grace Borel (1915–1998), American socialite and film actress
- Mary Marshall Dyer, née Marshall (1780–1867), American voice for the anti-Shakerism sentiment in rural New Hampshire
- Mary Paley Marshall (1850–1944), English economist
