= Fielding Hudson Garrison =

American medical historian (1870–1935)

Fielding H Garrison
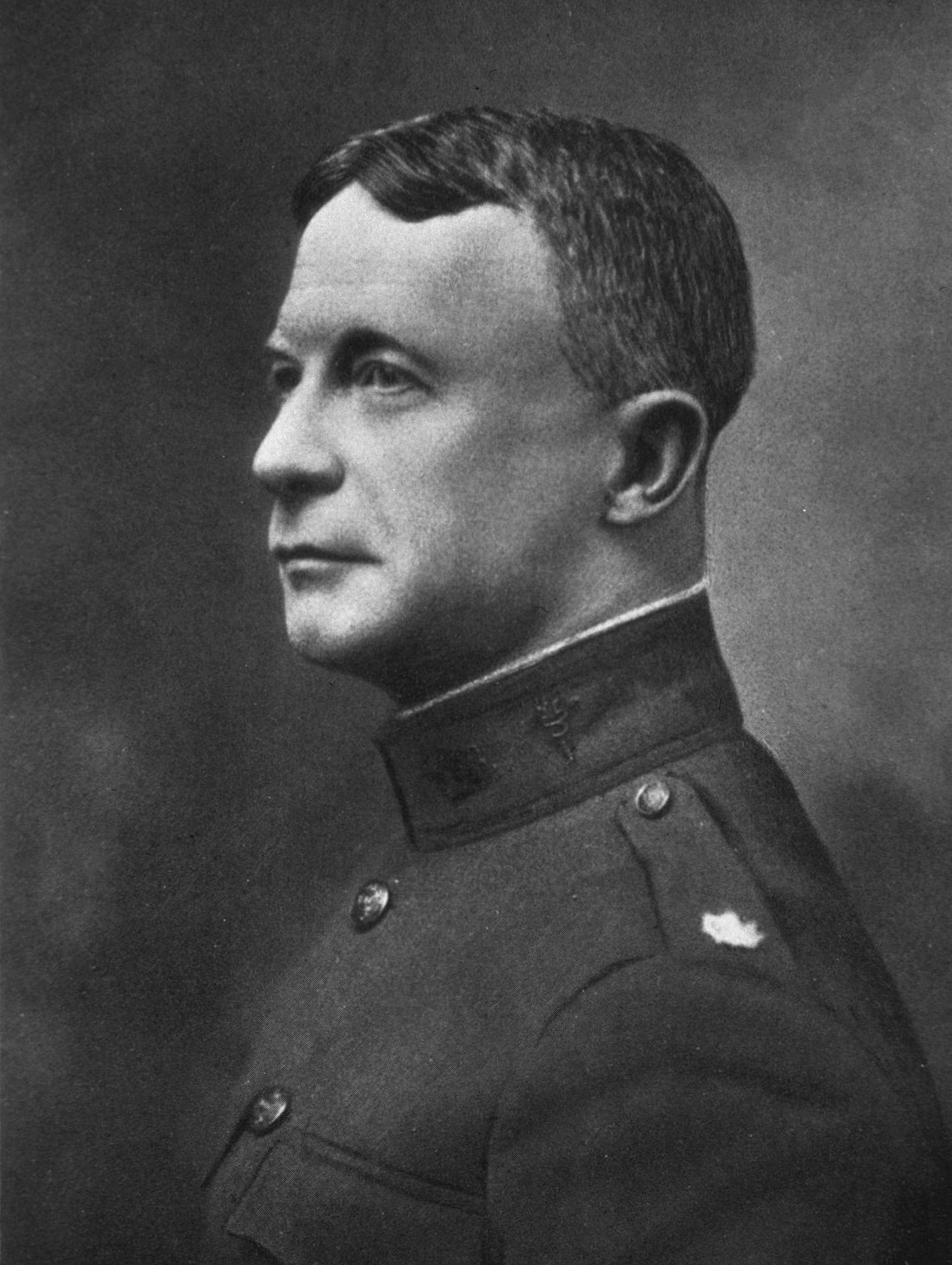
- Born: November 5, 1870
- Died: April 18, 1935 (aged 64); Baltimore, Maryland, US
- Resting place: Arlington National Cemetery; 38°52′19.1″N 77°04′19.5″W
- Education: Johns Hopkins University; BA (1890); Georgetown University; MD (1893)
- Occupations: Historian; Bibliographer; Librarian
- Years active: 1891–1935
- Employers: Army Medical Library; New York Academy of Medicine; Welch Medical Library
- Known for: Serving nearly 40 years at the Army Medical Library, helped to develop the Index Medicus from 1903 to 1927 which paved the way for MEDLINE

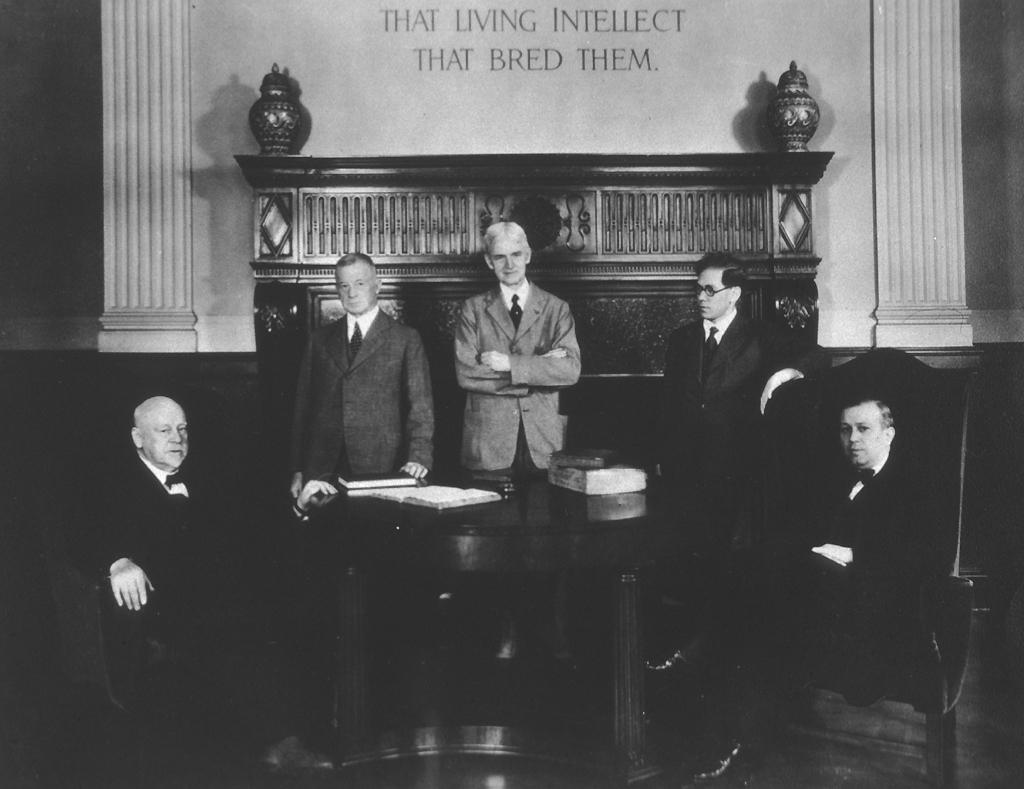
Five Johns Hopkins University staff: L to R, Standing: Fielding H. Garrison, John Rathbone Oliver, and Owsei Temkin; Seated: William Henry Welch and Henry E. Sigerist; Photo ca. 1932.

Colonel Fielding Hudson Garrison, MD (November 5, 1870 – April 18, 1935) was an acclaimed medical historian, bibliographer, and librarian of medicine. Garrison's An Introduction to the History of Medicine (1913) is a landmark text in this field.

== Biography ==
Garrison was born in Washington, D.C., and received his A.B. in 1890 from the Johns Hopkins University and his M.D. in 1893 from Georgetown University. The son of U.S. Treasury Comptroller John Rowzee Garrison and noted Washington, D.C., civic volunteer Catherine Jane Jennie Davis, he married Clara Augusta Brown in 1910 in Washington, D.C., and they eventually had three daughters. (Garrison was brother-in-law — they married sisters in a double wedding — to Henry Campbell Black, author of "Black's Law Dictionary.)

Garrison joined the staff of the Army Medical Library as a clerk in 1891. (The AML was to become the National Library of Medicine many years after Garrison's death.) He became Assistant Librarian in 1899 and Principal Assistant Librarian in 1912. He joined the Officers Reserve Corps as a Major in 1917 (Lieutenant Colonel, 1918 and Colonel, 1920). Garrison was assigned to index medical literature. In this he worked closely with John Shaw Billings. He helped create and compile the Index-Catalogue of the Library of the Surgeon General's Office. His editorial responsibilities also included the Index Medicus, of which he was Associate Editor (1903–1912) and Editor (1912–1927). He was also Associate Editor of the Quarterly Cumulative Index Medicus for 1927–1929. Garrison wrote the first comprehensive treatise on the history of medicine and "gained recognition as the foremost American authority on the subject" (according to the Dictionary of American Biography). He prepared plans and collected material for the history of the U.S. Army Medical Department during World War I. In all, he served on staff at the AML for almost 40 years.

From 1930, Garrison was lecturer in the history of medicine and librarian of the Welch Medical Library of the Johns Hopkins University. He was also a much-respected editor and translator, as well as an accomplished classical pianist.

Garrison died April 18, 1935, in Washington, D.C., and is buried in Arlington National Cemetery, Arlington, Virginia.

== Positions, honors and accolades ==
- Presidency, American Association for the History of Medicine
- Presidency, Medical Library Association
- Directorship, Johns Hopkins Institute of the History of Medicine (for one year following the retirement of William H. Welch)
- Consulting Librarian, New York Academy of Medicine (1925–30)
- Fellow, American College of Surgeons

== Legacy ==
- Garrison was a close friend of noted literary critic H. L. Mencken, with whom he exchanged 400 letters, some of which have been published in Mencken's collected letters. Mencken was a pallbearer at Garrison's funeral.
- Garrison was the subject of two biographies by Solomon Kagan, and the April, 1937 issue of The Bulletin of the History of Medicine was devoted to essays about Garrison's life and contributions.
- Garrison's book Introduction to the History of Medicine was the first comprehensive American publication on the history of medicine. For this book he compiled a bibliography of major works in the history of medicine. This listing, later amended by Leslie Morton, was eventually published as a separate piece. Garrison and Morton's A Medical Bibliography is still widely regarded as a standard in medical historical bibliography.
- Garrison's portrait hangs in the History of Medicine Division Reading Room of the United States National Library of Medicine, Bethesda, MD where most of his papers have been deposited.

== Bibliography ==
=== Books ===
- Garrison, Fielding (1913). An introduction to the history of medicine with medical chronology bibliographic data and test questions. Philadelphia: W. B. Saunders Company. OCLC 17420225. (NLM) 54830780R.
  - 2nd Edition, 1917.
  - 3rd Edition, revised and enlarged; Philadelphia: W.B. Saunders Co, 1921.
  - Garrison, Fielding (1929). An Introduction to the History of Medicine with medical chronology, suggestions for study and bibliographic data (Fourth ed.). Philadelphia: W. B. Saunders Company. (NLM) 54830820R.
- Garrison, Fielding (1915). John Shaw Billings A Memoir. New York: G. P. Putnam's Sons. hdl:2027/nyp.33433082549811. (NLM) 55230270R.
- Garrison, Fielding (1922). Notes on the History of Military Medicine. Washington: Association of military surgeons. ISBN 9780342493470. LCCN 24015366. OCLC 4903168. (NLM) 14120040R.
- Garrison, Fielding H. (1933/1943), A Medical Bibliography (amended by Leslie Morton)

=== Journals ===
- Garrison FH (1909). "Josiah Willard Gibbs and his relation to modern science" . Popular Science Monthly. 75 (August 1909): 191–203.
- Garrison FH (October 1919). "The use of the caduceus in the insignia of the army medical officer". Bulletin of the Medical Library Association. 9 (2): 13–16. PMC 234831. PMID 16015887.
- Garrison FH (July 1919). "Library of the surgeon-general's office". Bulletin of the Medical Library Association. 9 (1): 8–9. PMC 235621. PMID 16015882.
- Garrison FH (May 17, 1919). "The prehistory of the caduceus". Journal of the American Medical Association. 72 (20): 1483. doi:10.1001/jama.1919.02610200055029. ISSN 0002-9955.
- Garrison FH (1919). "The Babylonian Caduceus". Mil. Surg. XLIV: 633–36.
- Garrison F (April 1926). "Halstedformat=PDF". American Mercury. 7 (28): 396–401.
