= Index Medicus =

Index to medical literature

- Producer: United States National Library of Medicine (United States)

Coverage
- Disciplines: medical science
- Record depth: Index
- Format coverage: journal articles

Print edition
- Print title: Index Medicus
- Print dates: 1879-2004
- ISSN: 0019-3879

Index Medicus (IM) was a comprehensive bibliographic index of life science, biomedical science, and medical research articles, published from 1879 to 2004. Medical history experts have said of Index Medicus that it is “America's greatest contribution to medical knowledge.” It was published as a print index until 2004; beginning in the 1960s, it was also published as an electronic database, MEDLARS. Index Medicus content from 1940s to 2004 was incorporated into MEDLINE and PubMed; older medical literature, however, is not electronically available. Today, the title Index Medicus is also used to refer to a curated subset of PubMed.

== Function ==
The function of Index Medicus is to give people around the world access to quality medical journal literature. To this end, the publishers of Index Medicus must perform at least two vital activities: determine which literature is good (has quality) and provide access.

=== Journal selection ===
Early in the history of Index Medicus, quality was determined by manually sifting through publications and choosing what subjectively seemed good, but later the Editor of Index Medicus convened a committee of world experts to identify the world's best medical journals and then have citations for articles from those journals made accessible. Inclusion into the Index Medicus is not automatic and depends on a journal's scientific policy and scientific quality. The journal selection criteria are evaluated by the "Literature Selection Technical Review Committee" and the final decision is made by the NLM director. The review process may include outside reviewers and journals may be dropped from inclusion.

=== Access ===
From 1879 until the computer age, access was provided solely by paper publication of the Index. The challenge was how to structure this index so as to make it most useful. To that end, the publishers of Index Medicus created an indexing language. Later this language became the Medical Subject Headings (MeSH). MeSH is a comprehensive controlled vocabulary, and indexers paid by the publisher go through all articles to be included in the Index and identify each article with several, key concepts (each represented by a term) from MeSH. The paper publication of Index Medicus would then show a listing of the MeSH terms with pointers to each citation that was indexed with that term, and users could find relevant literature by going from the term to the citation.

== History ==
Index Medicus was begun by John Shaw Billings, head of the Library of the Surgeon General's Office, United States Army. This library later evolved into the United States National Library of Medicine (NLM). For such a major publication over many years the history naturally involved many changes as people died and sources of funding changed.

=== Years of paper publication ===
Index Medicus publication began in 1879 and continued monthly through 1926, with a hiatus between 1899 and 1902. During this hiatus, a similar index, the Bibliographia medica, was published in French by the Institut de Bibliographie in Paris. The edition was edited by Charles Richet, Henri de Rothschild and G.M. Debove, while Marcel Baudoin ruled as editor in chief and also as director of the Parish institute of bibliography. The first volume of Index Medicus appeared in January 1879 and was listed as compiled under the supervision of John Shaw Billings and Robert Fletcher, while later volumes were listed as co-edited by Billings and Fletcher.

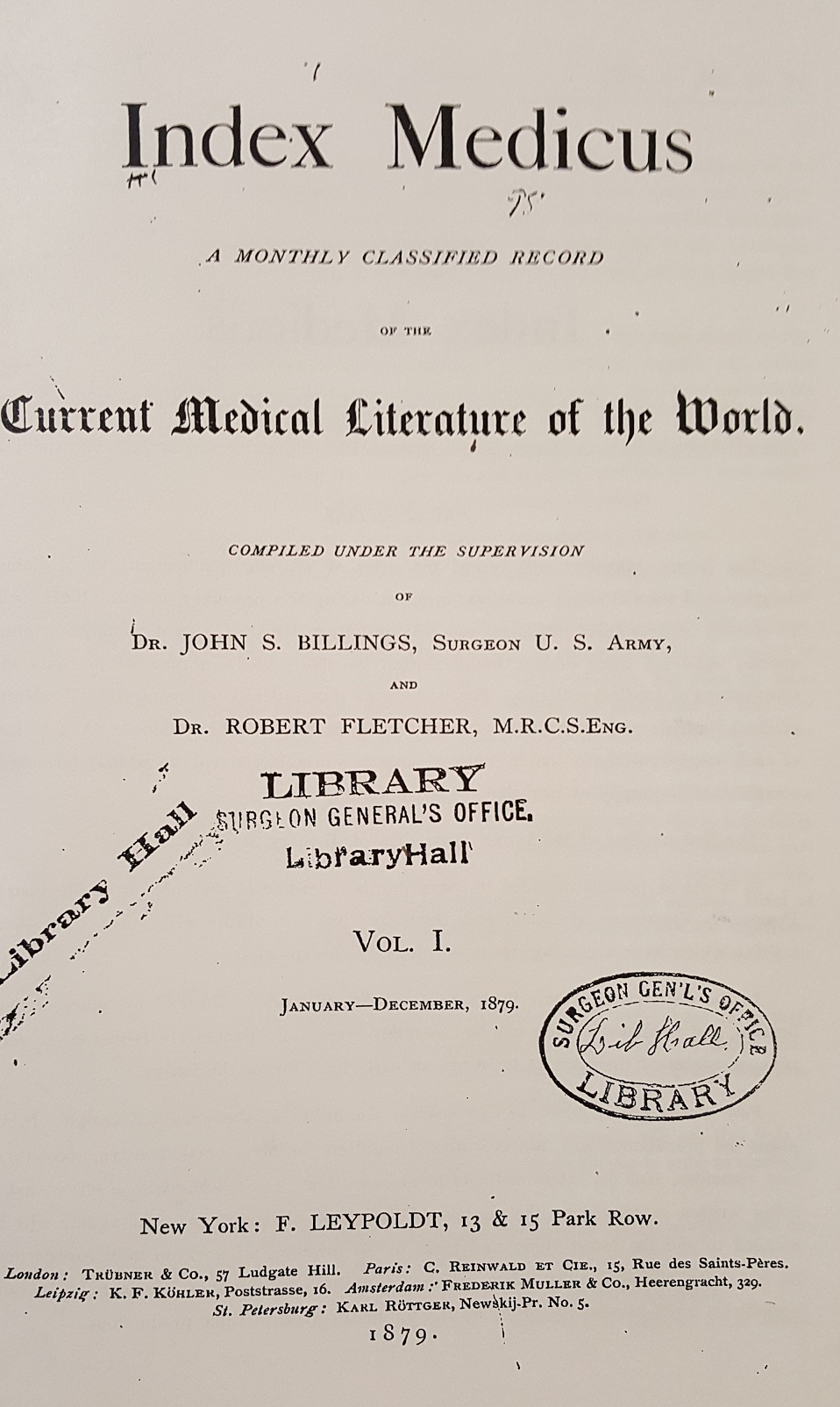
This front page of the first edition of Index Medicus was published in January 1879.

Billings retired from the National Library of Medicine in 1895. For most of the period from 1876 to 1912 Robert Fletcher was the Editor or Co-editor of Index Medicus. In 1903 Fielding Garrison became Co-editor and continued as Editor or Co-editor until 1917. Albert Allemann was Editor from 1918 to 1932 when Index Medicus was suspended from 1933 to 1936 due to the Great Depression.

For the 125 years that Index Medicus was published in paper form, getting funding was a challenge, and in 1927 the American Medical Association began publishing it. The Index Medicus was amalgamated with the American Medical Association's Quarterly Cumulative Index to Current Literature (QCICL) as the Quarterly Cumulative Index Medicus (QCIM) in 1927 and the AMA continued to publish this until 1956. From 1960 to 2004 the printed edition was published by the National Library of Medicine under the name Index Medicus/Cumulated Index Medicus (IM/CIM). An abridged version was published from 1970 to 1997 as the Abridged Index Medicus. Harold Jones was editor from 1936 to 1945; Frank Rogers, from 1949 to 1963; Clifford Bachrach from 1969 to 1985; Roy Rada from 1985 to 1988; and from 1988 until it ceased paper publication in 2004 it was produced by the NLM's Bibliographic Services Division. The abridged edition is a subset of the journals covered by PubMed ("core clinical journals"). The last issue of Index Medicus was published in December 2004 (Volume 45). The stated reason for discontinuing the printed publication was that online resources had supplanted it, most especially PubMed, which continues to include the Index as a subset of the journals it covers.

=== Evolution from Print to Digital ===
In the 1960s, the NLM began computerizing the indexing work by creating MEDLARS, a bibliographic database, which became MEDLINE (MEDLARS online) in 1971 when the NLM offered MEDLARS searches "online" to other medical libraries, and remote computers able to log into the NLM MEDLARS system.

Index Medicus thus (after 1965) became the print presentation of the MEDLINE database's content, which users accessed usually by visiting a library which subscribed to Index Medicus (for example, a university scientist at the university library). It continued in this role through the 1980s and 1990s, while various electronic presentations of MEDLINE's content also evolved, first with proprietary online services (accessed mostly at libraries) and later with CD-ROMs, then with Entrez and PubMed (1996).

As users gradually migrated from print to online use, Index Medicus print subscriptions dwindled. During the 1990s, the dissemination of home internet connections, the launch of the Web and web browsers, and the launch of PubMed greatly accelerated the shift of online access to MEDLINE from something one did at the library to something one did anywhere. This dissemination, along with the superior usability of search compared with use of a print index in serving the user's purpose (which is to distill relevant subsets of information from a vast superset), caused the use of MEDLINE's print output, Index Medicus, to drop precipitously. In 2004, print publication ceased.

Today, Index Medicus and Abridged Index Medicus still exist conceptually as content curation services that curate MEDLINE content into search subsets or database views (in other words, subsets of MEDLINE records from some journals but not others). Biomedical journals indexed in MEDLINE, as well as those listed in Index Medicus, are almost always quality journals because the National Library of Medicine will not index junk journals. (See the External links, below, for links to pages on the National Library of Medicine website that contain a list of journals indexed in MEDLINE; journals listed in Index Medicus; and a list of Abridged Index Medicus journals (also known as "Core clinical" journals). (Note: Journals indexed in MEDLINE "... contain articles predominantly on core biomedical subjects." Consequently, many good journals in psychology and the social sciences, for example, are not indexed in MEDLINE.)

== See also ==
- EMBASE
