= Informationist =

An informationist (or information specialist in context) provides research and knowledge management services in the context of clinical care or biomedical research.

Although there is no one educational pathway or formalized set of skills or knowledge for informationists, one way to think of the informationist is as one who possesses the knowledge and skill of a medical librarian with extensive research specialization and some formal clinical or public health education that goes beyond on-the-job osmosis.

Medical librarians and other biomedical professional organizations have been exploring the possibilities for evaluating how informationists are being used and whether their activities supplement or replace medical library activity.

More generally, an informationist is a professional who works with information within a particular business, analytic or scientific context to drive toward outcomes based on evidence, analysis, prediction and execution. For example, an extension of the term is increasingly emerging in financial services, life sciences and health care industries. Though still nascently in use, its adoption applies to individuals with extensive industry expertise, acute familiarity with organizational structures and processes, deep domain level information mastery and information systems technical savvy. Informationists in this context support transformational initiatives within and across functional areas of an enterprise as architects, governance experts, continuous improvement advocates and strategists.

== Background ==
The term was proposed in 2000 by Davidoff & Florance. Their editorial suggested that physicians should be delegating their information needs to informationists, just as they currently order CT scans from radiologists or cardiac catheterizations from cardiologists. They conceived of an information professional who was embedded in (and indeed, supported by) the clinical departments.

Supporters of the concept see it as a means for librarians to reinvigorate connections with the faculty/clinicians, as well as provide superior service by dint of informationists' biomedical training. Critics complained that the idea is nothing new; librarians already provide in-depth, high quality information services and clinical medical librarians have been working alongside physicians, nurses and other clinicians for years.

Large informationist programs in the U.S. exist at the National Institutes of Health and at Vanderbilt University. Welch Medical Library at Johns Hopkins University (JHU) is developing an informationist service model in which its 10 clinical and public health librarians are moving from serving as liaison librarians for assigned departments toward becoming embedded informationists within their departments.

To prepare for the embedded informationist role, librarians are undertaking education as needed to supplement their backgrounds. For example, librarians bring experience in clinical behavior counseling, public health, nursing, and more. Informationist training can then focus upon filling gaps in research methods knowledge more so than on gaining additional knowledge in the librarian's area of expertise. Courses, seminars and workshops being undertaken include those covering systematic reviews, evidence-based medicine, critical appraisal, medical language, anatomy and physiology, biostatistics, and clinical research.

The term informationist is related to that of informatician—also informaticist—and many informationists do possess skills in clinical topics, bioinformatics, and biomedical informatics. Harvard University, the University of Pittsburgh, and Washington University in St. Louis are examples of institutional libraries which have hired PhD-level scientists (who may or may not have library degrees) to provide informatics support for biomedical research.
