= Lucretia W. McClure =

American medical librarian (1925–2019)

Lucretia W. McClure (1925-October 17, 2019) was an American medical librarian. McClure was a director at the Edward G. Miner library, University of Rochester Medical Center. She worked at Boston Medical Library from 1994 to 2011. McClure worked for decades within the Medical Library Association, including serving as President (1990–91). She is the only person to have been interviewed twice for the MLA Oral History Project, first in 1998 and again in 2015.

== Early life and education ==
McClure was born in Denver, USA and was an avid user of public libraries as a child. She graduated from University of Missouri at Columbia in 1945, with a bachelor's degree in journalism. After raising a family in Rochester, New York, she moved back to Colorado for a year, earning her master's in library science in 1964 from the Graduate School of Librarianship, University of Denver.

== Research and career ==
Upon returning to Rochester, McClure began her first of many librarian roles, first as a cataloger in the University of Rochester Medical Center Edward G. Miner Library. She took on many more roles, including Associate Librarian Serials Librarian, Reference Librarian, and eventually Director of the library. She was also Assistant and then Associate Professor of Medical Bibliography. As her career progressed, she assisted patrons with literature searches, overseeing the process as it went from a manual one to an automated one, through things like the SUNY Biomedical Communication Network and eventually, MEDLINE.

Beyond the myriad of librarian roles, McClure was editor for the monograph Health Sciences Environment and Librarianship in Health Sciences Libraries and frequently wrote academic articles across library science journals.

== Awards and recognition ==
The Lucretia W. McClure Excellence in Education Award was established in 1998 by the MLA, and it honors practicing librarians and/or library educators active in the MLA and have demonstrated skills in mentoring, research, leadership, or teaching. Awards given to her include the Holloway Award for Contributions to the Profession, Archivists, and Librarians in the History of the Health Sciences (2003), the MLA President's Award (1995), and the Distinguished Service Award from the University of Rochester (1992). She is inducted into the Massachusetts Health Sciences Libraries Network Hall of Fame as of 2006 and at the 113th Medical Library Association Annual meeting, May 6, 2013 was declared Lucretia McClure Day.
