= Gloria Werner =

American librarian (1940–2021)

- Gloria Werner, from a 2015 web profile
- Born: Gloria H. Stolzoff; December 12, 1940; Seattle, Washington
- Died: March 5, 2021 (aged 80); Los Angeles, California
- Occupation: Librarian

Gloria Stolzoff Werner (December 12, 1940 – March 5, 2021) was an American librarian. She worked for forty years, from 1962 to 2002, as a librarian at the University of California, Los Angeles (UCLA), including twelve years as University Librarian. She served a term as president of the Association of Research Libraries in 1997.

== Early life ==
Gloria H. Stolzoff was born in Seattle. She graduated from Oberlin College in 1961, with a degree in art history. While at Oberlin, she wrote for the Oberlin Review. She earned a master's degree in library science from the University of Washington in 1962.

== Career ==
Werner began working at UCLA in 1962, and trained as a medical librarian there. She became a reference librarian, then associate university librarian, and finally succeeding Russell Shank as university librarian, holding that rank from 1990 to 2002. During her tenure, the university's library systems moved from card catalog to an online catalog, and the library's buildings underwent a complex seismic retrofitting. She supported the creation of the Southern Regional Library Facility, opened in 1987. She served on UCLA's Women and Philanthropy board, and was a governor of the UCLA Foundation. She retired as University Librarian Emerita in 2002, and received the UCLA Alumni Association’s University Service Award in 2013.

Outside of UCLA, Werner edited the journal of the Medical Library Association, was president of the Association of Research Libraries in 1997. She also served on the Docent Council of the Los Angeles County Museum of Art (LACMA).

== Personal life ==
Stolzoff married chemistry professor Newton Davis Werner. They had a son, Adam. She was widowed when Newton Werner died in 2000; she died in 2021 aged 80 in Los Angeles.
