= Roy Rada =

American Professor emeritus of information systems (b. 1951)

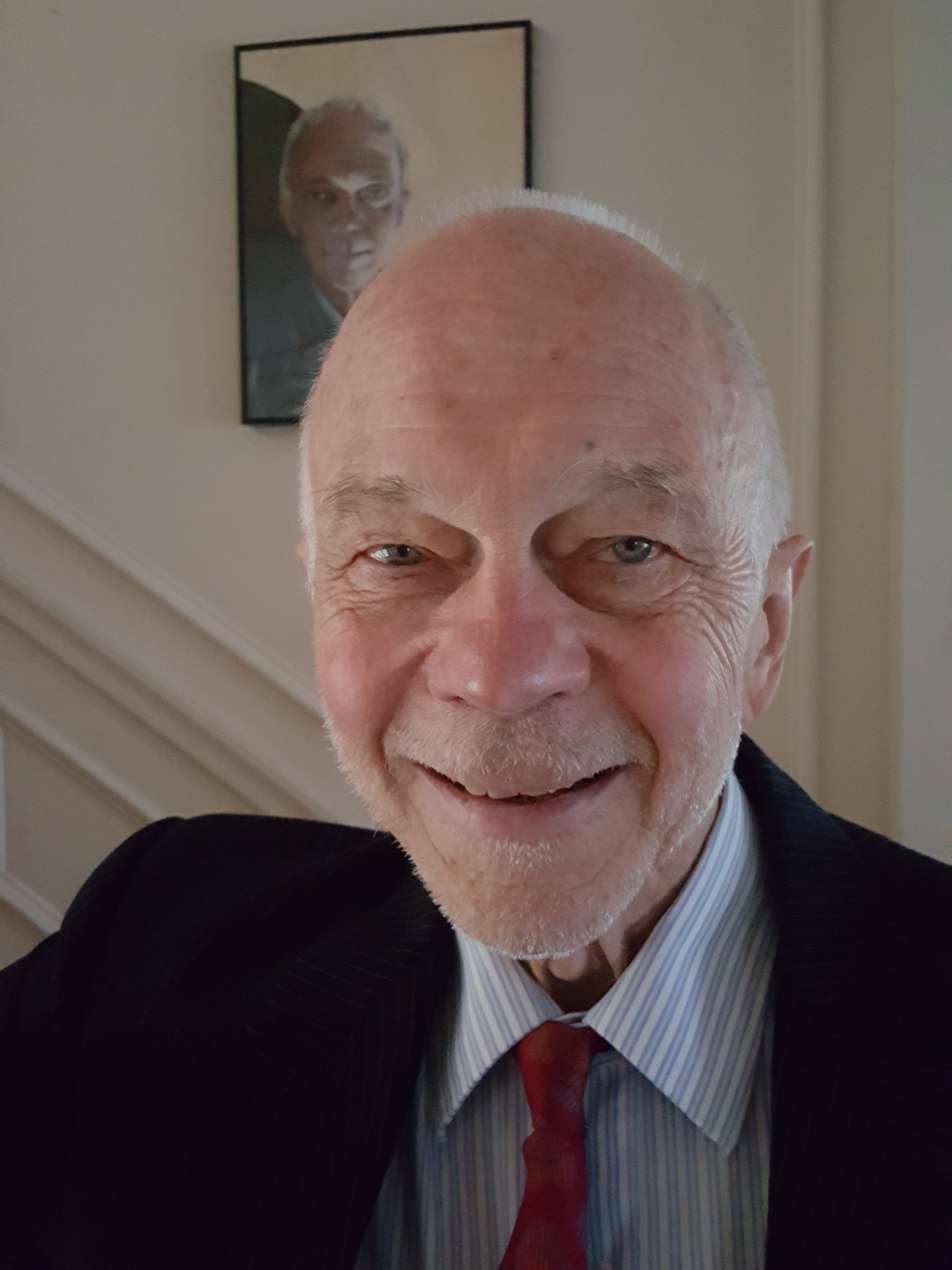
- Born: June 13, 1951 (age 75)
- Education: Yale University; University of Illinois; Baylor College of Medicine
- Scientific career
- Fields: Artificial intelligence Semantic web
- Workplaces: UMBC; National Institutes of Health; University of Liverpool; Washington State University; Wayne State University
- Thesis: Evolutionary Structure and Search (1981)
- Doctoral advisor: David Waltz
- Website: www.radatrust.org

Roy F Rada (born June 13, 1951) is a professor emeritus whose research in computer science and information systems appeared in journal articles from 1979 till 2025.

== Early life and education ==
Rada was born in Vienna, Austria in 1951. He graduated from Yale University in 1973 with a B.Sc. in Psychology, from Baylor College of Medicine in 1977 with a M.D., and from University of Illinois at Urbana-Champaign in 1981 with a Ph.D. in Computer Science. Rada was licensed to practice medicine from 1977 to 1988.

== Career ==
Rada worked with Michael Conrad at Wayne State University from 1981 to 1983. He worked at the National Institutes of Health from 1983 to 1988 where he was chief of the Medical Subject Headings Section of the National Library of Medicine and editor of Index Medicus. From 1988 to 1995 he was a professor of Computer Science at the University of Liverpool. From 1995 to 1998 he was the Boeing Distinguished Professor of Software Engineering at Washington State University in Pullman, Washington. Rada was the first director of the Online Masters in Information Systems at the University of Maryland, Baltimore County that was launched on Blackboard in 1999, and he retired in 2015 as a Professor Emeritus of Information Systems at the University of Maryland, Baltimore County. Rada's research assistant Karl Strickland was imprisoned in 1993 for hacking in a landmark British case, and his student Harold T. Martin III was arrested for security breaches. Rada was chair of the Association for Computing Machinery, Special Interest Group on Biomedical Computing from 1990 to 1997. He was the Founding Chair of the Healthcare Information and Management Systems Society Special Interest Group on the Health Insurance Portability and Accountability Act for which he was awarded the Outstanding SIG Member Award in 2002.

== Research ==
At the National Institutes of Health, Rada's team showed how various medical knowledge bases could be semi-automatically combined to improve information retrieval. That work led to his being honored as a winner of the 1990 Eliot Prize for a work judged most effective in furthering medical librarianship. One of the tools that Rada's team developed to facilitate using medical knowledge in retrieving information was spreading activation across semantic nets. Semantic nets underlying documents are traversed to facilitate individuals handling single documents, groups working across the Internet to access or create documents, and organizations manipulating libraries. Software engineers link their code and documentation semi-automatically to facilitate collaboration in building software systems, and students benefit from peer-peer commenting online. Rada's book on hypertext was published in paperback and also simultaneously in multiple electronic formats, including Guide and HyperTIES. Rada formed an electronic publishing company called Hypermedia Solutions Limited in 1993, and that company helped make the first multimedia CD-ROM published in web format. Sixteen Ph.D. students earned their degrees under Rada's supervision. For his contributions to computing, Rada was elected a Fellow of the Association for Computing Machinery.

== Philanthropy ==
In 2023 Rada formalized and funded the Rada Research Trust. In 2024 he endowed four university scholarships, each titled “Rada Scholarship in AI and Healthcare”, and in 2025, a school district award for teachers, the “Dr Roy Rada Family Legacy Fund”.
