= Gwendolyn S. Cruzat =

American librarian and educator

Gwendolyn Cruzat
- Born: c. 1930 (age c. 94); Chicago, Illinois, United States
- Education: Fisk University (BA); Atlanta University (MA); Wayne State University (PhD)

Gwendolyn Stiggins Cruzat (born c. 1930) is professor emerita of the University of Michigan School of Information and Library Studies. Her teaching and scholarship made significant contributions to medical librarianship. Cruzat was named one of the 100 most notable medical librarians by the Medical Library Association in 1998.

== Early life and education ==
Gwendolyn Stiggins was born in Chicago, Illinois. She grew up in Midland, Pennsylvania. She earned a bachelor's degree in mathematics from Fisk University in 1951 and a Master of Library Science degree from Atlanta University in 1954. Her 1954 master's thesis was titled "A Study of the Relationship Between the Books Selected by Children Who Patronize the Negro Branches of the Atlanta Public Library and Their Television Interests". In 1976, she went on to receive a PhD in higher education/information science from Wayne State University, writing her thesis on collective bargaining in academic librarianship.

== Career ==
Cruzat was the head of reference at her alma mater, Fisk University, from 1954 to 1960. She moved to Detroit in 1960, working at the Harper Hospital Library from 1960 to 1964. In 1964, she was offered and accepted a position as a research librarian at the Wayne State University medical school library, where she worked until 1970. In that role, she directed the school's internship program in medical librarianship.

In 1970, Cruzat joined the University of Michigan's School of Information and Library Studies as a lecturer. She became a full professor in 1979. Cruzat established a medical librarianship concentration at the school and chaired the doctoral program. She was also instrumental in the creation of an online teaching laboratory where students could gain skills in database searching and cataloging. Cruzat retired from her faculty position in 1993.

== Service to the library community ==
Cruzat was a visiting faculty member at multiple universities and served as a consultant for agencies such as the U.S. Department of Education, the National Library of Medicine, and the Library of Congress. In addition to special assignments in Hawaii and Puerto Rico, she traveled to Brazil, teaching workshops on government publications and working as a consultant for the Brazilian Regional Medical Library.

Cruzat was active in the Medical Library Association, with leadership roles including chairing the Medical Library Education Section as well as the Library Research Section. She also was active in leadership positions at the American Library Association (ALA). From 1978 to 1980, she chaired the ALA Ad Hoc Committee on Collective Bargaining. Cruzat served on the ALA Committee on Accreditation from 1984 to 1986, pushing for cultural diversity in institutions teaching library science.

She served as a member of the National Library of Medicine's Board of Regents from 1981 to 1984.

== Legacy ==
Cruzat was awarded the Distinguished Service Award by the University of Michigan in 1977; she was the first person in the university's library school to receive the honor.

She was selected for the Medical Library Association's Janet Doe Lectureship in 1979, giving a talk titled "Medical Librarianship: A Systems Perspective". She was recognized as a lifelong Fellow of the association in 1993. The Medical Library Association also recognized her as one of their 100 most notable medical librarians in 1998.

In 1989, she received the Distinguished Alumna Award from the Atlanta University School of Information and Library Studies.

At her retirement in 1993, the University of Michigan named Cruzat Professor Emeritus of Information and Library Studies.

Her alma mater Fisk University awarded her with an honorary Doctor of Humane Letters in 2006.
