= Harold W. Jones =

American physician and library administrator

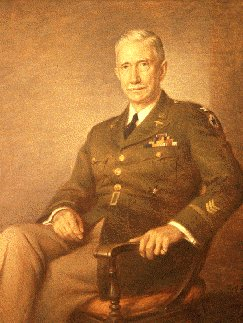
- Colonel Harold W. Jones, M.D.
- Born: November 5, 1877; Cambridge, Massachusetts, U.S.
- Died: April 5, 1958 (aged 80); Orlando, Florida, U.S.
- Occupation(s): Physician and library administrator
- Known for: Director of the Army Medical Library 1936–1944

Colonel Harold W. Jones, M.D. (November 5, 1877 – April 5, 1958), is noted as the Director of the U.S. Army Medical Library from 1936 through 1945, who made signal contributions to military medicine and to the evolution of the United States National Library of Medicine (NLM).

== Medical and military career ==
Harold Wellington Jones was born in Cambridge, Massachusetts, and after attending the Massachusetts Institute of Technology from 1894 to 1897, he enrolled in Harvard Medical School, receiving an M.D. in 1901. After two years as a resident and house physician at the Boston Children's Hospital, he entered the field of orthopedics in St. Louis, Missouri, and worked with Nathaniel Allison, who became one of his best friends. In 1904, Jones was named Associate Professor of Orthopedic Surgery at St. Louis University School of Medicine (renamed the Washington University School of Medicine in 1918). The same year saw his first medical publications, including two articles written in collaboration with Allison.

In September 1905, he decided on an army career and entered the Army Medical School in Washington D.C., whose specialized library he would eventually be asked to direct. In June 1906, he graduated with honors and was commissioned in the Army Medical Corps (MC). Early in his career he served two tours of duty in the Philippines with a small unit operating in Samar and Leyte against native insurgents. In 1916 he was in command of an ambulance train with General John J. Pershing in Mexico. During World War I, Jones commanded the Beau Désert Hospital Center (5 miles from Bordeaux), which had more than 12,500 patients at the war's end.

Jones later taught as a professor in the Army Medical School. He was subsequently (1927–1933) chief of surgery at the station hospital at Fort Sam Houston, Texas, later to become the Brooke Army Medical Center. From 1933 to 1936 he commanded the Tripler Army Medical Center in Honolulu, Hawaii.

In 1936, Colonel Jones was appointed head of the Army Medical Library (AML) in Washington, D.C., now the United States National Library of Medicine (NLM). His tenure would include a critical period in its history. With the outbreak of World War II, appropriations for the Library were increased; the demands for its services trebled and quadrupled within the space of a few months in 1940.

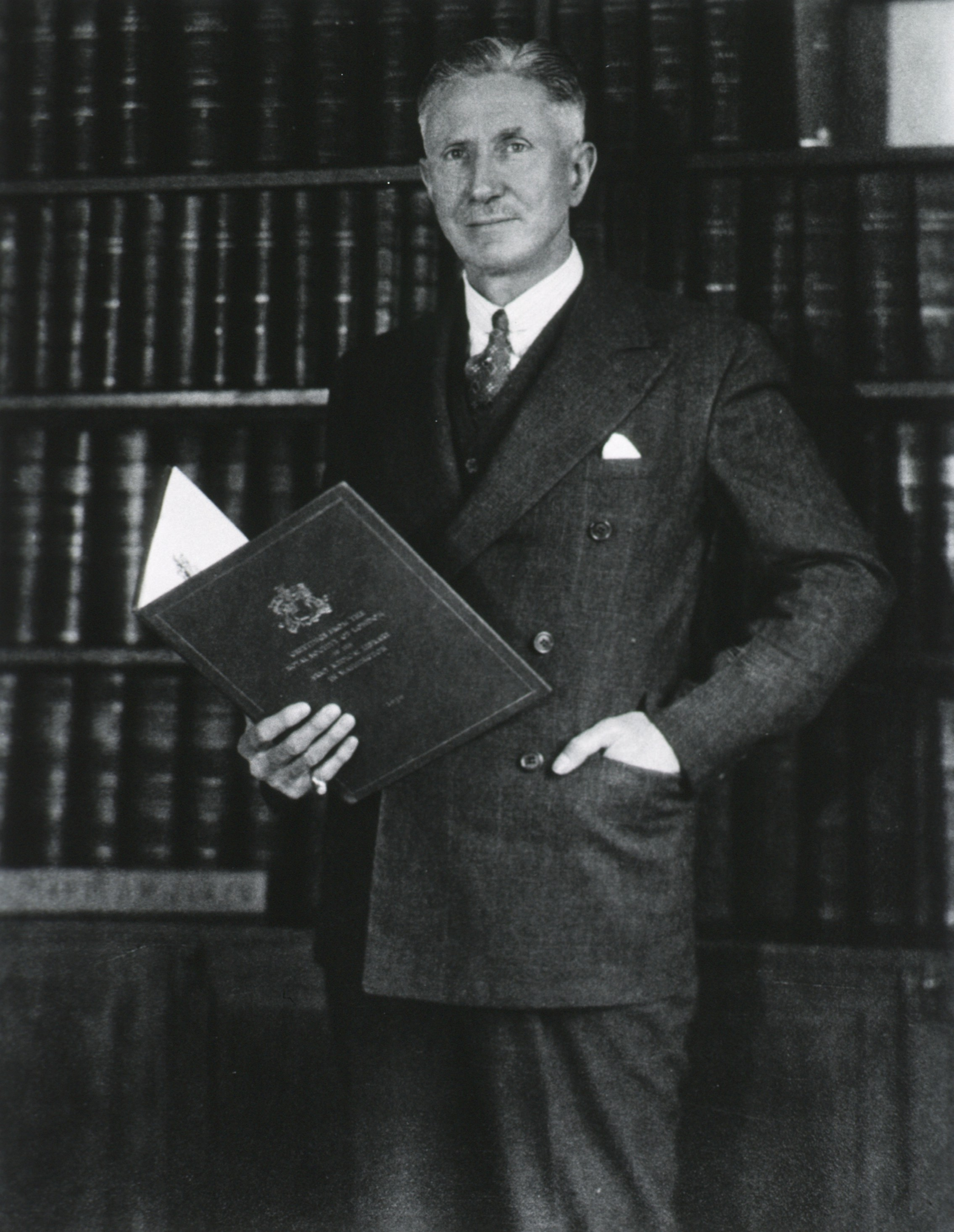
Harold W. Jones

In July 1942, he arranged for the Cleveland Medical Library Association (CMLA), in Ohio, to store some 75 tons worth of the AML’s rare books and incunabula for safekeeping and restoration. The "Cleveland Branch of the Army Medical Library" took over most of the third floor of the CMLA's Allen Memorial Medical Library, where it remained until the early 1960s.

Jones also led an ambitious project there to edit and update the old George M. Gould Medical Dictionary, whose results were published in 1949 as "Blakiston's New Gould Medical Dictionary."

In 1943, Jones commissioned a detailed survey of the Army Medical Library led by Keyes D. Metcalf, then director of Harvard Library, with funding from the Rockefeller Foundation under the auspices of the American Library Association. Completed in 1944, the Survey urgently recommended the construction of a new building, as well as the reorganizing, expansion and updating of the book collections, Library staff and policies, respectively, to reflect current standards in library science. Coordination with the Library of Congress was a separate side-effect of the survey.

With the exception of the new building (not approved until 1958), Jones managed to effect many of the survey's recommendations within a year. During the war years, he also formed a temporary consulting group of top physicians and librarians to advise on the operation and future development of the AML, to significant effect.

Colonel Jones had reached retirement age in November 1941, but was asked by the Surgeon General to remain on wartime duty as Director of the Army Medical Library. Finally, at the height of all these developments, he was compelled to retire at the end of 1945. In a unique twist, he ended his military career in the same building he had entered as a young lieutenant.

Some of his professional correspondence is held at the National Library of Medicine.

== Awards and distinctions ==
In 1918, Jones was decorated in France as a Chevalier of the Legion of Honour and an Officer of the Order of Public Health. He was also decorated by Poland (1939), Romania (1941), and Mexico. In 1937, Jones was Chief U.S. Delegate to the 9th International Congress of Military Medicine (later the International Committee of Military Medicine) in Bucharest, as well as delegate to the Geneva Convention of International Red Cross Societies in The Hague. In 1939, he was Secretary General of the 10th International Congress of Military Medicine. From 1936 to 1946, he was Honorary Curator of the Osler Library in Montreal. In 1945, he received the U. S. Legion of Merit, as well as an honorary Doctor of Laws degree from Western Reserve University. In June 1956, the Medical Library Association (MLA) presented him with an award for his outstanding work as its President (1940 and 1941), Publication Committee chairman (1941–1945), Editor of the Bulletin (now Journal) of the Association (1941–1943), and as its long-time Finance Committee chairman.

== Character, interests, and private life ==
Concurrently with his other work, Colonel Jones wrote many highly regarded publications in military medicine, medical history, and medical librarianship. In addition, second only to his keen interest in medicine and surgery, he also had a great bent for travel and literary pursuits. He was an avid traveler both in Europe and in the interior of Asia and the East Indies. In 1913, he wrote a lengthy manuscript with the working title "Twenty Towns in Spain." He also wrote a number of urbane, humorous essays, first published in early volumes of the Current List of Medical Literature, which he instituted, and later issued as a vanity press volume entitled "Green Fields and Golden Apples," in 1942. Jones dedicated the collection to his late friend and colleague, Nathaniel Allison. In 1945, he wrote a short piece neatly combining many of his interests in "Some Physicians—Real and Fictional—in French Literature," which appeared in the MLA Bulletin.

In illustrating his personality, an adjutant said on meeting him in 1942 "It was easy to like Colonel Jones. He was [then] about 64 and in excellent health...handsome and erect and about six feet, six inches tall. His eyes were merry, mischievous, and bright, and his clipped white moustache made one think of a colonel from Esquire, except that he was not at all heavy for his height."

Jones and his second wife, Mary, (née Mary Winifred Morrisey, m. May 1, 1937) had an attractive home in Silver Spring, Maryland, where they liked to entertain guests, often high-ranking military friends and their wives. (Note: Jones' first marriage was to Eva Ewing Munn on January 1, 1910. She died in 1936.)

Colonel Jones died at his retirement home in Orlando, Florida, on April 5, 1958. He was buried with full military honors in Arlington National Cemetery.

== See also ==
- U.S. Army Medical Department
- Library of the Surgeon General's Office
- United States National Library of Medicine (NLM)
- Washington University School of Medicine
- Medical Library Association (MLA)
