= Marcia Croker Noyes =

Librarian in Maryland, US

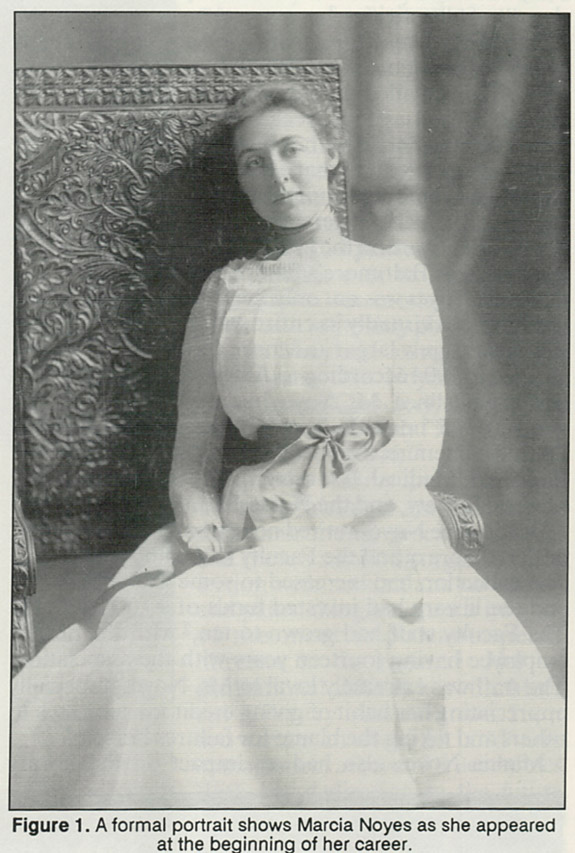
- Noyes in the late 1890s
- Born: December 1869; Saratoga Springs, New York
- Died: November 24, 1946 (aged 76)
- Resting place: Green Mount Cemetery; Baltimore, Maryland, U.S.
- Education: Hunter College
- Occupation: Medical Librarian
- Known for: Medical Librarianship
- Title: President, Medical Library Association
- Term: 1933-1934

Marcia Crocker Noyes (1869–1946) was a librarian at The Maryland State Medical Society from 1896 to 1946, and was a founding and presiding member of the Medical Library Association.

== Early life and education ==
Marcia Crocker Noyes was born in December 1869 in Saratoga Springs, New York. She was the youngest of four children born to Levi and Catherine Noyes. She studied at Hunter College in New York, and considered becoming a dress designer or an artist, despite disapproval from her parents.

== Career ==
Noyes began her career as a librarian after moving to Baltimore, Maryland to live with her sister, Kitty Noyes Marshall. She took a position as a relief worker on a salary of $15 a month at the Enoch Pratt Free Library, led by Dr. Bernard Steiner, where she continued to work for three years. During this time, she was promoted into a supervisory role.

In 1896, Sir William Osler, MD became the President of The Maryland State Medical Society and required an "intelligent, dedicated, full-time medical librarian" to meet the increased demand for medical library services and oversee a steadily growing collection of 7,000 volumes. Because of her work at the Enoch Pratt Free Library, Steiner recommended Noyes for the position, declaring her "a woman of executive talents". Noyes was later selected as the new librarian and received an annual salary of $200.

In her new role as a medical librarian, Noyes learned on the job by attending all faculty functions. She also served as Sir William's understudy and developed a long-lasting friendship with him; she claimed to be "infected with his mission to improve the medical library and by so doing to improve the quality of medical practice".

In her first year, Noyes developed a book classification system for medical books, based on the index medicus, which she called the Classification for Medical Literature. The system uses the alphabet with capital letters for the major divisions of medicine and lower-case ones for the sub-sections. Notes' Classification is still used at the Medical and Chirurgical Library for original historical material, but has not been revised since her death. Friends from the Enoch Pratt Free Library were hired to help catalogue in the evenings at a rate of 25¢ an hour. Due to budgetary constraints, Noyes was only able to hire one full-time assistant, Gustave Orville Caution, during the first ten years of her employment .

In 1904, the library was reorganized, and Noyes assumed the role of secretary. She would not be formally appointed to the position of Executive Secretary until 1925.

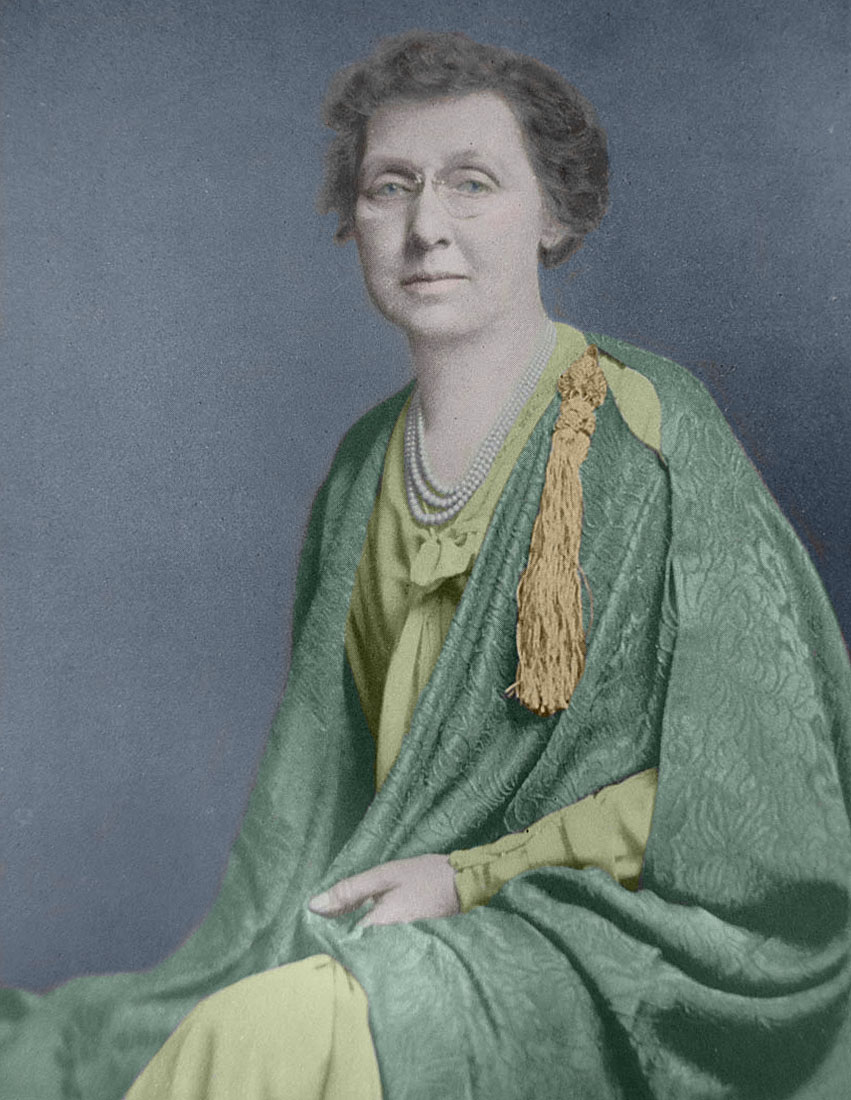
Marcia Crocker Noyes at the midpoint of her career.

Within ten years, the library required a larger building, and plans were spearheaded by Noyes and Osler to build a headquarters building, which would primarily house the library's growing collection of medical books and journals.

=== New headquarters ===
Noyes was instrumental in the design and building of the new headquarters. She traveled to Philadelphia, New York, and Boston to look at their medical society buildings. Eventually the Philadelphia architectural firm Ellicott & Emmart was selected to design and build the new faculty building. The building, whose construction progress Noyes inspected on-site, was built in less than one year at a cost of $90,000.

Among the features of the new building was a fourth-floor apartment created for Noyes to her specifications, including a room for her maid. She moved into her new apartment in 1909, and often referred to it as the first true penthouse in Baltimore, since it had a garden and rooftop terrace. This apartment allowed her to be on 24-hour duty for 50 years.

By the time of her retirement in 1946, the library collection had grown to more than 65,000 volumes from medical and specialty societies around the world. The library was also now financially secure, with invested funds totaling $90,000.

== Medical Library Association ==
Parallel to her career, Noyes was also involved in the Medical Library Association (MLA), as one of eight founding members and later as Association President. On May 2, 1898, the eight charter members gathered in Philadelphia, Pennsylvania to form the MLA, determining the Association's objective to "foster medical libraries and promote the exchange of medical literature."

One of the earliest mandates of the MLA was the Exchange, a distribution and trade service for those who had duplicates or little-used books in their collections. Initially, the Exchange was run out of the Philadelphia Medical Society, but in 1900 it was moved to Baltimore where Noyes oversaw it. In 1904, the Exchange was again moved to the Medical Society of the County of Kings (Brooklyn, New York) due to storage constraints, and in 1908 the MLA asked Noyes to take charge once again. In 1909, when the new Faculty building opened, providing enough room to run the Exchange and with the help of MLA Treasurer, Dr. John Ruhräh.

Additionally, Noyes and Ruhräh worked jointly to revive the Bulletin of the Medical Library Association, which had all but ceased publication in 1908, taking the Exchange with it. This duo maintained editorial control from 1911 until 1926. In 1933, Noyes was elected the first woman and the first non-physician (or the "first unmedicated member") to preside over the Association.

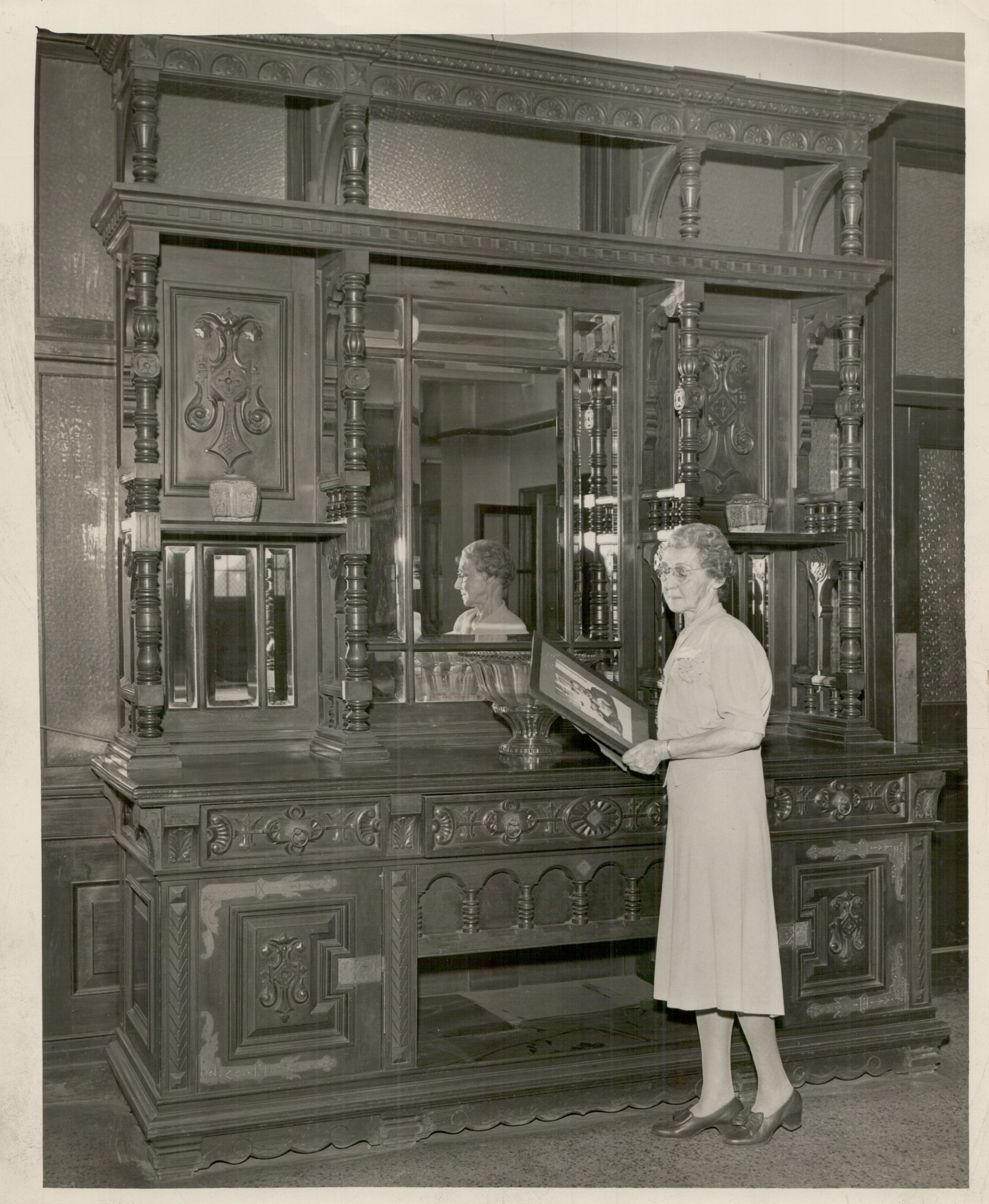
Marcia Crocker Noyes with the Osler sideboard

Noyes wanted to write the history of the MLA once she retired from full-time work at the Faculty, but her health was beginning to fail. She had an increasingly painful back condition that required her to wear a brace and she had suffered a serious burn on her shoulder, possibly from her summers spent running a summer camp, Camp Seyon (Noyes spelled backwards), for young ladies in the Adirondack Mountains.

On April 24, 1946, a reception was planned to honor Noyes's 50 years at the Faculty, despite her request that the physicians wait until November, the actual date of her 50 years. The Faculty went ahead and hosted the reception on the earlier planned date due to her deteriorating health. More than 250 physicians attended the celebration and many speeches were given. She was presented with a suitcase, a sum of money to use for traveling, and her favorite painting, which she had persuaded the Library committee to purchase many years earlier.

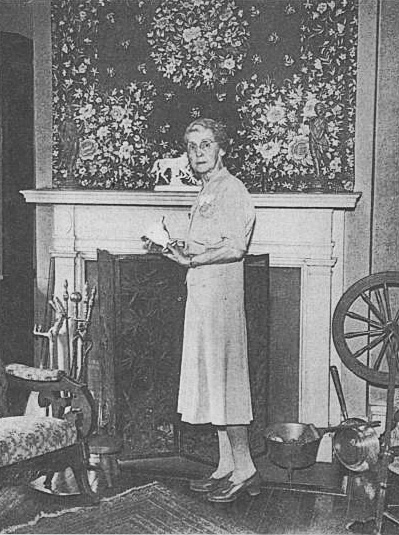
Marcia Crocker Noyes in her apartment at the Faculty building

Noyes died on November 24, 1946,. Her funeral was held by her request in the Faculty's Osler Hall. More than 60 physicians served as her pallbearers, and she was buried at Baltimore's Green Mount Cemetery.

== Legacy ==
In 1947, the MLA established the Marcia C. Noyes Award to honor her contributions to medical librarianship. It is awarded yearly, and presented at the Annual Meeting to a librarian who shows distinguished service and leadership in health sciences librarianship. Awardees receive an engraved sterling silver bowl.
