= Library of the Surgeon General's Office =

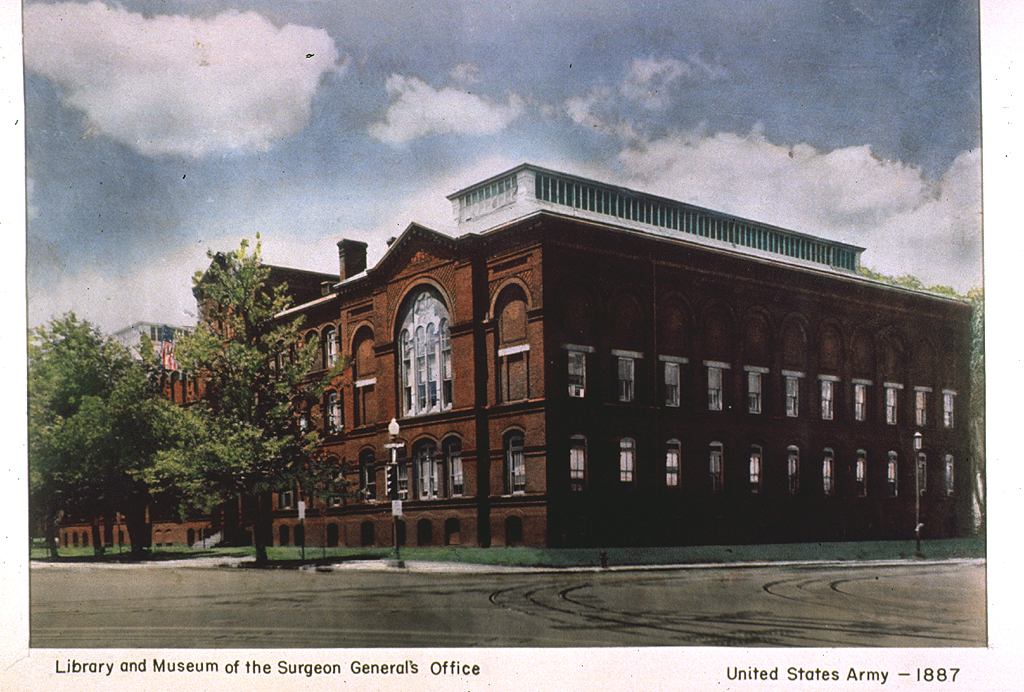
The Army Medical Museum and Library building housed the US Army's medical library from 1887 until 1956. "Old Red", as it was affectionately known, was located on the National Mall in Washington, DC. It was razed in 1969.

The Library of the Surgeon General's Office, later called the Army Medical Library, was the institutional medical literature repository of the U.S. Army Surgeon General from 1836 to 1956 when it was transformed into the National Library of Medicine.

== History ==
=== The 19th century ===
The Library of the Surgeon General's Office was established in 1836 when Joseph Lovell, then Surgeon General, purchased reference books and journals for his office. In 1840 the library published its first list of publications in a manuscript notebook. In 1864, the library printed its first catalog containing 2100 volumes.

In 1867, the Library, along with the new Surgeon General's office, was moved to Ford's Theatre, site of the tragic assassination of President Abraham Lincoln in April 1865. (The theater had been closed and remodelled in the intervening two years.) The new Office/Library site was taken over by the U.S. Army to house a cluster of important post-Civil War medical activities of the Surgeon General's Office. The most significant were the archive of Civil War medical records (essential for verification of veterans' pension claims), the Army Medical Museum (now the National Museum of Health and Medicine), the editorial offices for preparation of the multi-volume Medical and Surgical History of the War of the Rebellion, and the Library of the Surgeon General's Office.

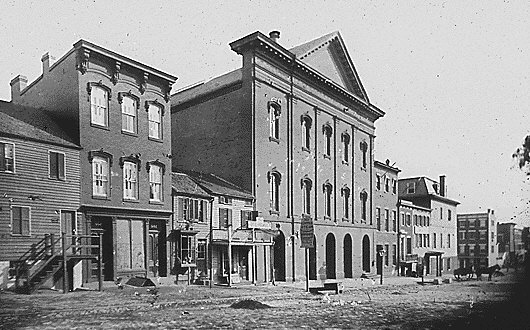
Ford's Theatre housed the Surgeon General's library from 1867 to 1887. (Photo ca. 1870)

The library published its first list of bibliographies in 1869 and in 1871, the decided to develop its collection nationally. The library's goal was to "contain every medical book published in this country and every work relating to public health and state medicine." This collection would be "as complete as possible in all publications relating to military organizations, medicine, and allied sciences." The library strove to provide "an universal library of references". In 1879 the library began publishing Index Medicus, a periodical listing the titles of current medical articles, books, reports, and other medical literature. This achievement, as well as the creation of the Index Catalogue of the Surgeon General's Office (1880), was largely the legacy of Dr. John Shaw Billings, Director of the Library from 1865 to 1895.

When the Army's needs outgrew the capacity of the former theater, several of the units were moved in 1887 to a new building, the Army Medical Museum and Library, on the nearby National Mall (7th Street and South B Street [now Independence Avenue], SW, the present site of the Smithsonian's Hirshhorn Museum).

=== The 20th century ===
From 1920 to 1925, the library was directed by Major General Robert Ernest Noble. In 1922, the library was renamed the "Army Medical Library" (AML). In 1927, using funds from the Carnegie Museums of Pittsburgh, Index Medicus merged with the Quarterly Cumulative Index forming the Quarterly Cumulative Index Medicus. From 1937 until 1942, the library ran a program, "Medicofilm," which provided microfilm access to medical literature to patrons. In 1941 the library published The Current List of Medical Literature a "rapid finding aid" to all current articles and microfilm copies in the library's possession.

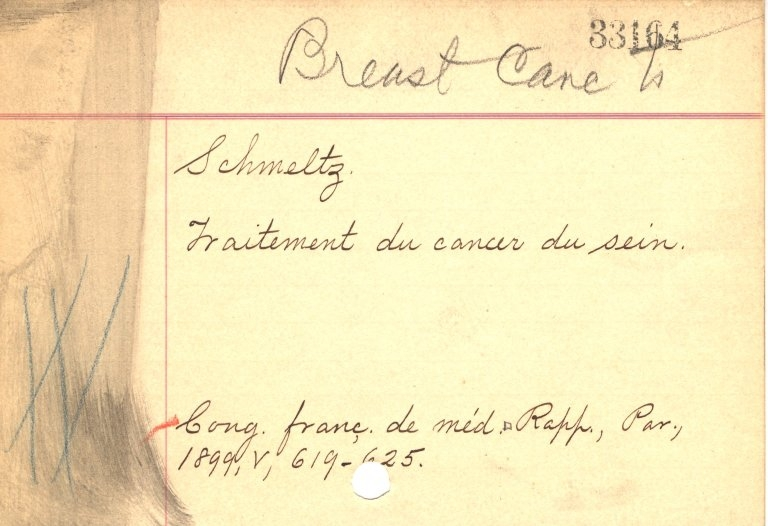
A handwritten subject card from the Library's old card catalog recalls the precomputer days when information had to be created, classified, and sorted by hand. HMD Prints & Photos, PP059772.7.

The AML administration opposed a proposed reorganization and created the Association of Honorary Consultants to the Army Medical Library as a lobbying group to keep the facility within the U.S. Army. Chauncey Leake headed the group and important contributions were made by Michael DeBakey, Joseph McNinch and Harold W. Jones. A transfer to the Public Health Service (PHS) was strongly opposed, with one alternative being incorporation under the Smithsonian Institution. In 1952, the facility was renamed the "Armed Forces Medical Library".

On 13 March 1956, Senators Lister Hill and John F. Kennedy submitted Bill S.3430 to Congress, which promoted "the progress of medicine and advanced national health and welfare by creating the National Library of Medicine". On 3 August 1956 President Dwight D. Eisenhower signed the legislation which transformed the "Armed Forces Medical Library" into the "National Library of Medicine". The Library collection was thus transferred from the control of the United States Department of Defense to that of the PHS of the Department of Health, Education and Welfare.

Several collections of the library's papers are held at the National Library of Medicine.

== See also ==
- National Library of Medicine
- Fielding H. Garrison
- Harold W. Jones
