= Frank Bradway Rogers =

American physician

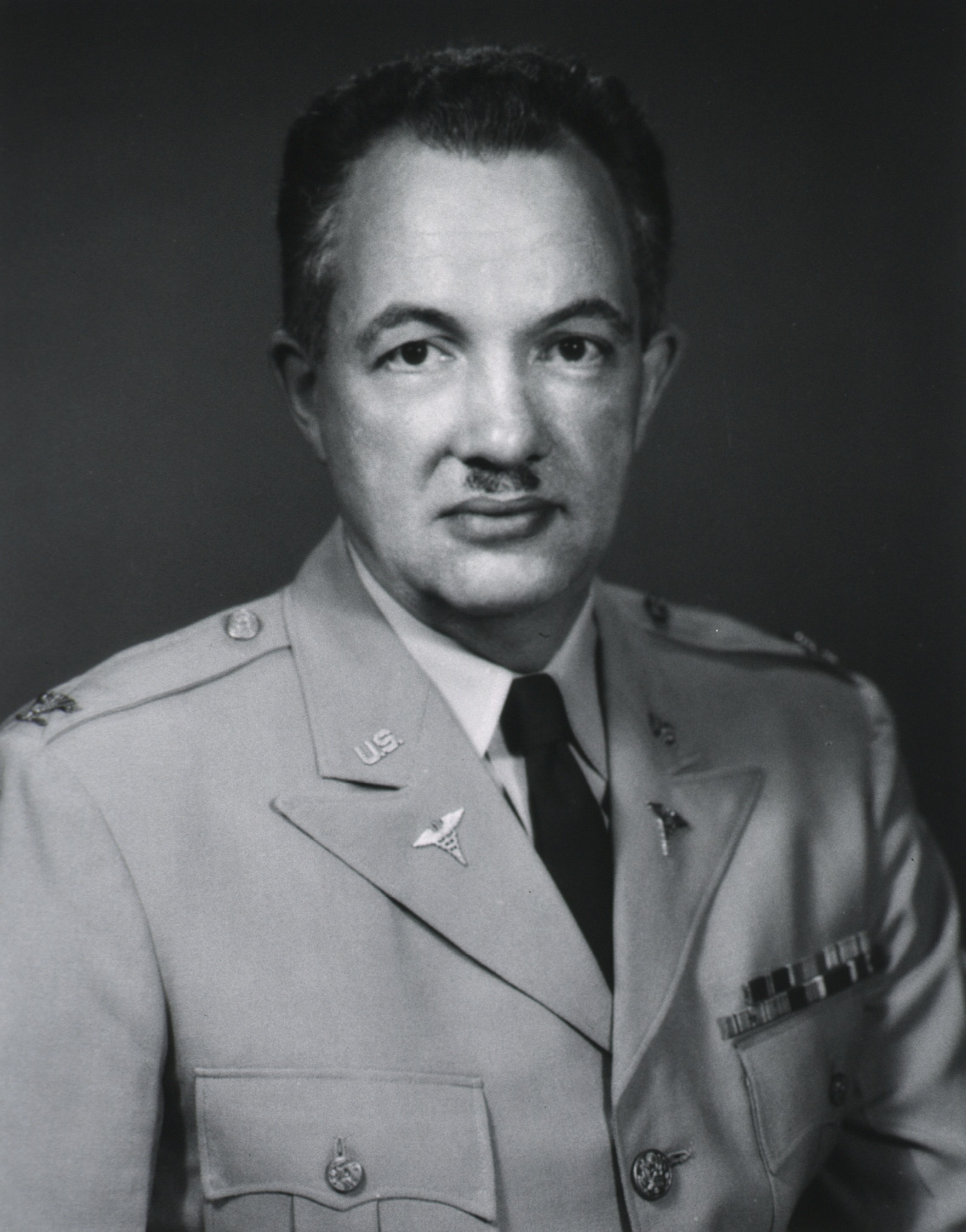
- Born: December 31, 1914; Norwood, Ohio
- Died: July 27, 1987 (aged 72); Denver, Colorado
- Education: Yale University, Ohio State University College of Medicine, Columbia University School of Library Service
- Occupations: Medical Doctor, Librarian
- Known for: MEDLARS, National Medical Library
- Spouse: Barbara Pitt

Frank Bradway Rogers (December 31, 1914 – July 27, 1987) was an American medical doctor and librarian who was instrumental in changing the Army Medical Library into the National Library of Medicine. He helped develop an electronic system of storing and retrieving information called Medical Literature Analysis and Retrieval System (MEDLARS) which replaced the old index cataloging system. American Libraries included Rogers on the list of "100 of the most important people in 20th-century librarianship."

== Early life and education ==
Rogers was born in Norwood, Ohio to Frank Shane and Nettie Bradway Rogers, a postal worker and a homemaker. He grew up in the Cincinnati area with siblings Ralph, Wayne and Eleanor, and attended the schools there. Upon graduation from the Walnut Hills High School in 1932, he was fortunate to acquire a scholarship to attend Yale University as a premed student. He spent four years at Yale, during which time he occupied himself with writing for the newspaper on campus, participating in amateur drama performances and working with the student government. He also worked as a waiter to help sustain him financially.

== Work ==
Newsweek magazine hired him to work as an “office boy” after he graduated with a Bachelor of Arts degree in 1936. After job hopping in several states for about two years, he enrolled at the Ohio State University College of Medicine and obtained a Medical Doctor degree in 1942. During his time at Ohio State, he joined the “Reserved Officer Training Corps.” This was a prelude to joining the Army. He enlisted in the Army with the rank of First Lieutenant, after he finished his medical training. He interned at the Letterman Army Hospital in San Francisco and later trained and taught at the Medical Field Service School in Carlisle Barracks, Pennsylvania.

On June 5, 1942, Rogers married his wife, Barbara Pitt, who was a school teacher. Their union produced three children, Ellen, Peter, and Shane.

From 1945 until 1947, Rogers served as a surgeon in the Philippines and Japan. He returned to the United States in 1947 to an appointed position of “resident in surgery at the Walter Reed Army Hospital in Washington, D.C.”. While working at the Walter Reed Hospital, he stumbled across information about a job opening of Director at the Army Medical Library (AML). This job posting awakened his passion for working with books. Along with several other candidates, Rogers applied for and got the job. He started his new career at the Library on March 1, 1948.

At the time Rogers joined the library, it was facing organizational problems that his predecessor Colonel Joseph H. McNinch was trying to solve. He made several recommendations to the Surgeon General including hiring a “qualified professional librarian” and sending the person to medical school or sending a qualified physician to library school with the person being “exempt from automatic rotation”. Automatic rotation involved an old law that “prohibited regular military officers from staying in Washington for more than four years.”

== Achievements/affiliations ==
In fulfillment of McNinch's recommendation, Rogers attended Columbia University School of Library Service where he attained a master's degree in Library Science in September 1949. On October 21, 1949, he became the Director of AML. He was dedicated to the library. He studied the system and consistently strove to enhance it, as seen in this sentence from his obituary by John Blake. “Rogers went to fundamentals and carried forward the basic reforms in acquisitions and cataloging necessary to undergird more visible advances in bibliographical and other services.” He made many notable contributions, among them was converting the archaic index-cataloging to a “revised Current List of Medical Literature and a new Army Medical Library Catalog”. He assisted in the development of the Current List into a mechanized form, laying the foundation for the Medical Literature Analysis and Retrieval System (MEDLARS) that electronically stored and retrieved information. MEDLARS “provided the medical profession [...] with the most powerful bibliographic tool in the world [....] Its success marked a milestone in the evolution of modern libraries.”

One of Rogers' greatest achievements, according to Charles Moritz (from the Current Biography Yearbook) was the establishment of a legal basis for the Library. A bill to create a national medical library submitted by Senators Lister Hill and John F. Kennedy on March 13, 1956, was passed by Congress. President Eisenhower signed the legislation on August 3, 1956. The goal of the bill was “to promote the progress of medicine and to advance the national health and welfare.” It also included combining the AML, Navy medical libraries, Air Force medical libraries, and the Public Health Service into one system. This new system was named the “National Medical Library” . (NLM). The bill passed and the legislation was signed by President Eisenhower on August 3, 1956. Rogers served as the Director beginning October 1, 1956. He was actively involved in the erection of a new building in Bethesda, Maryland to house the Library.

Rogers was intrigued with computers and technology and was always researching ways to upgrade the institution. He made numerous positive changes that updated the Library. His achievements and innovations did not go unnoticed. He was offered several jobs from organizations like World Health Organization (1958), the United Nations (1959–61), and a number of universities. He received the Marcia C. Noyes Award for outstanding achievement in medical librarianship in 1961, from the Medical Library Association (MLA). He was also awarded the Melvil Dewey Medal from the American Library Association (ALA) in 1963. He was president of the Medical Library Association from 1962 to 1963.

He retired from NLM in 1963 and went to work for the University of Colorado Medical Center. Rogers wrote many articles, reviews, reports, books and among them the book “Selected Papers.” This book was about the life of John Shaw Billings, in celebration of the 125th anniversary of the AML (1965). Rogers wrote that, “Billings was born on April 12, 1838, son of James and Abby Shaw Billings, in Cotton Township, Switzerland County, Indiana. He served as the director of the library during the last years of the nineteenth century. “ He admired Billings and thought that he was one of the best men in the medical field. He remarked that “Billings was a brilliant innovator and a prolific writer, dedicated to the advancement of the Medical Library as an indispensable instrument of the medical profession.”

Rogers was affiliated with many publications including Bulletin of the Medical Library Association, American Medical Association, Libri, Journal of Cataloging and Classification, Military Surgeon, Library Journal, Texas Reports on Biology and Medicine, Medical Arts and Sciences, Journal of Medical Education and History of Science Society. During the years of 1966 to 1968, he was the president of the American Association for the History of Medicine.

== Retirement ==
After retiring in 1974, he indulged in his passion of working with books. He worked with several libraries, binding, repairing and restoring books. He was given the “first MLA award for outstanding contribution in the application of technological to the delivery of health science information, established by the Institute for Scientific Information and subsequently named in his honor” in 1983.

Rogers was well admired and appreciated for his determination, diligence, effectiveness and efficiency that he brought to the job. He died at his home in Denver, Colorado on July 27, 1987.

A collection of his papers is held at the National Library of Medicine in Bethesda, Maryland.
