= Canadian Health Libraries Association =

The Canadian Health Libraries Association or Association des bibliothèques de la santé du Canada was founded in 1976. It represents the views of Canadian health sciences librarians to governments, the health community and fellow librarians.

== Chapters ==
CHLA/ABSC has twelve regional chapters:

- Section Santé et services sociaux de la FMD (3S) (FMD3S)
- Golden Horseshoe Health Libraries Association
- Health Libraries Association of British Columbia
- Manitoba Association of Health Information Providers
- Maritimes Health Libraries Association / Association des bibliothèques de la santé des Maritimes
- Newfoundland and Labrador Health Libraries Association
- Northern Alberta Health Libraries Association
- Ottawa Valley Health Libraries Association / Association des bibliothèques de la santé de la Vallée d'Outaouais
- Saskatchewan Health Libraries Association
- Southern Alberta Health Libraries Association
- Toronto Health Libraries Association
- Wellington-Waterloo-Dufferin Health Library Network

== Conference ==
CHLA/ABSC holds an annual, peer-reviewed conference which rotates among regions in Canada.

== Publications ==
- eNews (2015-present)
- Journal of the Canadian Health Libraries Association (2004–present)
- Bibliotheca Medica Canadiana (1979–2003)
- CHLA/ABSC Newsletter (1977–1979) Nos. 1-8.
