= Medical Library Association =

Nonprofit, educational organization of health-sciences information professionals

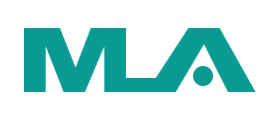
- Medical Library Association Logo
- Formation: 1898
- Type: Non-profit
- Headquarters: Chicago, Illinois
- Members: More than 3,000 individual members and 400 institutions - primarily in US
- Website: www.mlanet.org

The Medical Library Association (MLA) is a nonprofit educational organization based in the United States with more than 3,400 health-sciences information professional members.

== History ==
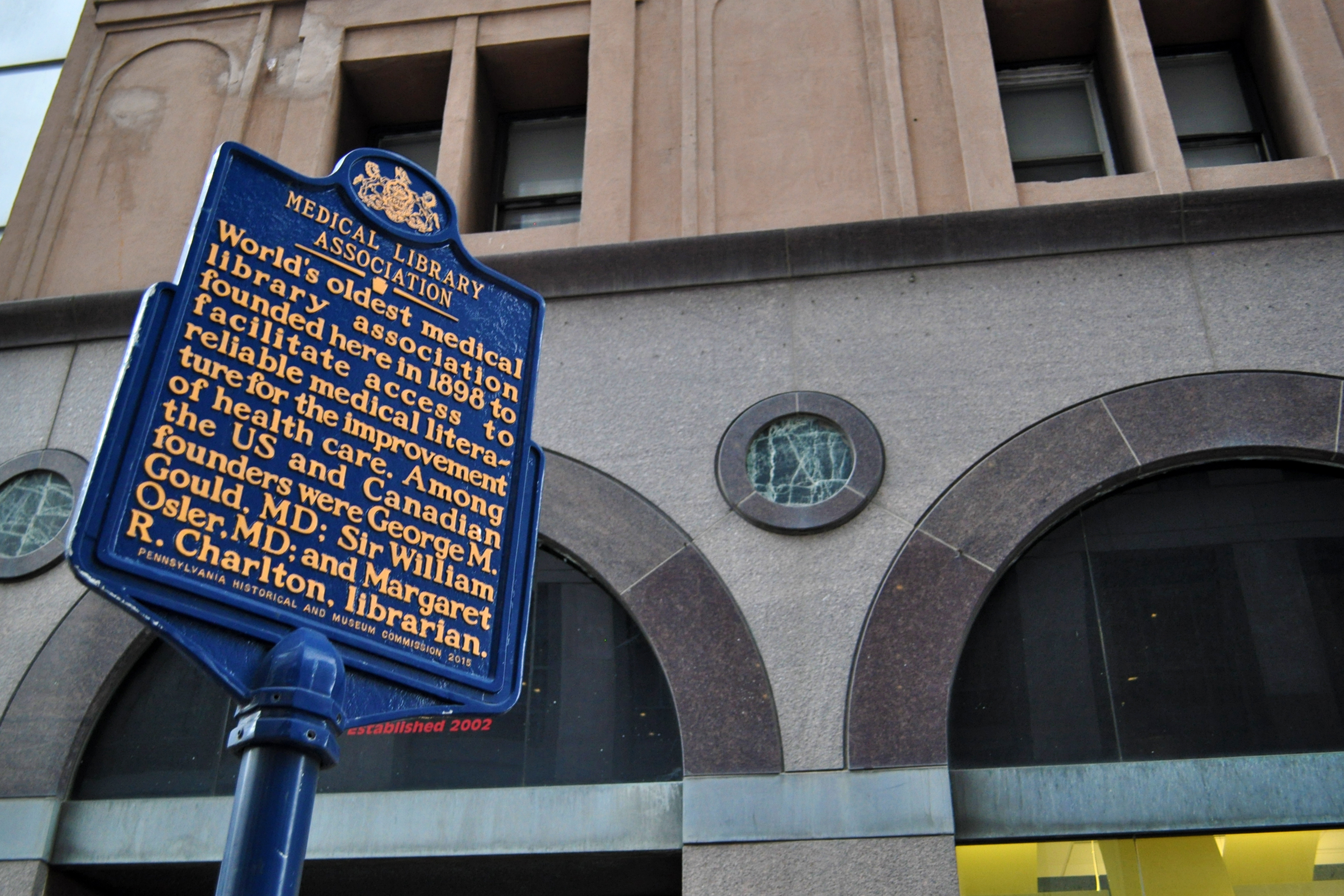
Medical Library Association Historical Marker, 1420 Chestnut St. Philadelphia PA

Founded on May 2, 1898, the Association of Medical Librarians, as it was known until 1907, was founded "to encourage the improvement and increase of public medical libraries." Its charter members included four librarians: Marcia C. Noyes, Margaret R. Charlton, Elizabeth Thies-Meyer, and Charles Perry Fisher, and five physicians: George M. Gould, John L. Rothrock, E. H. Brigham, William Osler and William Browning. MLA is the second oldest special library association in the United States.

The MLA Exchange was one of the founders' earliest and most important projects, helping build medical libraries in the United States and many other countries by exchanging duplicate publications. The organization has subsequently developed a variety of programs to serve the needs of health information specialists.

The National Library of Medicine holds a collection of the organization's archival material that ranges from 1898 to 2002.

== Membership ==
MLA's members comprise more than 400 institutions and 3,000 individuals in the health-sciences information field worldwide, though—as many other countries now have their own national health library organizations—it now primarily represents health sciences libraries and librarians in the United States.

Membership is structured to accommodate varying needs and professional status of a diverse field of practitioners. Categories include Regular Membership, Institutional Membership, International Membership, Affiliate Membership, and Student Membership.

=== Academy of Health Information Professionals ===
The Academy of Health Information Professionals (AHIP) is MLA's peer-reviewed professional development and career recognition program.

Members of the academy are credentialed as health information professionals by demonstrating their academic preparation, professional experience and professional accomplishments. Credentialing differs from certification in that certification focuses on the attainment of minimum standards and measurable competencies, whereas credentialing recognizes the time and effort that is required for professional development. It also differs from licensure because licensure is a legal requirement for professionals in certain professions, such as medicine.

==== History of the Academy ====
MLA established its credentialing program in 1949 and the Academy of Health Information Professionals was established January 1, 1978. The program has been revised subsequently. The most recent action by MLA occurred in April 1995, when the MLA Board of Directors appointed members to the Task Force to Review the Academy of Health Information Professionals. In May 1996, the task force completed its report and recommendations to the MLA Board of Directors, who reviewed the academy in its current form and made recommendations for future goals.

==== AHIP membership Levels ====
There are five levels of membership in AHIP – Provisional, Member, Senior Member, Distinguished Member, and Emeritus Member. Each level is based on earning points for professional activities and a series of professional competencies, which can be found online.

== Governance and structure ==
MLA is governed by a board of directors. The president, president-elect, immediate past president, seven directors elected by the membership at large, and chairs of the Chapter and Caucus councils serve as voting members of the board of directors. The president serves as chair of the board of directors and does not vote except to make or to break a tie. The executive director serves as a nonvoting member of the board of directors.

=== Chapters ===
Twelve geographic groups within the United States are currently affiliated with MLA. These chapters provide a vital link to the programs and services of the association; they are open to both MLA members and non-members.

=== Caucuses ===
Over 40 MLA caucuses represent the varied subfields and areas of specialization of the association's membership. Caucuses share information during the year through email list communication, informal networking, and newsletters. Caucuses sponsor contributed and invited paper sessions at the Annual Meeting. Examples of MLA caucuses include: Cancer Libraries, Consumer and Public Health Information, Hospital Libraries, Medical Informatics, Nursing and Allied Health Resources, Public Health/Health Administration, Research, and Veterinary Medical Libraries.

=== Committees, juries, panels and task forces ===
MLA depends on members with a wide range of skills and expertise to serve on its committees. Committees have varied roles in the association. The word committee includes committees required by the bylaws, committees of the Board of Directors, standing committees, subcommittees, ad hoc committees, juries, panels, and task forces. A description of these various committees is provided below:

- Standing committees are continuing committees with ongoing responsibility for furthering the Medical Library Association's interests, programs, and projects.
- The Executive and Nominating Committees are mandated by the bylaws.
- Juries are constituted for the purpose of recommending recipients of awards, prizes, grants, and scholarships.
- Panels are appointed to serve as peer-review and evaluation boards for MLA's publication and credentialing programs.
- Ad hoc committees are appointed for a special purpose and are discharged when their tasks are completed.
- From time to time, special task forces are appointed for a specific study.

== Activities ==
=== Advocacy ===
Advocacy efforts for librarians and the library profession take many forms within MLA: Resources are provided to help hospital librarians communicate with other leaders in their institutions about the true value of librarians and library services, including Advocacy Toolbox: A Practical Guide to Communicating Your Value. The MLA Governmental Relations Committee is charged with developing consistency in the Association's position on information policy issues, and on governmental actions affecting medical libraries. Legislative updates on topics such as funding for library programs and services; health care reform, and copyright issues are provided. The MLA Vital Pathways Task Force reviews existing data and trends in the status of hospital librarians, collects data on the links between libraries and quality and financial outcomes, and develops action plans to influence hospital decision-makers and key leaders in the health care field.

=== Career development ===
MLA offers career services for health sciences information professionals, students attending library school programs, and those interested in learning more about a career as a medical librarian. MLA offers programs to improve the knowledge and skills of its members and provide continuing education and credentialing to its members.

=== Cunningham fellowship ===
The Cunningham Fellowship is an award for health sciences librarians from countries outside the United States and Canada. The award provides for attendance at the MLA annual meeting and observation and supervised work in one or more medical libraries in the United States or Canada.

=== Publications and website ===
- Journal of the Medical Library Association MLA's quarterly, peer-reviewed scholarly journal. Vols. 113–; Jill T. Boruff and Michelle Kraft co-editors.
- Bulletin of the Medical Library Association Vols. 1–89; 1911–2001
- Biomedical Digital Libraries (2003–2007)
- MLA-FOCUS A bimonthly electronic newsletter for MLA members.
- MLA News A monthly newsletter for members and subscribers that includes news about the profession; articles that impart practical, on-the-job wisdom; and information about MLA products and services.
- Books Books written by medical librarians on subjects of interest to medical librarians and other health information professionals.
- BibKits Selective, annotated bibliographies of discrete subject areas in the health sciences literature.
- DocKits Collections of representative, unedited library documents from a variety of institutions that illustrate the range of approaches to library management.
- The association's website includes information for patients as well as librarians. The Washington Post recommended this site to patients, stating that it can help patients understand medical terminology and find the best sources of information on the Internet, but that the association's website is difficult to navigate.

=== Conferences and meetings ===
Attendees at MLA's annual meeting present and discuss scholarly papers, applied research, and issues in health sciences information management. Professionals with specific interests in related fields such as medical informatics come together to address topics of timely importance. Educational sessions are complemented by an exhibit featuring more than 100 vendors of appropriate products and services. The first MLA annual meeting was in 1898, in Philadelphia, Pennsylvania. The most recent meeting was held in Detroit, Michigan May 16–19, 2023. Since 2020, MLA annual meetings have offered virtual or hybrid participation options for members unable to attend in person.

Future Meetings

- 2026 Milwaukee, WI May 19-22
- 2027 Denver, CO May 25-28

== See also ==
- Janet Doe, former president (1948–1949), editor of the first two editions of Medical Library Practice, honored by annual lecture series
- Margaret Ridley Charlton, the Association's first Secretary
- Gwendolyn S. Cruzat, named one of the 100 most notable medical librarians by MLA in 1998
- Marcia Croker Noyes, one of the founding members of MLA and the first woman, first non-physician president.
- Mildred M. Jordan, former president (1960)
- Mary Louise Marshall, longest-serving MLA president (during World War II).
- Lucretia W. McClure, former president (1990–91)
- Gloria Werner, edited the Association's journal
- List of medical libraries in the United States
