= NIH classification of headaches =

The NIH classification of headaches consists of brief, relatively vague glossary-type definitions of a limited number of headaches.

It outlines five types of headache: vascular, myogenic (muscle tension), cervicogenic, traction, and inflammatory.

== Vascular ==
The most common type of vascular headache is migraine. Migraine headaches are usually characterized by severe pain on one or both sides of the head, an upset stomach, and, for some people, disturbed vision. It is more common in women. While vascular changes are evident during a migraine, the cause of the headache is neurological, not vascular. After migraine, the most common type of vascular headache is the "toxic" headache produced by fever.

Other kinds of vascular headaches include cluster headaches, which are very severe recurrent short lasting headaches, often located through or around either eye and often wake the patients up at the same time every night. Unlike migraines, these headaches are more common in men than in women.

== Muscular/myogenic ==
Muscular (or myogenic) headaches appear to involve the tightening or tensing of facial and neck muscles; they may radiate to the forehead. Tension headache is the most common form of myogenic headache.

== Cervicogenic ==
Cervicogenic headache originates from disorders of the neck, including the anatomical structures innervated by the cervical roots C1–C3. Cervical headache is often precipitated by neck movement and/or sustained awkward head positioning. It is often accompanied by restricted cervical range of motion, ipsilateral neck, shoulder, or arm pain of a rather vague non-radicular nature or, occasionally, arm pain of a radicular nature.

== Traction/inflammatory ==
Traction and inflammatory headaches are symptoms of other disorders, ranging from stroke to sinus infection. Specific types of headaches include:

- Tension headache
- Migraine
- Idiopathic intracranial hypertension (headache with visual symptoms due to raised intracranial pressure)
- Ictal headache
- Cluster headache
- "Brain freeze" (also known as: ice cream headache)
- Thunderclap headache
- Vascular headache
- Toxic headache
- Coital cephalalgia (also known as: sex headache)
- Hemicrania continua
- Rebound headache (also called medication overuse headache, abbreviated MOH)
- Red wine headache
- "Spinal headache" (or: post-dural puncture headaches) after lumbar puncture or related procedure that will lower the intracranial pressure
- Withdrawal (caused by medication or other dependency creating substance removal/cessation)
- Hangover (caused by heavy alcohol consumption)
- New daily persistent headache

A headache may also be a symptom of sinusitis.

Like other types of pain, headaches can serve as warning signals of more serious disorders. This is particularly true for headaches caused by inflammation, including those related to meningitis as well as those resulting from diseases of the sinuses, spine, neck, ears, and teeth.
