= NTI (disambiguation) =

NTI may refer to:

== People ==
- Nti (surname)

== Miscellanea ==
- Network Telephone Interface, alternative term for the network interface device
- NTi Audio, company
- National Telecommuting Institute, non-profit organization dedicated to work-at-home opportunities for primarily the disabled
- New Technology Institute, training venue in the Eastside of Birmingham, England
- Nociceptive trigeminal inhibition tension suppression system, dental mouthguard
- Northwest Territorial Imperative, North American separatist movement
- Nuclear Threat Initiative, non-profit organization working to prevent catastrophic attacks and accidents with weapons of mass destruction
- Nunavut Tunngavik Incorporated, legal representative of the Inuit of Nunavut
- Vector NTI, software package
- NTI, the IATA code for Steenkool Airport, Indonesia
