= Post-concussion syndrome =

Neurological disorder after a concussion

- Other names: Postconcussive syndrome, persisting postconcussive symptoms
- Specialty: Neurology, psychiatry, physical medicine and rehabilitation

Post-concussion syndrome (PCS), also known as persisting postconcussive symptoms, is a set of symptoms that may continue for weeks, months, or years after a concussion. PCS is medically classified as a mild traumatic brain injury (TBI or, more specifically, mTBI). About 35% of people with concussion experience persistent or prolonged symptoms 3 to 6 months after injury. Prolonged concussion is defined as having concussion symptoms for over four weeks following the first accident in youth and for weeks or months in adults.

A diagnosis may be made when symptoms resulting from concussion last for more than three months after the injury. Loss of consciousness is not required for a diagnosis of concussion or post-concussion syndrome. However, it is important that patients find help as soon as they notice lingering symptoms within one month, and especially when they notice their mental health deteriorating, since they are at risk of post-concussion syndrome depression.

Though there is no specific treatment for PCS, symptoms can be improved with medications and physical and behavioral therapy. Education about symptoms and details about expectation of recovery are important. The majority of PCS cases resolve after a period of time.

== Signs and symptoms ==
Concussion can be associated with a wide range of non-specific symptoms after the initial injury: physical, such as headache; cognitive, such as difficulty concentrating; and emotional and behavioral, such as irritability, anxiety, or depression. Many of the symptoms associated with persisting symptoms after concussion are common or may be exacerbated by other disorders, so there is considerable risk of misdiagnosis. Persisting symptoms after concussion are usually defined as symptoms lasting more than 4 weeks after the initial injury.

Headaches that occur after a concussion may feel like migraine headaches or tension-type headaches, with migraine-like headaches the most commonly reported. Most headaches are tension-type headaches (which may be associated with a neck injury with sneezing and swallowing symptoms) that occurred at the same time of the head injury.

=== Physical ===
A common condition after a concussion is headache. While most people have headaches of the same type they experienced before the injury, people with persisting symptoms after concussion often report more frequent or longer-lasting headaches. They may need their migraine medicine twice a day rather than per month. Between 30% and 90% of people treated for PCS report having more frequent headaches and between 8% and 32% still report them a year after the injury.

Dizziness is another common symptom reported in about half of people diagnosed with PCS and is still present in up to a quarter of them a year after the injury. Older people are at especially high risk for dizziness, which can contribute to subsequent injuries and higher rates of mortality due to falls.

About 10% of people with PCS develop sensitivity to light or noise, about 5% experience a decreased sense of taste or smell, and about 14% report blurred vision. People may also have double vision or ringing in the ears, also called tinnitus. PCS may cause insomnia, fatigue, or other problems with sleep.

=== Psychological and behavioral ===
Psychological conditions, which are present in about half of people with PCS, may include irritability, anxiety, depression, and a change in personality. Other emotional and behavioral symptoms include restlessness, aggression, and mood swings. Some common symptoms, such as apathy, insomnia, irritability, or lack of motivation, may result from other co-occurring conditions, such as depression.

=== Higher mental functions ===
Common symptoms associated with a diagnosis of PCS are related to cognition, attention, and memory, especially short-term memory, which can also worsen other problems such as forgetting appointments or difficulties at work. In one study, one in four people diagnosed with PCS continued to report memory problems a year after the injury, but most experts agree that cognitive symptoms clear within six months to a year after injury in the vast majority of individuals.

== Causes ==
Some people have an increased risk of experiencing persisting symptoms after concussion, however, it is not fully understood what causes symptoms to persist, or why some people who have a mild traumatic brain injury later develop PCS while others do not. The majority of experts believe that PCS results from a mix of factors, including preexisting psychological factors and those directly relating to the physical injury. Certain risk factors have been identified; for example, preexisting medical or psychological conditions, expectations of disability, being female, and older age all increase the chances that someone will experience persisting symptoms after a concussion.

The nature of the syndrome/symptoms and the diagnosis itself have been the subject of intense debate since the 19th century. Some experts believe post-concussion symptoms are caused by structural damage to the brain or disruption of neurotransmitter systems, resulting from the impact that caused the concussion. Others believe that post-concussion symptoms are related to common psychological factors. Most common symptoms like headache, dizziness, and sleep problems are similar to those often experienced by individuals diagnosed with depression, anxiety, or post traumatic stress disorder. In many cases, both physiological effects of brain trauma and emotional reactions to these events play a role in the development of symptoms.

=== Physiological ===
Conventional neuroimaging studies of the brain following a concussion are typically normal. However, studies have found some subtle physiological changes associated with PCS using more novel imaging modalities. Studies using positron emission tomography have linked PCS to a reduction in glucose use by the brain. Changes in cerebral blood flow have also been observed as long as three years after a concussion in studies using single photon emission computed tomography (SPECT). At least one study with functional magnetic resonance imaging (fMRI) has shown differences in brain function during tasks involving memory after mild traumatic brain injury (mTBI) although they were not examining PCS specifically.

Not all people with PCS have abnormalities on imaging, however, and abnormalities found in studies such as fMRI, PET, and SPECT could result from other comorbid conditions such as depression, chronic pain, or posttraumatic stress disorder (PTSD). Proponents of the view that PCS has a physiological basis point to findings that children demonstrate deficits on standardized tests of cognitive function following a mild TBI. A few studies have shown that people with PCS score lower than controls on neuropsychological tests that measure attention, verbal learning, reasoning, and information processing, but issues related to effort and secondary gain can not be ruled out as contributing to these differences. Recovery as measured by scores on cognitive tests frequently do not correlate with resolution of symptoms; individuals diagnosed with PCS may still report subjective symptoms after their performance on tests of cognitive functioning have returned to normal. Another study found that although children with PCS had poorer scores on tests of cognitive functioning after the injury, they also had poorer behavioral adjustment before the injury than children with no persistent symptoms; these findings support the idea that PCS may result from a combination of factors such as brain dysfunction resulting from head injury and preexisting psychological or social problems. Different symptoms may be predicted by different factors; for example, one study found that cognitive and physical symptoms were not predicted by the manner in which parents and family members coped with the injury and adjusted to its effects, but psychological and behavioral symptoms were.

Brain inflammation is suggested to play a role in post-concussive syndrome.

=== Psychological ===
It has been argued that psychological factors play an important role in the presence of post-concussion symptoms. The development of PCS may be due to a combination of factors such as adjustment to effects of the injury, preexisting vulnerabilities, and brain dysfunction. Setbacks related to the injury, for example problems at work or with physical or social functioning, may act as stressors that interact with preexisting factors such as personality and mental conditions to cause and perpetuate PCS. In one study, levels of daily stress were found to be correlated to PCS symptoms in both concussed subjects and controls, but in another, stress was not significantly related to symptoms.

Iatrogenic effects (those caused by the medical intervention) may also occur when individuals are provided with misleading or incorrect information related to recovery of symptoms. This information may cause people to focus and dwell on the idea that their brains are permanently damaged. It appears that even the expectation of symptoms may contribute to the development of PCS by causing individuals with mTBI to focus on symptoms and therefore perceive them to be more intense, to attribute symptoms that occur for other reasons to the injury, and to underestimate the rate of symptoms before the injury.

== Diagnosis ==
Symptom	ICD-10	DSM-IV
Headache	check	check
Dizziness	check	check
Fatigue	check	check
Irritability	check	check
Sleep problems	check	check
Concentration problems	check	-
Memory problems	check	-
Problems tolerating stress/emotion/alcohol	check	-
Affect changes, anxiety, or depression	-	check
Changes in personality	-	check
Apathy	-	check

The International Statistical Classification of Diseases and Related Health Problems (ICD-10) and the American Psychiatric Association's Diagnostic and Statistical Manual of Mental Disorders have set out criteria for post-concussion syndrome (PCS) and post-concussional disorder (PCD), respectively.

The ICD-10 established a set of diagnostic criteria for PCS in 1992. In order to meet these criteria, a patient has had a head injury "usually sufficiently severe to result in loss of consciousness" and then develop at least three of the eight symptoms marked with a check mark in the table at right under "ICD-10" within four weeks. About 38% of people who have a head injury with symptoms of concussion and no radiological evidence of brain lesions meet these criteria. In addition to these symptoms, people that meet the ICD-10 criteria for PCS may fear that they will have permanent brain damage, which may worsen the original symptoms. Preoccupation with the injury may be accompanied by the assumption of a "sick role" and hypochondriasis. The criteria focus on subjective symptoms and mention that neuropsychological evidence of significant impairment is not present. With their focus on psychological factors, the ICD-10 criteria support the idea that the cause of PCS is functional. Like the ICD-10, the ICD-9-CM defines PCS in terms of subjective symptoms and discusses the greater frequency of PCS in people with histories of mental disorders or a financial incentive for a diagnosis.

The DSM-IV lists criteria for diagnosis of PCD in people who have had a head trauma with persistent post-traumatic amnesia, loss of consciousness, or post-traumatic seizures. In addition, for a diagnosis of PCD, patients must have neuropsychological impairment as well as at least three of the symptoms marked with a check mark in the table at right under "DSM-IV". These symptoms must be present for three months after the injury and must have been absent or less severe before the injury. In addition, the patient must experience social problems as a result, and must not meet criteria for another disorder that explains the symptoms better.

Neuropsychological tests exist to measure deficits in cognitive functioning that can result from PCS. The Stroop Color Test and the 2&7 Processing Speed Test (which both detect deficits in speed of mental processing) can predict the development of cognitive problems from PCS. A test called the Rivermead Postconcussion Symptoms Questionnaire, a set of questions that measure the severity of 16 different post-concussion symptoms, can be self-administered or administered by an interviewer. Other tests that can predict the development of PCS include the Hopkins Verbal Learning A test (HVLA) and the Digit Span Forward examination. The HVLA tests verbal learning and memory by presenting a series of words and assigning points based on the number recalled, and digit span measures attention efficiency by asking the examinee to repeat back digits spoken by the tester in the same order as they are presented. In addition, neuropsychological tests may be performed to detect malingering (exaggerating or making up symptoms).

=== Differential diagnosis ===
PCS, which shares symptoms with a variety of other conditions, is highly likely to be misdiagnosed in people with these conditions. Cognitive and affective symptoms that occur following a traumatic injury may be attributed to mTBI, but in fact be due to another factor such as posttraumatic stress disorder, which is easily misdiagnosed as PCS and vice versa. Affective disorders such as depression have some symptoms that can mimic those of PCS and lead to a wrongful diagnosis of the latter; these include problems with concentration, emotional lability, anxiety, and sleep problems. Depression, which is highly common in persistent PCS, can worsen other PCS symptoms, such as headaches and problems with concentration, memory, and sleep. PCS also shares symptoms with chronic fatigue syndrome, fibromyalgia, and exposure to certain toxins. Traumatic brain injury may cause damage to the hypothalamus or the pituitary gland, and deficiencies of pituitary hormones (hypopituitarism) can cause similar symptoms to post-concussion syndrome; in these cases, symptoms can be treated by replacing any hormones that are deficient.

== Treatment ==
Management of post-concussion syndrome typically involves treatments addressing specific symptoms; for example, people can take over the counter pain relievers for headaches and medicine to relieve depression or insomnia. Participation in low-risk physical activities that raise the heart rate and mental activities is advised, at a level that does not worsen symptoms. Prolonged rest is not suggested. Physical and behavioral therapy may also be prescribed for problems such as loss of balance and difficulties with attention, respectively.

=== Medication ===
Though no pharmacological treatments exist for PCS, doctors may prescribe medications used for symptoms that also occur in other conditions; for example, antidepressants are used for the depression that frequently follows mTBI. Side effects of medications may affect people with mTBI more severely than they do others, and thus it is recommended that medications be avoided if possible; there may be a benefit to avoiding narcotic medications. In addition, some pain medications prescribed for headaches can cause rebound headaches when they are discontinued.

=== Psychotherapy ===
Psychological treatment, to which about 40% of PCS patients are referred for consultation, has been shown to reduce problems. Ongoing disabilities may be treated with therapy to improve function at work, or in social or other contexts. Therapy aims to aid in the gradual return to work and other preinjury activities, as symptoms permit. A protocol for PCS treatment has been designed based on the principles behind cognitive behavioral therapy (CBT), a psychotherapy aimed at influencing disturbed emotions by improving thoughts and behaviors. CBT may help prevent persistence of iatrogenic symptoms– those that occur because health care providers create the expectation that they will. A risk exists that the power of suggestion may worsen symptoms and cause long-term disabilities; therefore, when counseling is indicated, the therapist must take a psychological origin of symptoms into account and not assume that all symptoms are a direct result of neurological damage from the injury.

In situations such as motor vehicle accidents or following a violent attack, the post-concussion syndrome may be accompanied by posttraumatic stress disorder, which is important to recognize and treat in its own right. People with PTSD, depression, and anxiety can be treated with medication and psychotherapy.

=== Physical therapy ===
Concussion protocols are continuously changing, with the common recommendation remaining both physical and cognitive rest. Exercise should be implemented as soon as possible after the initial rest period as this lowers the risk of post concussion syndrome (PCS) and overall symptoms. Moderate intensity aerobic exercise will provide therapeutic benefits and reintroduce the body to movement. Patients should begin with 20 minutes of brisk walking or an exercise bike set with mild resistance. If this exacerbates any symptoms, like headache or dizziness, the individual should stop exercising and try again the following day.

=== Education ===
Education about symptoms and their usual time course is a part of psychological therapy, and is most effective when provided soon after the injury. Since stress exacerbates post-concussion symptoms, and vice versa, an important part of treatment is reassurance that PCS symptoms are normal, and education about how to deal with impairments. One study found that PCS patients who were coached to return to activities gradually, told what symptoms to expect, and trained how to manage them had a reduction in symptoms compared to a control group of uninjured people. Early education has been found to reduce symptoms in children as well. Post concussion patients will benefit most from a multidisciplinary approach. Education is crucial for concussion patients to stress the importance of being active by engaging in light aerobic exercise, improving sleep habits and reducing stressors as much as possible. Additional treatments include manual therapy, like massage, and deep neck flexor retraining. Interventions should target specific muscular deficits, which commonly include weakness in the rhomboids, mid and lower trapezius and neck flexor muscles

=== Neurotherapy ===
Neurotherapy is an operant conditioning test where patients are given conditional audio/visual rewards after producing particular types of brainwave activity. Recent neurotherapy improvements in quantitative electroencephalography can identify the specific brainwave patterns that need to be corrected. Studies have shown that neurotherapy is effective in the treatment of post-concussion syndrome and other disorders with similar symptoms. Transcranial low-frequency pulsating electromagnetic fields (T-PEMF) has shown some positive results in treating PCS patients. The tolerability was assessed in a 2020 study, which resulted in 61% of patients reporting decreased symptoms based on the Rivermead Post-Concussion Symptoms Questionnaire.

=== Multimodal ===
Multimodal physical therapy has been shown to improve PCS symptoms. The therapy is most effective when it is symptom-specific. Dizziness and unsteady gait were treated with exercises such as gaze stabilization and static and dynamic balance exercises. Decreased range of motion and cervical instability (known specifically as cervicogenic PCS) are best treated with cervical soft tissue and joint mobilization, deep cervical flexor strengthening exercises and stretching. Symptoms indicative of physiologic PCS (symptoms exacerbated by cardiovascular exercise) seem to improve with light cardio exercises like walking and using a stationary bike while the PT carefully monitors HR. Overall, a patient-specific PT plan of care has proven significantly effective in reducing PCS symptoms.

== Prognosis ==
The prognosis for PCS is generally considered positive, with total resolution of symptoms in many, but not all, cases. For 50% of people, post-concussion symptoms go away within a few days to several weeks after the original injury occurs. In others, symptoms may remain for three to six months, but evidence indicates that many cases are completely resolved within six months. The majority of symptoms are largely gone in about half of people with concussion one month after the injury, and about two thirds of people with minor head trauma are nearly symptom-free within three months. Persistent, often severe headaches are the longest lingering symptom in most cases and are the most likely symptom to never fully resolve. It is frequently stated in the literature and considered to be common knowledge that 15–30% of people with PCS have not recovered by a year after the injury, but this estimate is imprecise because it is based on studies of people admitted to a hospital, the methodologies of which have been criticized. In approximately 15% of people, symptoms may persist for years or be permanent. If symptoms are not resolved by one year, they are likely to be permanent, though improvements may occur after even two or three years, or may suddenly occur after a long time without much improvement. Older people and those who have previously had another head injury are likely to take longer to recover.

The way in which children cope with the injury after it occurs may have more of an impact than factors that existed prior to the injury. Children's mechanisms for dealing with their injuries may have an effect on the duration of symptoms, and parents who do not deal effectively with anxiety about children's post-injury functioning may be less able to help their children recover.

If another blow to the head occurs after a concussion but before its symptoms have gone away, there is a slight risk of developing the serious second-impact syndrome (SIS). In SIS, the brain rapidly swells, greatly increasing intracranial pressure. People who have repeated mild head injuries over a prolonged period, such as boxers and Gridiron football players, are at risk for chronic traumatic encephalopathy (or the related variant dementia pugilistica), a severe, chronic disorder involving a decline in mental and physical abilities.

== Epidemiology ==
It is not known exactly how common PCS is. Estimates of the prevalence at three months post-injury are between 24 and 84%, a variation possibly caused by different populations or study methodologies. The estimated incidence of PPCS (persistent postconcussive syndrome) is around 10% of mTBI cases. Since PCS by definition only exists in people who have had a head injury, demographics and risk factors are similar to those for head injury; for example, young adults are at higher risk than others for receiving head injury, and, consequently, of developing PCS.

The existence of PCS in children is controversial. It is possible that children's brains have enough plasticity that they are not affected by long-term consequences of concussion (though such consequences are known to result from moderate and severe head trauma). On the other hand, children's brains may be more vulnerable to the injury, since they are still developing and have fewer skills that can compensate for deficits. Clinical research has found higher rates of post-concussion symptoms in children with TBI than in those with injuries to other parts of the body, and that the symptoms are more common in anxious children. Symptoms in children are similar to those in adults, but children exhibit fewer of them. Evidence from clinical studies found that high school-aged athletes had slower recoveries from concussion as measured by neuropsychological tests than college-aged ones and adults. PCS is rare in young children.

=== Risk factors ===
A wide range of factors have been identified as being predictive of PCS, including low socioeconomic status, previous mTBI, a serious associated injury, headaches, an ongoing court case, age and female sex. Being older than 40 and being female have also been identified as being predictive of a diagnosis of PCS, and women tend to report more severe symptoms. PCS symptoms are linked to fluctuations in menstrual hormones at time of concussion: specifically the drop of elevated progesterone during the luteal phase is associated with worse outcomes. In addition, the development of PCS can be predicted by having a history of alcohol use disorder, low cognitive abilities before the injury, a personality disorder, or a medical illness not related to the injury. PCS is also more prevalent in people with a history of psychiatric conditions such as clinical depression or anxiety before the injury.

Mild brain injury-related factors that increase the risk for persisting post-concussion symptoms include an injury associated with acute headache, dizziness, or nausea; an acute Glasgow Coma Score of 13 or 14; and having another head injury before recovering from the first. The risk for developing PCS also appears to be increased in people who have traumatic memories of the injury or expect to be disabled by the injury.

== History ==
The symptoms that occur after a concussion have been described in various reports and writings for hundreds of years. The idea that this set of symptoms forms a distinct entity began to attain greater recognition in the latter part of the 19th century. John Erichsen, a surgeon from London, played an important role in developing the study of PCS. The controversy surrounding the cause of PCS began in 1866 when Erichsen published a paper about persisting symptoms after sustaining mild head trauma. He suggested that the condition was due to "molecular disarrangement" to the spine. The condition was originally called "railroad spine" because most of the injuries studied had happened to railroad workers. While some of his contemporaries agreed that the syndrome had an organic basis, others attributed the symptoms to psychological factors or to outright feigning. In 1879, the idea that a physical problem was responsible for the symptoms was challenged by Rigler, who suggested that the cause of the persisting symptoms was actually "compensation neurosis": the railroad's practice of compensating workers who had been injured was bringing about the complaints. Later, the idea that hysteria was responsible for the symptoms after a mild head injury was suggested by Charcot. Controversy about the syndrome continued through the 20th century. During World War I many soldiers with puzzling symptoms after being close to a detonation but without any evidence of a head wound. The illness was called shell shock, and a psychological explanation was eventually favoured. By 1934 the current concept of PCS had replaced ideas of hysteria as the cause of post-concussion symptoms. British authorities banned the term shell shock during World War II to avoid an epidemic of cases, and the term posttrauma concussion state was coined in 1939 to describe "disturbance of consciousness with no immediate or obvious pathologic change in the brain". The term postconcussion syndrome was in use by 1941.

In 1961, H. Miller first used the term "accident neurosis" to refer to the syndrome which is now called PCS and asserted that the condition only occurs in situations where people stand to be compensated for the injury. The real causes of the condition remain unclear.

== Controversy ==
Though no universally accepted definition of postconcussive syndrome exists, most of the literature defines the syndrome as the development of at least three of the following symptoms: headache, dizziness, fatigue, irritability, impaired memory and concentration, insomnia, and lowered tolerance for noise and light. One complication in diagnosis is that symptoms of PCS also occur in people who have no history of head injury, but who have other medical and psychological complaints. In one study 64% of people with TBI, 11% of those with brain injuries, and 7% of those with other injuries met the DSM-IV criteria for post-concussion syndrome. Many of these individuals with PCS were misdiagnosed as having other unrelated conditions due to commonality of symptoms. (see diagnosis above).

Headache is one of the criteria for PCS, but it is notably undetermined where the headache comes from. Couch, Lipton, Stewart and Scher (2007) argue that headaches, one of the hallmarks of PCS, occur in a variety of injuries to the head and neck. Further, Lew et al. (2006) reviewed ample studies comparing headaches to post-traumatic headaches and found that there is wide heterogeneity in the source and causes of headaches. They point out that the International Headache Society lists 14 known causes of headaches, as well. Furthermore, the headaches may be better accounted for by mechanical causes, such as whiplash, which is often mistaken for PCS. An additional possibility is that posttraumatic stress disorder can account for some cases diagnosed as PCS, but for emotional regulation as well.

Depression, posttraumatic stress disorder, and chronic pain share symptoms resembling those of PCS. One study found that while people with chronic pain without TBI do report many symptoms similar to those of post-concussion syndrome, they report fewer symptoms related to memory, slowed thinking, and sensitivity to noise and light than people with mTBI do. Additionally, it has been found that neuroendocrinology may account for depressive symptoms and stress management due to irregularities in cortisol regulation, and thyroid hormone regulation. Lastly, there is evidence that major depression following TBI is quite common, but may be better accounted for with a diagnosis of dysexecutive syndrome.

In a syndrome, a set of symptoms is consistently present, and symptoms are linked such that the presence of one symptom suggests that of others. Because PCS symptoms are so varied and many can be associated with a large number of other conditions, doubt exists about whether the term "syndrome" is appropriate for the constellation of symptoms found after concussion. The fact that the persistence of one symptom is not necessarily linked to that of another has similarly led to doubt about whether "syndrome" is the appropriate term.

A longstanding controversy surrounding PCS concerns the nature of its etiology – that is, the cause behind it – and the degree to which psychological factors and organic factors involving brain dysfunction are responsible. The debate has been referred to as 'psychogenesis versus physiogenesis' (psychogenesis referring to a psychological origin for the condition, physiogenesis to a physical one).

== See also ==
- Daniel Amen, post-concussion expert for the National Football League
