= Butalbital/acetaminophen =

Combination medication

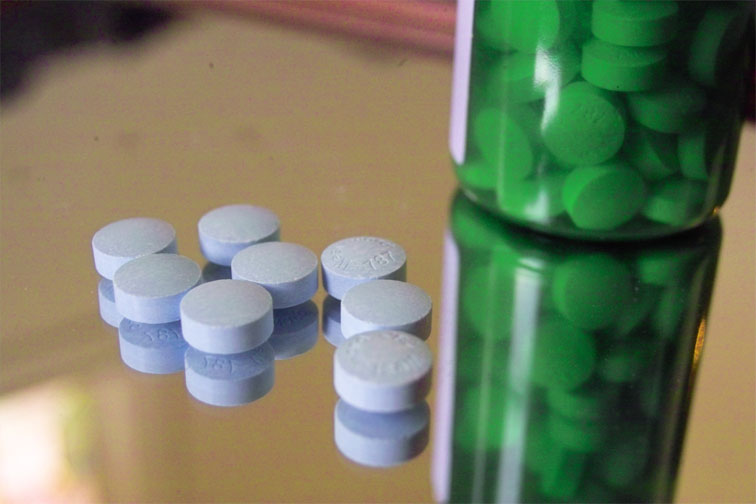

Combination of
- Butalbital: Barbiturate
- Acetaminophen: Miscellaneous analgesic

Clinical data
- Trade names: Allzital, Butapap, Tencon, others
- AHFS/Drugs.com: Professional Drug Facts
- License data: US DailyMed: Butalbital and acetaminophen
- Routes of administration: By mouth
- ATC code: N02BE71 (WHO)

Legal status
- Legal status: US: ℞-only

Identifiers
- CAS Number: 624746-94-7
- ChemSpider: none
- KEGG: D11561

Butalbital/acetaminophen/caffeine
Combination of
- Butalbital: Barbiturate
- Acetaminophen: Miscellaneous analgesic
- Caffeine: Xanthine

Clinical data
- Trade names: Anoquan, Fioricet, Triad, others
- AHFS/Drugs.com: Professional Drug Facts
- MedlinePlus: a601009
- License data: US DailyMed: Butalbital, acetaminophen, and caffeine
- Routes of administration: By mouth
- ATC code: None

Legal status
- Legal status: US: ℞-only

Identifiers
- CAS Number: 122018-95-5
- ChemSpider: none
- KEGG: D11850

Butalbital/acetaminophen, sold under the brand name Butapap among others, is a combination medication used to treat tension headaches and migraine headaches. It contains butalbital, a barbiturate and paracetamol (acetaminophen), an analgesic. Versions also containing caffeine are sold under the brand name Fioricet among others. It is taken by mouth. The combination is also sold with codeine.

The most common side effects include sleepiness, dizziness, trouble breathing, and abdominal pain. Other severe side effects may include liver problems, confusion, addiction, and allergic reactions. Frequent use may result in medication overuse headache. Barbiturate withdrawal may occur if rapidly stopped following long term use. Use is not generally recommended during pregnancy or breastfeeding.

The combination was approved for medical use in the United States in 1984. It is available as a generic medication. In the United States it is a schedule III controlled substance in some states but not federally. It is banned in a number of European countries.

In 2023, the combination butalbital/acetaminophen/caffeine was the 262nd most commonly prescribed medication in the United States, with more than 1 million prescriptions.

== Medical uses ==
Butalbital/acetaminophen is indicated for the treatment of tension headaches.

Butalbital/acetaminophen/caffeine is indicated for the treatment of tension headaches.

== Side effects ==
Prolonged use can cause rebound headaches.

Rarely, use of barbiturates can lead to Stevens–Johnson syndrome.

== Mechanism of action ==
Butalbital has a half-life of about 35 hours. Acetaminophen has a half-life of about 1.25 to 3 hours, but may be increased by liver damage and after an overdose. Caffeine has a half-life of about 2.5 to 4.5 hours.
