= Mixed tension migraine =

Medical condition

Mixed tension migraines are also known as mixed migraines or mixed headaches. They combine characteristics of tension headaches and migraines.

A person may be thought to have mixed headaches when, in addition to experiencing muscle tension headaches, they begin to experience migraine symptoms as well, such as light sensitivity triggering an attack.

A person may also be thought to have this condition when they already experience migraines and then begin to experience chronic daily muscle tension headaches in addition to migraines.

Mixed tension migraines are classified as primary headaches and can be either episodic and chronic, or daily.

Mixed tension migraines are commonly managed by medication and avoiding activities which may trigger the headaches. This migraine usually lasts between 4 and 72 hours and the level of pain can vary significantly.

== Tension-type headache (TTH) ==
A mixed tension migraine falls into category ICHD 2, ICD10 G44.2 of the International Classification of Headache Disorders. Headaches of this category include:

- Infrequent episodic tension-type headache
- Frequent episodic tension-type headache
- Chronic tension-type headache
- Probable tension-type headache

== Symptoms and signs ==
Symptoms of mixed tension include, but are not limited to, the following;

- Nausea and/or vomiting
- Pain on one/both sides of the head
- Neck pain
- Irritability
- Depression
- Sensitivity to sound and/or light
- Numbness and/or tingling sensation of the limbs

== Diagnosis ==
Due to the fact that there is no way to test for a mixed tension migraine, doctors diagnose patients through a process of elimination. Based on the patient's symptoms, physicians rule out other causes. This can be done through neurological examinations in order to rule out neurological disorders and stimulus response tests in order to check if the nervous system is functioning correctly. Other testing may include blood work, CT scans, and in some extreme cases, a lumbar puncture.

Doctors also take into consideration the family history of a patient, as migraines are often genetic.

== Treatment ==
Depending on a patient's symptoms, physicians will prescribe treatment for either a tension headache or a migraine.

=== Medication ===
- Tripitan: Causes the constriction of blood vessels and ease of migraines
- Analgesics: Consists of ibuprofen and aspirin, commonly used to treat less severe migraines or tension headaches
- Ergot Derivative Drugs: Aids in decreasing pain signals transmitted along the nerves
- Non-Steroidal Anti-Inflammatory Drugs: Reduces inflammation
