= Cephalalgiaphobia =

Fear of headaches

- Specialty: Psychology

Cephalalgiaphobia is fear of headaches or getting a headache. Cephalalgia is a Latin-based term for a headache, cephalic meaning head, and algia meaning pain. Harvey Featherstone introduced this phobia in the mid-1980s as a fear of having headache or migraine pain during a pain-free period. Individuals with this phobia often have a history of frequent migraines. Additionally, those with cephalalgiaphobia tend to overuse analgesic medication as a result of their fear. To avoid a future headache or migraine, the individual will preemptively intake analgesic medication to improve their headache. Doctors often do not prescribe pain medications but rather psychiatric medications as a treatment for the phobia. Non-pharmacological treatments using acupuncture therapy have been shown to help reduce the fear of headache pain.

== Prevalence ==
The prevalence of cephalagiaphobia is not well known since there are few reported cases for statistical analysis. Individuals would likely be unaware that their medication use is a phobic response. Cephalalgiaphobia: a possible specific phobia of illness reports a study of 12 patients which found a particular avoidance behavior among these individuals related to having chronic migraine attacks. Their research found a prevalence rate of cephalagiaphobia within their population study to be 60%. The subjects of this study met diagnostic criteria for having a specific phobia based on the DSM-IV, even if it did not relate specifically to cephalagiaphobia.

== Treatments ==
Known treatments for this phobia include medications prescribed to people who have anxiety, depression, and for other phobias; they include selective serotonin reuptake inhibitors, tricyclic antidepressants, benzodiazepines, and various types of psychotherapy. Non-medication treatments for headaches include acupuncture, which has been shown to reduce the fear of headache pain. "Acupuncture use for the treatment of headache prior to neurological referral" discusses the positive benefits on how acupuncture helps to relieve headache symptoms from patients that were studied.

== See also ==
- Medication overuse headache, a headache that is paradoxically caused by taking drugs to prevent headaches
