= Nociceptive trigeminal inhibition tension suppression system =

Type of dental mouthguard

The Nociceptive trigeminal inhibition tension suppression system (abbreviated to NTI-TSS, or NTI-tension suppression system), is a type of occlusal splint that is claimed to prevent headache and migraine by reducing sleep bruxism (night-time tooth clenching and grinding). Sleep bruxism is purported to lead to a hyperactivity of the trigeminal nerve, often triggering typical migraine events. The hyperactivity of trigeminal neurons during trigemino-nociceptive stimulation is a proposed cause of migraine and is correlated with imaging of migraine sufferers. The objective of the NTI-TSS is to relax the muscles involved in clenching and bruxing, thus supposedly diminishing the chances for migraines and tension headaches to develop through the reduction in nociceptive stimulation normally caused by parafunctional activity. It is sometimes used for temporomandibular joint dysfunction (TMD).

The NTI-TSS is a small transparent plastic device which is, in its most widely used form, worn over the front four teeth, of either arch, at night, and intended to prevent contact of the canines and molars. It is normally fitted by a dentist trained in the technique, and is constructed by a dental laboratory.

However, in FDA trials the Nociceptive Trigeminal Inhibition Tension Suppression System (NTI-tss) had been proven to provide a 77% reduction of migraine events in 82% of subjects tested. Practical Neurology Oct. 2005 The origin of the pain must be determined in each individual, and each contributory factor must be addressed. Most migraine sufferers have a combination of two or more of the following: a) vascular pain (pain originating in the arteries of the scalp), b) muscular pain (pain originating from the jaw and neck muscles), c) pain or abnormal sensitivity of the skin of the scalp (known as cutaneous allodynia), and hypersensitivity of the brain to incoming pain messages

== Evidence and safety ==
As the NTI-TSS does not cover all of the teeth, it is classed as a partial coverage occlusal splint. Partial coverage splints are recommended by some experts, but they have the potential to cause unwanted tooth movements if worn 24 hours a day 7 days a week with no tooth contact (which is never recommended), which rarely can be severe. Since the patient cannot wear the NTI-tss device while chewing food, the posterior alveolar structures receive regular stimulation every day, therefore, there is no opportunity for a functional adaptation of the occlusal scheme, that is supra-eruption of the teeth. Research shows that alveolar bone requires at least 8 days of lack of stimulation before bone growth at the apex (supra-eruption) can initiate. Periodontal ligament that surrounds the root and holds the tooth in place - if this ligament is stimulated (exercised) it will continue holding the teeth in correct position.

As for anterior intrusion, the lack of continuous apical force does not provide adequate opportunity to intrude an incisor. A 2010 review of scientific studies carried out to investigate the use of occlusal splints in TMD concluded the following with regards anterior bite appliances (another term for partial coverage occlusal splints that cover only the front teeth):

"Other types of appliances, including [...] anterior bite appliances, have some RCT (randomized control trial) evidence of efficacy in reducing TMD pain. However, the potential for adverse events with these appliances is higher and suggests the need for close monitoring in their use."
