= Barré–Liéou syndrome =

- Other names: Posterior cervical sympathetic syndrome

Barré–Liéou syndrome is a traditional medical diagnosis that is not utilized frequently in modern medicine. It is a complex combination of symptoms, amounting to a headache syndrome, that was originally hypothesized to be due to cervical spondylosis. Damage to the posterior cervical sympathetic chain due to the degeneration of the cervical vertebra was theorized to play a role in this syndrome by the prolapsing of disc in the mid-cervical spine. However, the medical theory as was originally postulated was found to contain inconsistencies.

Barré–Liéou syndrome is regarded by many current medical researchers as synonymous with cervicogenic headache. Thus, the original works of Barré and Liéou were foundational in identifying a crucial feature that distinguishes cervicogenic headache from other headache syndromes—the concept that the pain originates from a structural abnormality in the cervical spine.

== Symptoms ==
Patients with Barré–Liéou syndrome may have complaints of:

- Headache
- Neck pain
- Orofacial pain
- Ear pain
- Toothache
- Tinnitus
- Nasal congestion

== Diagnosis ==
One test to check for Barré–Liéou syndrome is through the use of thermography. An MRI study may also be conducted to rule out any structural problems in the neck which may be the cause of this syndrome.

== Treatment ==
Some of the treatments for this disorder consist of sympathetic nerve blocks, physical therapy, neck brace and traction.

== History ==
The syndrome was first described in 1925 by French neurologist Jean Alexandre Barré. Chinese physician Yong-Cheon Lieou also independently described the syndrome in 1928.
