= RPQ =

RPQ may refer to:

- Request price quotation, in IBM terminology
- Regular path query, in graph databases
- Rivermead Post-Concussion Symptoms Questionnaire, a cognitive test
