= Butalbital =

Barbiturate drug used for headaches

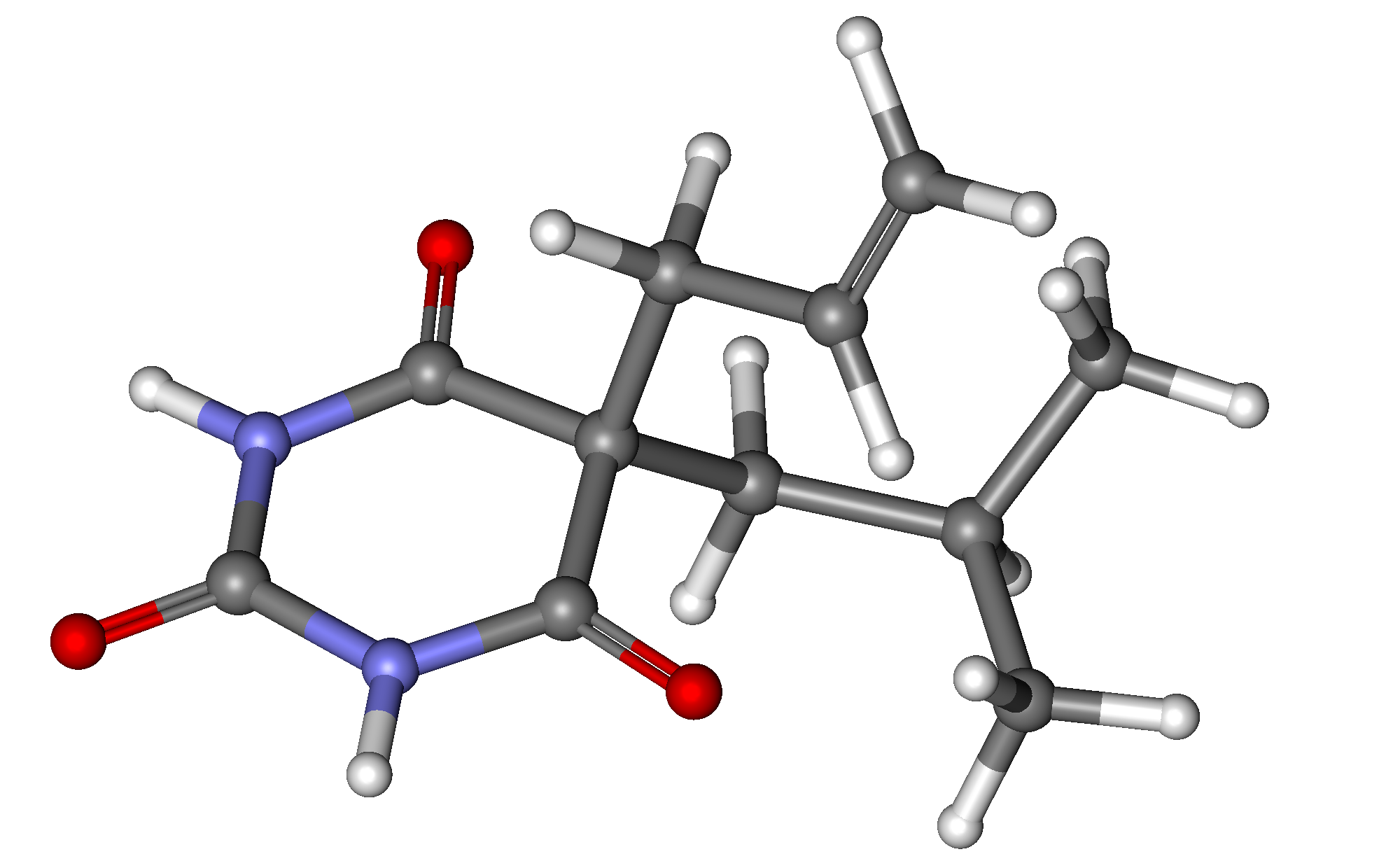

Clinical data
- Other names: 5-allyl-5-isobutylbarbituric acid
- AHFS/Drugs.com: Micromedex Detailed Consumer Information
- MedlinePlus: a601009
- Routes of administration: By mouth
- Drug class: Barbiturate
- ATC code: none

Legal status
- Legal status: BR: Class B1 (Psychoactive drugs); CA: Schedule IV; DE: Anlage II (Authorized trade only, not prescriptible); UK: Class B; US: Schedule III; UN: Psychotropic Schedule III

Pharmacokinetic data
- Bioavailability: 20-45%
- Metabolism: Liver mainly CYP3A4
- Elimination half-life: 35 hours
- Excretion: Kidney

Identifiers
- IUPAC name: 5-(2-Methylpropyl)-5-(2-propenyl)-2,4,6(1H,3H,5H)-pyrimidinetrione
- CAS Number: 77-26-9
- PubChem CID: 2481
- IUPHAR/BPS: 7138
- DrugBank: DB00241
- ChemSpider: 2387
- UNII: KHS0AZ4JVK
- KEGG: D03182
- ChEBI: CHEBI:102524
- ChEMBL: ChEMBL454
- CompTox Dashboard (EPA): DTXSID6022711
- ECHA InfoCard: 100.000.926

Chemical and physical data
- Formula: C_{11}H_{16}N_{2}O_{3}
- Molar mass: 224.260 g·mol^{−1}
- 3D model (JSmol): Interactive image
- SMILES: O=C1NC(=O)NC(=O)C1(CC(C)C)C\C=C
- InChI: InChI=1S/C11H16N2O3/c1-4-5-11(6-7(2)3)8(14)12-10(16)13-9(11)15/h4,7H,1,5-6H2,2-3H3,(H2,12,13,14,15,16); Key:UZVHFVZFNXBMQJ-UHFFFAOYSA-N

Butalbital is a barbiturate with an intermediate duration of action. Butalbital is often combined with other medications, such as paracetamol (acetaminophen) (as butalbital/acetaminophen) or aspirin, for the treatment of pain and headache. The various formulations combined with codeine are FDA-approved for the treatment of tension headaches. Butalbital has the same chemical formula as talbutal but a different structure—namely, 5-allyl-5-isobutylbarbituric acid.

== Available forms ==
Combinations include:

- Butalbital/acetaminophen, butalbital and acetaminophen (paracetamol), (trade names: Axocet, Bucet, Bupap, Cephadyn, Dolgic, Phrenilin, Forte, Sedapap)
- Butalbital/paracetamol/caffeine (trade names: Fioricet, Esgic, Esgic-Plus, Orbivan, Fiormor, Fiortal, Fortabs, Laniroif)
- Butalbital/caffeine/codeine (trade name: Fioricet#3 with Codeine)
- Butalbital/aspirin (trade name: Axotal)
- Butalbital/aspirin/caffeine (trade name: Fiorinal)
- Butalbital/aspirin/caffeine/codeine (trade name: Fiorinal#3 with codeine)
- Ergotamine/caffeine/butalbital/belladonna alkaloids (trade name: Cafergot-PB)

== Contraindications ==
There are specific treatments which are appropriate for targeting migraines and headaches. Butalbital is not recommended as a first-line treatment because it impairs alertness, brings risk of dependence and addiction, and increases the risk that episodic headaches will become chronic. When other treatments are unavailable or ineffective, butalbital may be appropriate if the patient can be monitored to prevent the development of chronic headache.

== Side effects ==
Side effects for butalbital are usually well tolerated. Commonly reported side effects for butalbital, some of which tend to subside with continued use, include:

- Dizziness
- Respiratory depression
- Drowsiness
- Intoxicated feeling
- Lightheadedness
- Nausea
- Sedation
- Euphoria
- Severe impairment of judgment
- Diarrhea
- Memory loss
- Constipation

Rare side effects include Stevens–Johnson syndrome, an adverse reaction to barbiturates, and anaphylaxis.

The risk and severity of all side effects is greatly increased when butalbital are combined with other sedatives (e.g., alcohol, opioids, benzodiazepines, antihistamines). Butalbital when taken with sedatives can cause life-threatening respiratory depression and death. Inhibitors of the hepatic enzyme CYP3A4 may also increase the risk, severity, and duration of side effects; many drugs inhibit this enzyme, as do some foods such as grapefruit and the blood orange.

Butalbital can cause dependence or addiction.

== Interactions ==
Mixing with alcohol, benzodiazepines, and other depressants increases the risk of intoxication, increases respiratory depression, and increases liver toxicity when in combination with paracetamol (acetaminophen). Use of butalbital and alcohol, benzodiazepines, and other depressants can contribute to coma, and in extreme cases, fatality.
