= Claudication =

Any impairment or discomfort in walking

- Specialty: Neurology, rheumatology, vascular surgery
- Treatment: adrenoceptors alpha 1/alpha 2

Claudication is a medical term usually referring to impairment in walking, or pain, discomfort, numbness, or tiredness in the legs that occurs during walking or standing and is relieved by rest. The perceived level of pain from claudication can be mild to extremely severe. Claudication is most common in the calves but it can also affect the feet, thighs, hips, buttocks, or arms. The word claudication comes from Latin claudicare 'to limp'.

Claudication that appears after a short amount of walking may sometimes be described by US medical professionals by the number of typical city street blocks that the patient can walk before the onset of claudication. Thus, "one-block claudication" appears after walking one block, "two-block claudication" appears after walking two blocks, etc. The term block would be understood more exactly locally but is on the order of 100 meters (328 feet).

== Types ==
=== Intermittent vascular ===
Intermittent vascular (or arterial) claudication (Latin: claudicatio intermittens) most often refers to cramping pains in the buttock or leg muscles, especially the calves. It is caused by poor circulation of the blood to the affected area, called peripheral arterial disease. The poor blood flow is often a result of atherosclerotic blockages more proximal to the affected area; individuals with intermittent claudication may have diabetes — often undiagnosed. Another cause, or exacerbating factor, is excessive sitting (several hours), especially in the absence of reasonable breaks, along with a general lack of walking or other exercise that stimulates the legs.

=== Spinal or neurogenic ===
Spinal or neurogenic claudication is not due to lack of blood supply, but rather it is caused by nerve root compression or stenosis of the spinal canal, usually from a degenerative spine, most often at the "L4-L5" or "L5-S1" level. This may result from many factors, including bulging disc, herniated disc or fragments from previously herniated discs (post-operative), scar tissue from previous surgeries, osteophytes (bone spurs that jut out from the edge of a vertebra into the foramen, the opening through which the nerve root passes). In most cases neurogenic claudication is bilateral, i.e. symmetrical.

=== Jaw ===
Jaw claudication is pain in the jaw or ear while chewing. This is caused by insufficiency of the arteries supplying the jaw muscles, associated with giant cell arteritis.

== Diagnosis ==
=== Differential diagnosis ===
Vascular (or arterial) claudication typically occurs after activity or ambulation for a distance with resultant vascular insufficiency (lack of blood flow) where the muscular demands of oxygen outweighs the supply. Symptoms are lower extremity cramping. Resting from activity even in a standing position may help relieve the symptoms. Spinal or neurogenic claudication may be differentiated from arterial claudication based on activity and position. In neurogenic claudication, positional changes lead to increased stenosis (narrowing) of the spinal canal and compression of nerve roots and resultant lower extremity symptoms. Standing and extension of the spine narrows the spinal canal diameter. Sitting and flexion of the spine increases spinal canal diameter. A person with neurogenic claudication will have worsening of leg cramping with standing erect or standing and walking. Symptoms may be relieved by sitting down (flexing the spine) or even by walking while leaning over (flexion of the spine) a shopping cart.

The ability to ride a stationary bike for a prolonged period of time differentiates neurogenic claudication from vascular claudication. Weakness is also a prominent feature of spinal claudication that is not usually present in intermittent claudication.

== Treatment ==
Blocking agents of the adrenoceptors alpha 1/alpha 2 are typically used to treat the effects of the vasoconstriction associated with vascular claudication. Cilostazol (trade name: Pletal) is FDA approved for intermittent claudication. It is contraindicated in patients with heart failure, and improvement of symptoms may not be evident for two to three weeks.

Neurogenic claudication can be treated surgically with spinal decompression.

== Prognosis ==
The prognosis for patients with peripheral vascular disease due to atherosclerosis is poor; patients with intermittent claudication due to atherosclerosis are at increased risk of death from cardiovascular disease (e.g. heart attack), because the same disease that affects the legs is often present in the arteries of the heart.

The prognosis for neurogenic claudication is good if the cause of it can be addressed surgically.
