= Rivermead post-concussion symptoms questionnaire =

- Purpose: measure severity of symptoms of traumatic brain injury

The Rivermead Post-Concussion Symptoms Questionnaire, abbreviated RPQ, is a questionnaire that can be administered to someone who sustains a concussion or other form of traumatic brain injury to measure the severity of symptoms. The RPQ is used to determine the presence and severity of post-concussion syndrome (PCS), a set of somatic, cognitive, and emotional symptoms following traumatic brain injury that may persist anywhere from a week, to months, or even more than six months.

The RPQ has been cited in over 40 papers. The test was presented in 1995 by a group led by N.S. King. At the time of its design, no measure of PCS severity had been developed.

== Questionnaire contents ==
The test, which can be self-administered or given by an interviewer, asks patients to rate the severity of 16 different symptoms commonly found after a mild traumatic brain injury (MTBI). Patients are asked to rate how severe each of the 16 symptoms has been over the past 24 hours. In each case, the symptom is compared with how severe it was before the injury occurred (premorbid). These symptoms are reported by severity on a scale from 0 to 4: not experienced, no more of a problem, mild problem, moderate problem, and severe problem.

The questionnaire asks the patient to assess the following symptoms:

- Headaches
- Feelings of dizziness
- Nausea and/or vomiting
- Hyperacusis (noise sensitivity)
- Sleep disturbance
- Fatigue, tiring more easily
- Being irritable, easily angered
- Feeling depressed or tearful
- Feeling frustrated or impatient
- Forgetfulness, poor memory
- Poor concentration
- Taking longer to think
- Blurred vision
- Light sensitivity (easily upset by bright light)
- Double vision
- Restlessness

The first three symptoms are referred to as RPQ-3, also known as RPQh (RPQ head), and are the early (immediately following injury) symptoms associated with post-concussion syndrome. The other thirteen are referred to as RPQ-13, also known as RPQgen (RPQ general), and are the late symptoms associated with the syndrome. Late symptoms can occur days to weeks after the initial injury, although headaches and dizziness can persist well into the "late stage" as well. RPQ-3 symptoms are regarded as the more "physical" symptoms, whereas the RPQ-13 set of symptoms are considered to have a more significant impact on psychic and social function. The questionnaire also includes a space for the test-taker to report any additional symptoms they may be experiencing since the onset of the injury.

=== Questionnaire Administration ===
The questionnaire may be self-administered, administered in person by a second party, or administered over telephone. The questionnaire can feasibly be used as any other neuropsychological test for assessment of concussions would, including following MTBI following accidents or sports-related injury. The questionnaire can also be used for the assessment of conditions that show symptoms similar to PCS, such as chronic pain.

== Relationship to Post-Concussion Syndrome ==
=== Inclusion/Exclusion of Known Symptoms ===
The questionnaire includes a selection of cognitive, somatic, and emotional symptoms associated with post-concussion syndrome. These symptoms were analyzed separately as individual clusters to determine frequency among PCS patients, although these clusters are not formally associated with the development and intentions of the questionnaire itself.

Fatigue is the most frequently affirmed symptom of PCS included on the questionnaire, while double vision is the least affirmed. Some other neuropsychological tests do not include fatigue as a symptom of PCS, giving the Rivermead Post-Concussion Symptoms Questionnaire an advantage in an "accurate" assessment of the condition. Severe fatigue has been reported in at least a third of a representative cohort of MTBI patients, and this symptom was associated with a significant limitation of the ability of patients to function normally in daily activities.

Post-concussion syndrome is believed to be able to arise for reasons aside from sustaining a (mild) traumatic brain injury. In one study, health professionals cited organic causes in general as being most responsible for the development of PCS; however, emotional and compensatory causes have also been implicated as factors. For example, depression may contribute to the development or severity of PCS, whether triggered by a physical injury or not. PCS symptoms also overlap with symptoms associated with other conditions, such as chronic pain. Because of this, the Rivermead Post-Concussion Symptoms Questionnaire is useful in the assessment of other conditions besides MTBI-induced PCS. The questionnaire has been used in studies with a slightly altered wording in order to remove references to head injuries, so that test-takers don't assume their symptoms are (or are not) derived solely from a head injury and so the questionnaire can be more broadly utilized.

=== Validity ===
The RPQ has been shown to fit best to a two-factor model of the syndrome (see Factor analysis), with somatic and emotional symptoms collapsed into one factor and cognitive symptoms in another. This is due to high covariance in reported symptom severity scores between the symptoms classified as "somatic" and "emotional". RPQ-3 and RPQ-13 symptoms (not corresponding to somatic and emotional scales) are also scored separately, as they have shown to fit poorly to the Rasch model when scored on a single scale. In doing this, each scale forms a unidimensional construct, demonstrating good test-retest reliability. Further studies are necessary to establish any predictive value of the RPQ, however.

The questionnaire has displayed several flaws in implementation and its ability to accurately reflect test-taker experience. While the questionnaire includes symptoms non-specific to PCS, which allows for a broader range of diagnosis (i.e. of other conditions such as chronic pain), this is at the expense of precision. The questionnaire is a useful tool for assessing progress or regression of symptom severity, but it is not ideal for actual diagnosis as there is no standard criteria for what constitutes post-concussion syndrome. The only feature characteristic of PCS that is generally agreed upon among health professionals is a significant impairment of the ability to function socially. Recreational drug use, for instance, can often result in symptoms similar to those associated with PCS, making it difficult to determine the severity of a head injury if the victim is a habitual drug user. Despite this, studies have used the RPQ as a way of meeting criteria that may not be universally agreed upon, such as those found in the Diagnostic and Statistical Manual of Mental Disorders (specifically DSM-IV-TR).

Self-administration is commonly used for the RPQ, raising several issues of concern. Interpretation and accuracy of the RPQ can vary widely due to self-administration and the various confounding variables involved. In one study, higher average severity scores were associated with patients involved in litigation at the time the questionnaire was administered. Studies using other neuropsychological assessments for post-concussion syndrome or general cognitive performance have also shown poor test-taker effort to affect the reported severity of symptoms.

Opinions on the questionnaire itself are also mixed amongst health professionals, with a small percentage believing that the questionnaire and in fact no treatment efforts at all were useful for post-concussion syndrome.

== See also ==
- Concussion grading systems
- Head injury criterion
- Mild traumatic brain injury
- Neuropsychological test
- Post-concussion syndrome
- Post-traumatic stress disorder
