= Cervicogenic headache =

Headache in the cervical spine or neck

Cervicogenic headache is a type of headache characterized by chronic hemicranial pain referred to the head from either the cervical spine or soft tissues within the neck. The main symptoms of cervicogenic headaches include pain originating in the neck that can travel to the head or face, headaches that get worse with neck movement, and limited ability to move the neck.

Diagnostic imaging can display lesions of the cervical spine or soft tissue of the neck that can be indicative of a cervicogenic headache. When being evaluated for cervicogenic headaches, it is important to rule out a history of migraines and traumatic brain injuries.

Studies show that combining interventions such as moist heat applied to the area of pain, spinal and cervical manipulations, and neck massages all help reduce or relieve symptoms. Neck exercises are also beneficial. Specifically, craniocervical flexion, or forward bending of the neck, against light resistance helps increase muscular stability of the head and neck region. This may reduce head and neck pain. It is recommended to seek assistance from trained health professionals, such as physical therapists, who can teach proper techniques and doses of exercise. With proper treatment, symptoms often resolve in three months.

== See also ==
- NIH classification of headaches: Cervicogenic
- Barré–Liéou syndrome
