= Ophthalmodynia periodica =

- Other names: Needle-in-the-eye syndrome, sharp short-lived head pain, jabs and jolts syndrome

Ophthalmodynia periodica, also known as "ice-pick headache", is a primary headache disorder, so it is not caused by any other conditions.

== Signs and symptoms ==
1. Stabbing sensations, usually in one area of the head
2. Pain may move to different areas of the head
3. Pain lasts for a few seconds ("usually 5–30")
4. Pain appears out of nowhere
5. Pain is completely gone after each occurrence
6. Each occurrence happens at varied frequencies

== Cause ==
Ophthalmodynia periodica does not have a confirmed cause, being a primary headache, but can be identified with other primary conditions. "As many as 40% of all individuals with ice pick headaches have also been diagnosed as suffering with some form of migraine headache."

== Diagnosis ==
The following diagnostic criteria are given for ophthalmodynia periodica:

1. Head pain occurring as a single stab or a series of stabs
2. Can be felt in the areas surrounding the eyes and temples but is "typically felt on the top, front, or sides of the head"
3. Pain lasting only a few seconds with irregular frequency
4. No cranial autonomic symptoms
5. "Not attributed to another disorder"

=== Classification ===
The International Headache Society classifies ophthalmodynia periodica as a primary stabbing headache.

== Epidemiology ==
Ophthalmodynia periodica was first discovered by a doctor in 1964, where the disorder was first referred to as ophthalmodynia periodica. Since then, the disorder has been referred to as idiopathic stabbing headache.
