= National Telecommuting Institute =

U.S. non-proft organization

NTI, Inc. is an American nonprofit organization that seeks to promote teleworking as a means of providing accessible employment opportunities to the disabled community. The organization is based in Boston.

The primary roles NTI fills include Call Centers, Sales, Customer Service, Tier I and Tier II Help Desk roles. NTI supplies call center technology in addition to personnel.

== History ==
NTI was established on June 23, 1995, by three founders: Dr. Paul Corcoran, Chairman of the Rehabilitation Department at the Tufts New England Medical Center; Dr. Mark Schlesinger, Chairman of the Health Economics Department at Yale; and Dr. M.J. Willard, a Behavioral Psychologist with 15 years of experience assisting individuals with severe physical disabilities in their home environment.

Following the inception of NTI, the non-profit expanded into three divisions: NTI@Home, LandAjob, and The Staffing Connection.

The Medical Transcription (MT) division was disbanded at the end of 2014.

== Funding ==
NTI receives its primary funding from participating state vocational rehabilitation agencies, competitive grant programs, charitable donations, and the Social Security Administration's Ticket to Work program as a participating Employment Network. Organizations and programs that have generously provided grants and donations to NTI include The AT&T Foundation, the Charles Stewart Mott Foundation, The Fidelity Foundation, the Robert Wood Johnson Foundation, the U.S. Department of Education: RSA Project With Industries, and the U.S. Department of Labor: Office of Disability Employment Policy.

== Employment Fields ==
Initially, the fields such as indexing, medical billing, transcription, proofreading, and appointment reminder services were amenable to telecommuting. However, over the past 14 years most of these positions have faded away due to the evolution of cloud based services and technology. Now, the greatest opportunity to employ individuals with disabilities in at home positions exists within the fields of Customer Service, Sales, and Technology Services; such as Tier I and Tier II support.

Over 90% of NTI's work-at-home placements were within call centers and help desks. Previous NTI work-at-home agents with disabilities have been hired by employers including the IRS, Ticket Master, and AAA Roadside Assistance.

In 2004, NTI was awarded a JWOD contract with the Internal Revenue Service, placing hundreds of employees for tax forms assistance.

=== Vocational Rehabilitation Systems ===
The 70-year-old federal/state vocational rehabilitation (VR) system is the largest network providing help to the 1.2 million disabled Americans who request government assistance in finding work each year. Collectively, state VR agencies operate with a budget of $2.8 billion. The VR agencies have staff and a charter to develop home-based opportunities, but relatively few alternatives to offer their clients within their immediate communities.

State agencies often use some of their funds to purchase services from non-profit organizations such as NTI when their clients in the disability community require specialized assistance. NTI works through VR agencies in approaching low-income members of the disability community who can become home-based teleworkers to meet the growing demand from companies needing CSRs. As of 2009, NTI has standing agreements with 47 state VR agencies.
