= Nti =

Nti is a surname. Notable people with the surname include:

- Collins Agyarko Nti (born 1958), Ghanaian politician
- Opoku Nti (born 1961), Ghanaian footballer
- Theophidack Nti (1977–2017), Ghanaian footballer
