= Jaw claudication =

Pain in the jaw while chewing

- Differential diagnosis: giant cell artiritis

Jaw claudication is pain in the jaw associated with chewing. It is a classic symptom of giant-cell arteritis, but can be confused with symptoms of temporomandibular joint disease, rheumatoid arthritis of the temporomandibular joint, myasthenia gravis, tumors of the parotid gland, or occlusion or stenosis of the external carotid artery.

The term is derived by analogy from claudication of the leg, where pain is caused by arterial insufficiency.
