= Medication overuse headache =

- Other names: Rebound headache
- Specialty: Neurology

A medication overuse headache (MOH), also known as a rebound headache, usually occurs when painkillers are taken frequently to relieve headaches. These cases are often referred to as painkiller headaches. Rebound headaches frequently occur daily, can be very painful and are a common cause of chronic daily headache (CDH). They typically occur in patients with an underlying headache disorder such as migraine or tension-type headache that "transforms" over time from an episodic condition to chronic daily headache due to excessive intake of acute headache relief medications. MOH is a serious, disabling and well-characterized disorder, which represents a worldwide problem and is now considered the third-most prevalent type of headache. The proportion of patients in the population with CDH who overuse acute medications ranges from 18% to 33%. The prevalence of MOH varies depending on the population studied and diagnostic criteria used. However, it is estimated that MOH affects approximately 1-2% of the general population, but its relative frequency is much higher in secondary and tertiary care. Medication overuse is responsible for more than 20% of all headache-related disability globally.

== Classification ==
Medication overuse headache is a recognized ICHD (International Classification of Headache Disorders) classification. Over the years different sets of diagnostic criteria have been proposed and revised by the major experts of headache disorders. The term MOH first appeared in the ICHD 2nd edition in 2004. It was defined as a secondary headache, with the aim of emphasising excessive drug intake as the basis of this form of headache. The two subsequent revisions of the diagnostic criteria for MOH (2005 and 2006) refined and extended the definition of the condition on the basis of both its chronicity (headache on more than 15 days/month for more than three months) and drug classes, thereby identifying the main types of MOH. In the case of ergotamine, triptans, opioids and combination medications in particular, intake on ≥10 days/month for >3 months is required, whereas simple analgesics are considered overused when they are taken on ≥15 days/month for >3 months.

== Causes ==
MOH is known to occur with frequent, chronic use of many pain or headache medications, including most commonly: triptans, ergotamines, opioids, and non-opioid analgesics (including paracetamol and NSAIDs), as well as combination medicines, or with multiple of these taken together at a lower frequency. This includes the common over-the-counter medications Advil, Excedrin Migraine, and Cafergot. Nearly any acute headache medication can be a cause. Dietary or medicinal caffeine also appears to be a modest risk factor for chronic daily headache, regardless of headache type.

A long history of headaches is a major risk factor. The condition is very rare in patients without a history of recurrent headaches, seeming to never develop in those taking analgesics who experience only non-headache pain (such as arthritis or irritable bowel syndrome). Furthermore, it seems to be more probable with a family history of MOH, though more research is needed to confirm this.

Research theorizes that several mechanisms may play a part in the development of overuse headaches, and it is possible but unknown if a single underlying mechanism exists across different medication types. It is thought that as part of neuronal re-adjustment, chronic pain medication usage alters headache pathways. Several mechanisms are proposed, including changes in cortical neuronal excitability, central sensitization of the trigeminal nerves, and changes in the serotonergic, dopaminergic, and endocannabinoid systems. A PET study in patients with chronic analgesic overuse showed decreased activity in the orbitofrontal cortex of the brain, which is also seen in substance abuse. This suggests that there may be an underlying neurological susceptibility to addiction in some individuals. However, the interplay of these mechanisms is complex and only partially understood.

The average time it takes to develop MOH depends on the type of medication used; research indicates the average duration for triptans is 1.7 years, 2.7 years for ergotamine, and 4.8 years for simple analgesics.

The underlying mechanisms behind the condition are still widely unknown, and clarification is hampered by a lack of experimental research or suitable animal models. Various pathophysiological abnormalities have been reported, with important roles in initiating and maintaining chronic headache (genetic disposition, receptor and enzyme physiology and regulation, psychological and behavioural factors, physical dependencies, recent functional imaging results).

=== Headache treatment ===
Opioids and butalbital are sometimes inappropriately used as treatment for migraine and headache, and should be avoided in favor of more effective, migraine-specific treatments. The use of these medications can worsen headaches and cause MOH. When a patient fails to respond to other treatment, or migraine specific treatment is unavailable, then opioids may be considered.

Regular use of over-the-counter drugs (OTC) such as paracetamol and NSAIDs can also be a cause of MOH. OTC medication for headache should be limited to no more than two days per week, and it is recommended to seek medical counsel for any pain lasting more than a few days. Concurrent with MOH, overuse of paracetamol (also known as acetaminophen) for treating headaches may cause liver damage, and NSAID overuse can cause gastrointestinal bleeding.

== Prevention ==
In general, any patient who has frequent headaches or migraine attacks should be considered as a potential candidate for preventive medications instead of being encouraged to take more and more painkillers or other rebound-causing medications. Preventive medications are taken on a daily basis. Some patients may require preventive medications for many years; others may require them for only a relatively short period of time such as six months. Effective preventive medications have been found to come from many classes of medications including neuronal stabilizing agents (aka anticonvulsants), antidepressants, antihypertensives, and antihistamines. Some effective preventive medications include Elavil (amitriptyline), Depakote (valproate), Topamax (topiramate), and Inderal (propranolol).

== Treatment ==
MOH is common and can be treated. The overused medications must be stopped for the patient's headache to resolve, though there is limited evidence to suggest this can be done without using other preventive measures. Clinical data shows that the treatment of choice is abrupt drugs withdrawal, followed by starting prophylactic therapy. However, the discontinuation of overused drugs may lead to the initial worsening of headaches, nausea, vomiting, sleep disturbance, anxiety, and restlessness. These symptoms greatly depend on the previously overused drugs and typically last from two to ten days. They are relieved by the further intake of the overused medication, which might reinforce the continuation of overuse and noncompliance toward discontinuation. Where physical dependence or a rebound effect such as rebound headache is possible, gradual reduction of medication may be necessary. It is important that the patient's physician be consulted before abruptly discontinuing certain medications as such a course of action has the potential to induce medically significant physical withdrawal symptoms. Abruptly discontinuing butalbital, for example, can actually induce seizures in some patients, although simple over the counter analgesics can safely be stopped by the patient without medical supervision. A long-acting analgesic/anti-inflammatory, such as naproxen (500 mg twice a day), can be used to ease headache during the withdrawal period. Two months after the completion of a medication withdrawal, patients with MOH typically notice a marked reduction in headache frequency and intensity.

Drug withdrawal is performed very differently within and across countries. Most physicians prefer inpatients programmes, however effective drug withdrawal may also be achieved in an outpatient setting in uncomplicated MOH patients (i.e. subjects without important co-morbidities, not overusing opioids or ergotaminics and who are at their first detoxification attempt). In the absence of evidence-based indications, in MOH patients the choice of preventive agent should be based on the primary headache type (migraine or TTH), on the drug side-effect profile, on the presence of co-morbid and co-existent conditions, on patient's preferences, and on previous therapeutic experiences.

Following an initial improvement of headache with the return to an episodic pattern, a relevant proportion (up to 45%) of patients relapse, reverting to the overuse of symptomatic drugs.

Predictors of the relapse, and that could influence treatment strategies, are considered the type of primary headache, from which MOH has evolved, and the type of drug abused (analgesics, and mostly combination of analgesics, but also drugs containing barbiturates or tranquillisers cause significantly higher relapse rates), while gender, age, duration of disease and previous intake of preventative treatment do not seem to predict relapse rate.

MOH is clearly a cause of disability and, if not adequately treated, it represents a condition of risk of possible co-morbidities associated to the excessive intake of drugs that are not devoid of side-effect. MOH can be treated through withdrawal of the overused drug(s) and by means of specific approaches that focus on the development of a close doctor-patient relationship in the post-withdrawal period.

== History ==
Rebound headache was first described by Dr. Lee Kudrow in 1982.

== See also ==
- Cluster headache
