= SS William Osler =

Liberty ship of WWII

History

United States
- Name: William Osler
- Namesake: William Osler
- Owner: War Shipping Administration (WSA)
- Operator: States Marine Corp.
- Ordered: as type (EC2-S-C1) hull, MCE hull 954
- Awarded: 30 January 1942
- Builder: Bethlehem-Fairfield Shipyard, Baltimore, Maryland
- Cost: $1,065,435
- Yard number: 2104
- Way number: 14
- Laid down: 6 February 1943
- Launched: 6 March 1943
- Completed: 22 March 1943
- Identification: Call sign: KKNN
- Fate: Transferred to the War Department, 22 November 1943
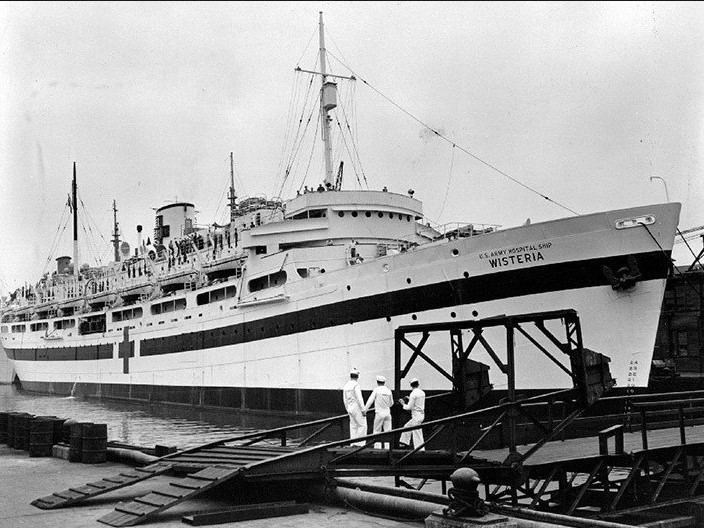
- USAHS Wisteria, moored pierside, unknown date and location

United States
- Name: Wisteria
- Namesake: Wisteria
- Builder: Bethlehem Steel Co., Brooklyn, New York
- Completed: 15 July 1944
- Commissioned: July 1944
- Decommissioned: June 1947
- Reclassified: USAHS (United States Army Ship)
- Fate: Laid up in the reserve fleet, 24 June 1947, sold for scrapping, 27 March 1968

General characteristics
- Class & type: Liberty ship; type EC2-S-C1, standard
- Tonnage: 10,865 LT DWT; 7,176 GRT
- Displacement: 3,380 long tons (3,434 t) (light); 14,245 long tons (14,474 t) (max)
- Length: 441 feet 6 inches (135 m) oa; 416 feet (127 m) pp; 427 feet (130 m) lwl
- Beam: 57 feet (17 m)
- Draft: 27 ft 9.25 in (8.4646 m)
- Installed power: 2 × Oil fired 450 °F (232 °C) boilers, operating at 220 psi (1,500 kPa); 2,500 hp (1,900 kW)
- Propulsion: 1 × triple-expansion steam engine, (manufactured by Ellicott Machine Corp., Baltimore, Maryland); 1 × screw propeller
- Speed: 11.5 knots (21.3 km/h; 13.2 mph)
- Capacity: 562,608 cubic feet (15,931 m^{3}) (grain); 499,573 cubic feet (14,146 m^{3}) (bale)
- Complement: 38–62 USMM (cargo ship); 21–40 USNAG (cargo ship); 123 Crewmen (Hospital ship); 17 Army officers (Hospital ship); 39 nurses (Hospital ship); 159 attendants (hospital ship)
- Armament: Varied by ship; Bow-mounted 3-inch (76 mm)/50-caliber gun; Stern-mounted 4-inch (102 mm)/50-caliber gun; 2–8 × single 20-millimeter (0.79 in) Oerlikon anti-aircraft (AA) cannons and/or, 2–8 × 37-millimeter (1.46 in) M1 AA guns

SS William Osler was a Liberty ship built in the United States during World War II. She was named after William Osler, a Canadian physician and one of the "Big Four" founding professors of Johns Hopkins Hospital. Osler created the first residency program for specialty training of physicians. He was instrumental in founding the Medical Library Association of Great Britain and Ireland, and the (North American) Association of Medical Librarians (later the Medical Library Association). He left his own large history of medicine library to McGill, where it became the Osler Library.

== Construction ==
William Osler was laid down on 6 February 1943, under a Maritime Commission (MARCOM) contract, MCE hull 954, by the Bethlehem-Fairfield Shipyard, Baltimore, Maryland; she was launched on 6 March 1943.

== History ==
She was allocated to the Marine Transport Lines, Inc., on 22 March 1943.

=== Conversion to United States Army Hospital Ship ===
On 22 November 1943, she was purchased by the War Department for conversion to a hospital ship for the United States Army. She was transferred to the Bethlehem Steel Company's 27th St. Yard, in Brooklyn, New York, on 23 November 1943.

From 23 November 1943 to 15 July 1944, she was converted to a hospital ship. All of her cargo handling gear was removed, with additional ballast added to compensate the removal of superstructure, bulkheads, piping, and insulation. New fresh-water tanks were added in hold #4 and #5, with the addition of several of the double-hull fuel tanks being converted for fresh-water storage. The hull was strengthened by the addition of an 18 in (460 mm) wide, 1 in (25 mm) thick, steel band rivetted around 80% of the hull. There were additional plating added to the upper deck with steel girders installed at points of stress and new bulkheads and partitions built. The hatch openings on the main and second decks were closed. A third deck, in addition to a new superstructure, special top, and bridge decks were built.

Insulation was added for hot and cold climates, with over 400 radiators and 28 separate ventilating units. Distilling equipment was added that could supply 160 t (160 long tons; 180 short tons) of fresh water. There were eight refrigerated spaces, totaling 15,000 cu ft (420 m^{3}).

A "lower deck" was constructed within the hull. The new construction had taken her to a bare shell, then added over 300 new spaces for rooms, wards, clinics, morgues, autopsy rooms, x-ray rooms, laboratories, and operating theaters.

Forty-four wards, capable of handling from 2–108 beds, were built, with an expected capacity of almost 600 patients. Thirty-five rooms were built for the medical staff, with forty-one rooms built for the ships crew. The new construction also included wards that were designated to mental patients, along with cells for violent patients.

A new funnel was constructed to enable a 12 ft (3.7 m) Red Cross symbol to be fitted.

== Fate ==
She was declared surplus and laid up in the Defense Reserve Fleet, in Astoria, Oregon, on 24 June 1947. On 29 February 1968, she was sold, along with 6 other ships, for $356,898.99, to Oregon Shipwreckers, Inc., for scrapping. She was withdrawn from the fleet on 27 March 1968.

== Bibliography ==
- "Bethlehem-Fairfield, Baltimore MD". www.ShipbuildingHistory.com. 7 August 2021.
- Maritime Administration. "William Osler". Ship History Database Vessel Status Card. U.S. Department of Transportation, Maritime Administration.
- Davies, James (May 2004). "Specifications (As-Built)" (PDF). p. 23.
- "SS William Osler".
- Priolo, Gary P. (2 May 2025). "USAHS Wisteria".
- Sawyer, L.A.; Mitchell, W.H. (1985). The Liberty Ships. Bury St. Edmunds, Suffolk, Great Britain: St. Edmundsbury Press Ltd. ISBN 1850440492.
