= Edward Liveing =

English physician (1832–1919)

- Born: 8 February 1832
- Died: 2 April 1919 (aged 87); Nayland, Suffolk
- Education: King's College, London

Edward Liveing (8 February 1832 – 2 April 1919) was an English physician who published a theory of migraine pathogenesis in his book On Megrim.

== Biography ==
Edward Liveing was born in Nayland, Suffolk on 8 February 1832, the second son of Dr. Edward Liveing, who was the father of four sons and seven daughters with his wife Catherine Mary Liveing née Downing. The eldest son was the chemist George Downing Liveing, and the 3rd son was the dermatologist Robert Liveing. Edward Liveing (the younger) studied medicine and natural philosophy at King's College, London, including medical work at King's College Hospital that made him M.R.C.S. in 1854. He then matriculated at Caius College, Cambridge in 1854. On 29 August 1854 he married Frances Jane (Tassie) Torlesse. At Cambridge he graduated B.A. in 1858 and M.B. in 1859, before returning to London as assistant physician at King's College Hospital. There he was made M.R.C.P. in 1859 and he collected clinical material on migraine. From Cambridge, he received his M.D. in 1870 (after sending his M.D. thesis on migraine to Cambridge in 1868). At Cambridge he acted as an examiner in medicine from 1870 to 1871. Liveing's famous book On Megrim was published in 1873. He was elected a fellow of Caius College in 1874. At King's College Hospital, he was made F.R.C.P. in 1874. In addition to his work as an assistant physician at King's College Hospital, Liveing served for the Royal College of Physicians as Assistant Registrar in 1886–1889 and then as Registrar in 1889–1909. He was a consulting physician at St Marylebone general dispensary. Liveing had a medical practice at 52 Cavendish Square from 1870 to 1919.

Liveing's first wife died in 1885; their marriage produced three sons and two daughters. Liveing married again but his second marriage was childless.

Edward Liveing died on 2 April 1919.

Liveing was credited in the chapter titled "migraine" in the first seven editions of Sir William Osler's The Principles and Practice of Medicine. British neurologist Oliver Sacks attributes reading a book by him to his career choice and as an inspiration to write his first book Migraine.
