= Diocesan Theological Institute =

Coordinates: 43°57′37″N 78°09′31″W

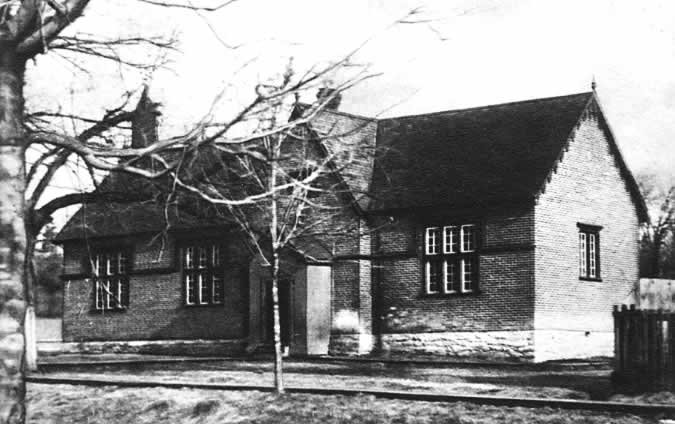
The Diocesan Theological Institute c. 1848

The Diocesan Theological Institute was an Anglican seminary founded by John Strachan in Cobourg, Canada West, on 10 January 1842. In 1852 the Institute was succeeded by the Faculty of Divinity of Trinity College, a federated university within the University of Toronto from 1904. The Trinity College Literary Institute, one of Canada's oldest student and debating societies, began as the debating society of the Diocesan Theological Institute in the 1840s.

The seminary building was designed by Henry Bowyer Lane, later acquired as a school. In 1906 Mary Haskell of Chicago bought the home, and it was altered into a private residence at 174 Green Street (Haskell House).

== Notable students ==
- William Arthur Johnson 1848-1851: clergyman and founder of Trinity College School
