= Osler's sign =

Osler's sign may refer to:

- Osler's sign, pseudohypertension
- Osler's sign, pretibial myxedema
- Osler's sign, Osler's node, which are nodes associated with acute bacterial endocarditis
