= William Arthur Johnson (biologist) =

Canadian biologist

Rev. William Arthur Johnson (1816–1880) was an amateur biologist, naturalist, microscopist, botanist, and ordained clergyman who lived in Canada.

== Biography ==
Known as Arthur, Johnson was born in Bombay, India. His father, John Johnson, served under the future Duke of Wellington in the army of the East India Company in the early 1800s. The future Duke may have been his godfather. Johnson moved in Upper Canada in 1835, first settling in Port Maitland, Ontario, then to Toronto by 1848. He attended the Diocesan Theological Institute in Cobourg, Ontario and became a clergyman. He was a curate to Archdeacon A. N. Bethune at Cobourg. However, his tractarian tendencies made him unpopular and he was made rector of St.Philip's at Etobicoke, a remote village across the river from Weston. There, he established a school in 1865 that was to become Trinity College School in Weston, Ontario, where William Osler became a student. Johnson became the major early influence for Osler at this time, along with his friend James Bovell. A keen collector of both animal and vegetal specimens, Johnson was schoolmaster and rector of St. Philip's Church, Weston. Johnson died in Toronto in 1880. A collection of his microscopic and field sketches are conserved at the Osler Library of the History of Medicine, McGill University.
