= Migraine (book) =

1970 book by Oliver Sacks

- Author: Oliver Sacks
- Subject: Migraine
- Publisher: Vintage Books
- Publication date: 1970, rev. ed. 1992
- Pages: 368
- ISBN: 978-0-375-70406-2 (1999)
- Dewey Decimal: 616.857 SAC
- LC Class: RC392 .S3
- Followed by: Awakenings

Migraine is the first book written by Oliver Sacks, a well-known New York City-based neurologist and author. The full title of the first edition was Migraine: Evolution of a Common Disorder. The book was written in 1967, mostly over a nine-day period, and first published in 1970. A revised and updated version was published in 1992. (In the newer edition, the last chapter Migraine Aura and Hallucinatory Constants was written in collaboration with Ralph M. Siegel.)

== Summary ==
As with Sacks's other writings, Migraine is a comprehensive review of the subject aimed at the lay population and uses numerous case histories. Sacks describes the nature of and treatments for migraine in general and several various subtypes, particularly examining the visual aura feature that is common to many sufferers, along with the pre-migraine signs & symptoms. The particular focus of the book, however, is on the neuropsychological aspects of migraine.

== Contents ==
The book is divided into five sections:

1. The Experience of Migraine
2. The Occurrence of Migraine
3. The Basis of Migraine
4. Therapeutic Approaches to Migraine
5. Migraine as a Universal

== Inspiration for writing the book ==
In an interview with Neil deGrasse Tyson about the possible merits of altered states of consciousness by means of psychoactive substance, Sacks revealed that in 1967 he had a revelation when he was under the influence of an undisclosed psychoactive substance while reading a book written in the 19th century about headaches and migraines. This book was written by Edward Liveing, an early and important contributor in theories of migraine pathogenesis. As he was reading the book he had an awakening and thought to himself, "Who shall be the Edward Liveing of our time? And there was a very disingenuous clamor of names that came to me, followed by a very loud inner voice which said, 'You Silly Bugger! You're the man!'"

== See also ==
- International Classification of Headache Disorders
- Management of chronic headaches
