= The Principles and Practice of Medicine =

Medicine textbook

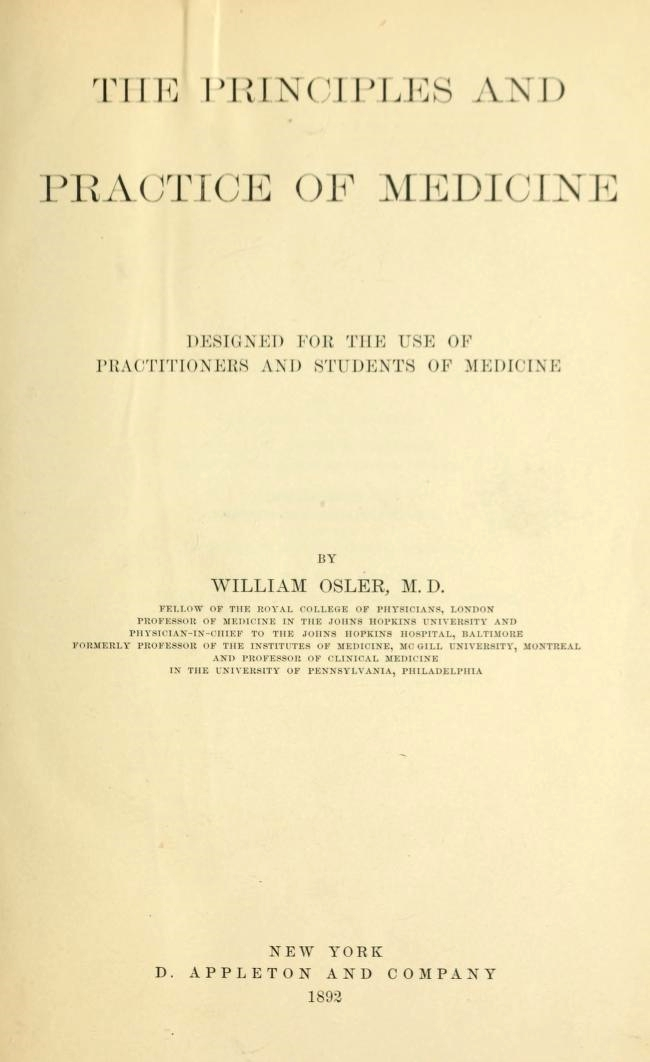
The Principles and Practice of Medicine title page, first edition, 1892.

The Principles and Practice of Medicine: Designed for the Use of Practitioners and Students of Medicine is a medical textbook by Sir William Osler. It was first published in 1892 by D. Appleton & Company, while Osler was professor of Medicine at Johns Hopkins University. The book established Osler as the world's leading authority in the teaching of modern medicine at that time.

The text was translated into French, German, Russian, Portuguese, Spanish and Chinese, and for over 40 years it was the standard western medical textbook.

== First edition ==
Osler dedicated the book to his teachers; William Arthur Johnson, James Bovell and Robert Palmer Howard. There are 11 sections, preceded by a list of charts and illustrations.

Included in the book is a chapter on migraine, which gives credit to Edward Liveing.

== Later years ==
In later editions of The Principles and Practice of Medicine, Osler described four main theories of migraine: toxic substances produced within the body, changes in blood vessels, irritation from other parts of the body such as the eyes or nose, and temporary blockage of fluid flow within the brain.

After 1927, the book's popularity was succeeded by Cecil Textbook of Medicine. A revised eleventh edition appeared in 1932.

== Bibliography ==
- Golden, Richard L.; Library, Osler; Society, American Osler (2004). A History of William Osler's The Principles and Practice of Medicine. Osler Library, McGill University. ISBN 978-0-7717-0615-8.
