= Robert Liveing =

English physician

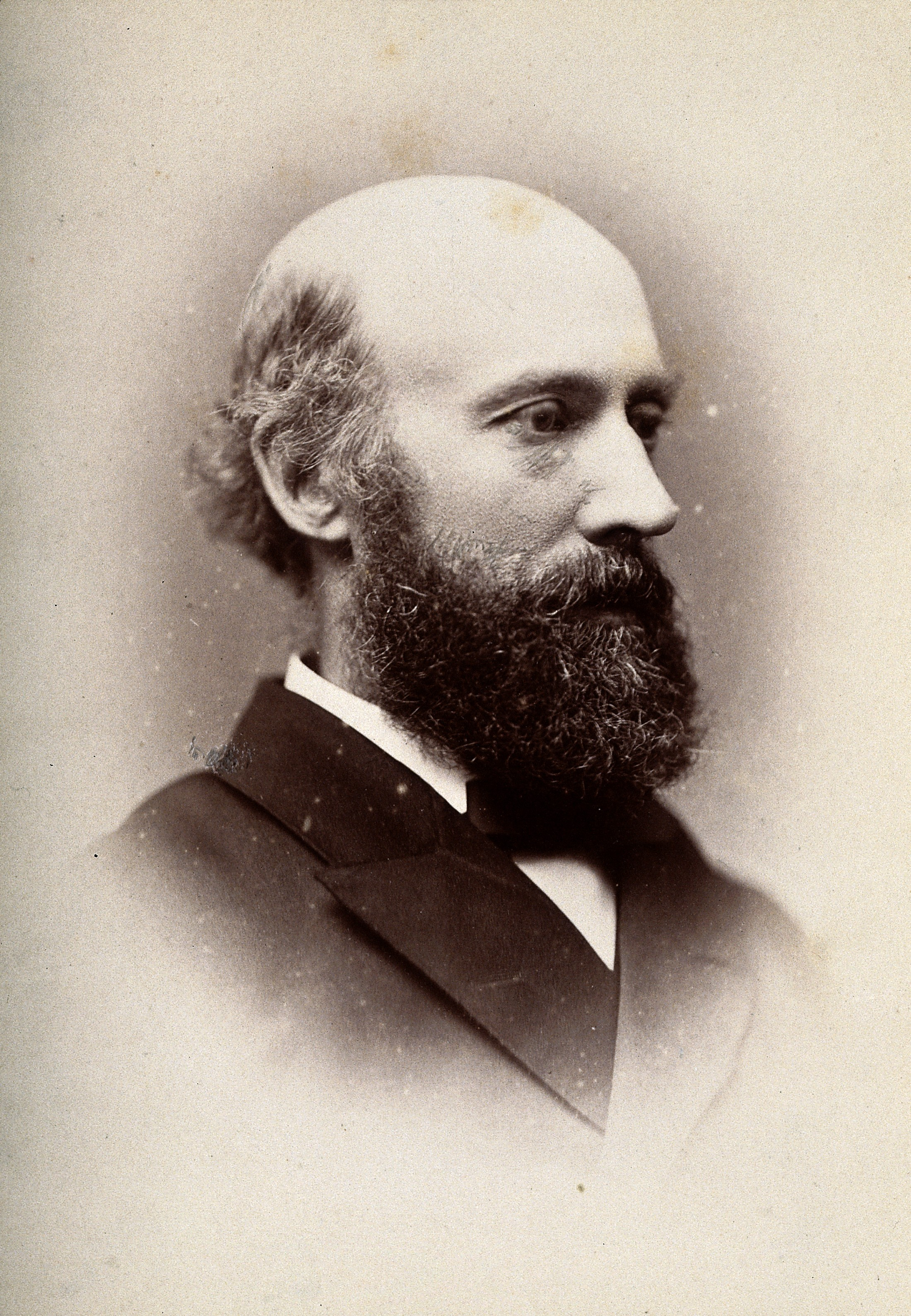
- Robert Liveing; Photograph by G. Jerrard, 1881. Courtesy of Wellcome Trust.
- Born: 30 March 1834; Nayland, Suffolk
- Died: 21 February 1919 (aged 84); London
- Occupations: Physician and dermatologist

Robert Liveing FRCP (1834–1919) was an English physician and pioneer of dermatology.

== Biography ==
Robert Liveing matriculated in 1852 at Christ's College, Cambridge, graduating there BA in 1856, MA in 1860, MB in 1861, and MD in 1865. He received his medical education at King's College, London and at Paris, before receiving his MB (Medicinae Baccalaureus) in 1861 from Cambridge. He qualified MRCP in 1866. In 1861–1862 he held two house appointments (i.e. as assistant physician) at King's College Hospital before joining the staff of Middlesex Hospital, Fitzrovia, London. At Middlesex Hospital he was lecturer on anatomy and physiology from 1862 to 1866, assistant physician from 1866 to 1872, and physician from 1872 to 1876. In 1876 he resigned there as physician (presumably to devote more time to his specialty of dermatology). At Middlesex Hospital he was physician to the skin department from 1879 to 1888, and retired in 1888 to become consulting physician to the skin department.

In 1872, Liveing was elected FRCP (Fellow of the Royal College of Physicians). In 1873 he delivered the Goulstonian Lectures on Elephantiasis Græcorum, or, True Leprosy. His Handbook on skin diseases was a standard text of dermatology in the 1880s and 1890s.

According to the dermatologist Henry Renwick Vickers (1911–1993), the first four appointments of dermatologists to teaching hospitals in the UK were: Sir William Jenner in 1859, Tilbury Fox in 1860, Robert Liveing in 1879, and Sir Malcolm Morris in 1882.

Liveing was a member of the Athenaeum Club and vice-president of the Alpine Club in 1869 and 1870.

== Family ==
Robert Liveing had seven sisters and three brothers, two of whom were Edward Liveing (1832–1919) and George Downing Liveing (1827–1924). On 15 August 1866 in Blendworth, Hampshire, Robert Liveing married Adelaide Mary Dorothea Hawker (1832–1906), a daughter of Admiral Edward Hawker and his first wife Joanna Naomi, née Poore. Robert and Adelaide Liveing had a son, Charles Hawker Liveing (1872–1934), and two daughters, Katherine Edith Liveing (1867–1942, who married Archibald Scott Napier in 1899) and Helen Adelaide Liveing (1870–1893).

== Selected publications ==
=== Articles ===
- "Reports of Medical and Surgical Practice in the Hospitals of Great Britain. Middlesex Hospital. Notes on the treatment of diseases of the skin (Under the care of Dr. Robert Liveing)". Br. Med. J. 2 (463): 534–5. 13 November 1869. doi:10.1136/bmj.2.463.534. PMC 2261121. PMID 20745675.
- Liveing, R. (15 March 1873). "Abstract of the Goulstonian Lectures on Elephantiasis Græcorum". Br. Med. J. 1 (637): 277–281. doi:10.1136/bmj.1.637.277. PMC 2293476.
- Liveing R (30 January 1875). "The treatment of scabies". Br. Med. J. 1 (735): 137. doi:10.1136/bmj.1.735.137-a. PMC 2295399. PMID 20747747.
- Liveing R (19 January 1878). "Clinical observations on maculæa atrophicæ". Br. Med. J. 1 (890): 83–84. doi:10.1136/bmj.1.890.83. PMC 2220710. PMID 20748748.
- Liveing R (12 February 1881). "The treatment of ringworm by croton oil". Br. Med. J. 1 (1050): 227–228. doi:10.1136/bmj.1.1050.227. PMC 2263358. PMID 20749788.

=== Books ===
- Liveing, Robert (1873). Elephantiasis Græcorum, or, True Leprosy.
- A handbook on the diagnosis of skin diseases. 1879.
- A handbook on diseases of the skin : with especial reference to diagnosis and treatment (5th ed.). 1887.
