= Grace Revere Osler =

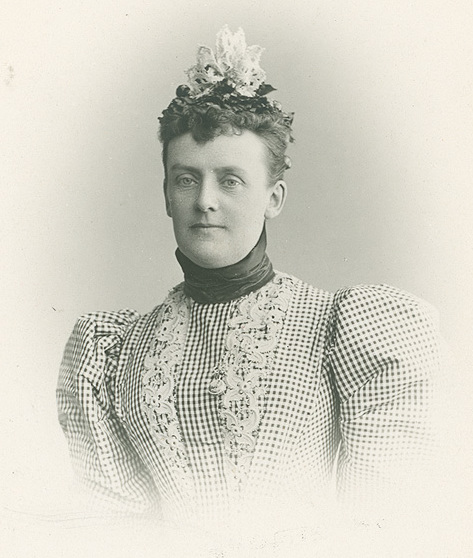
- Grace Revere Osler (Oxford, 1894)
- Born: 1854; Boston
- Died: 1928 (aged 73–74)

Grace Revere Osler (19 June 1854–1928) was an American homemaker and socialite, first the wife of Samuel W. Gross and later of Sir William Osler during his tenure as professor of medicine at Johns Hopkins University. She was widely recognised for the organisation of Osler's domestic life and for her hospitality to successive generations of his students.

== Biography ==
Grave Revere was born in Boston on 19 June 1854, to John Revere, the son of Paul Revere, and Susan Tilden, who would teach her how to run a home and entertain. She attended private schools in Boston, including Miss Foote's School for providing challenging education for young women. At the age of 18 she produced an account of the Great Boston Fire (1872), which was reproduced in 1936 in the Boston Evening Transcript.

She first married Samuel W. Gross, the son of Samuel D. Gross. Her first pregnancy ended in a stillbirth in 1877. On 7 May 1892 she married William Osler in Philadelphia, and the following year gave birth to Paul Revere Osler, who died after one week. On 28 December 1895 she gave birth to Edward Revere Osler (1895–1917).

She was widely recognised for the organisation of Osler's domestic life and for her hospitality to successive generations of his students.

In 1907 she moved to 13 Norham Gardens, Oxford, a house that later became known as "Open Arms". There she was known to entertain visitors, among them Rudyard Kipling and Mark Twain.

== Gallery ==
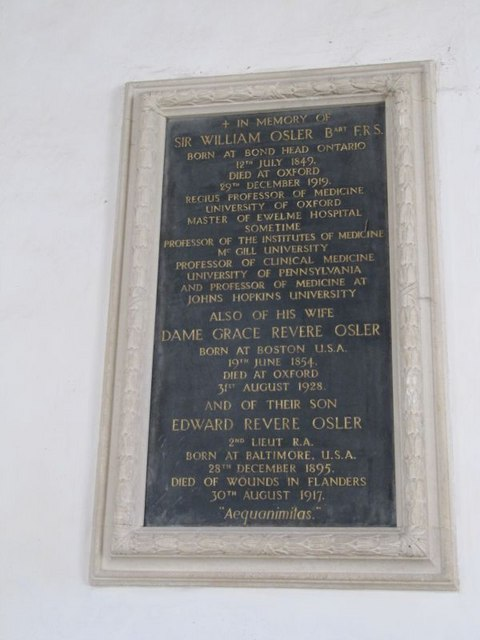
Memorial plaque

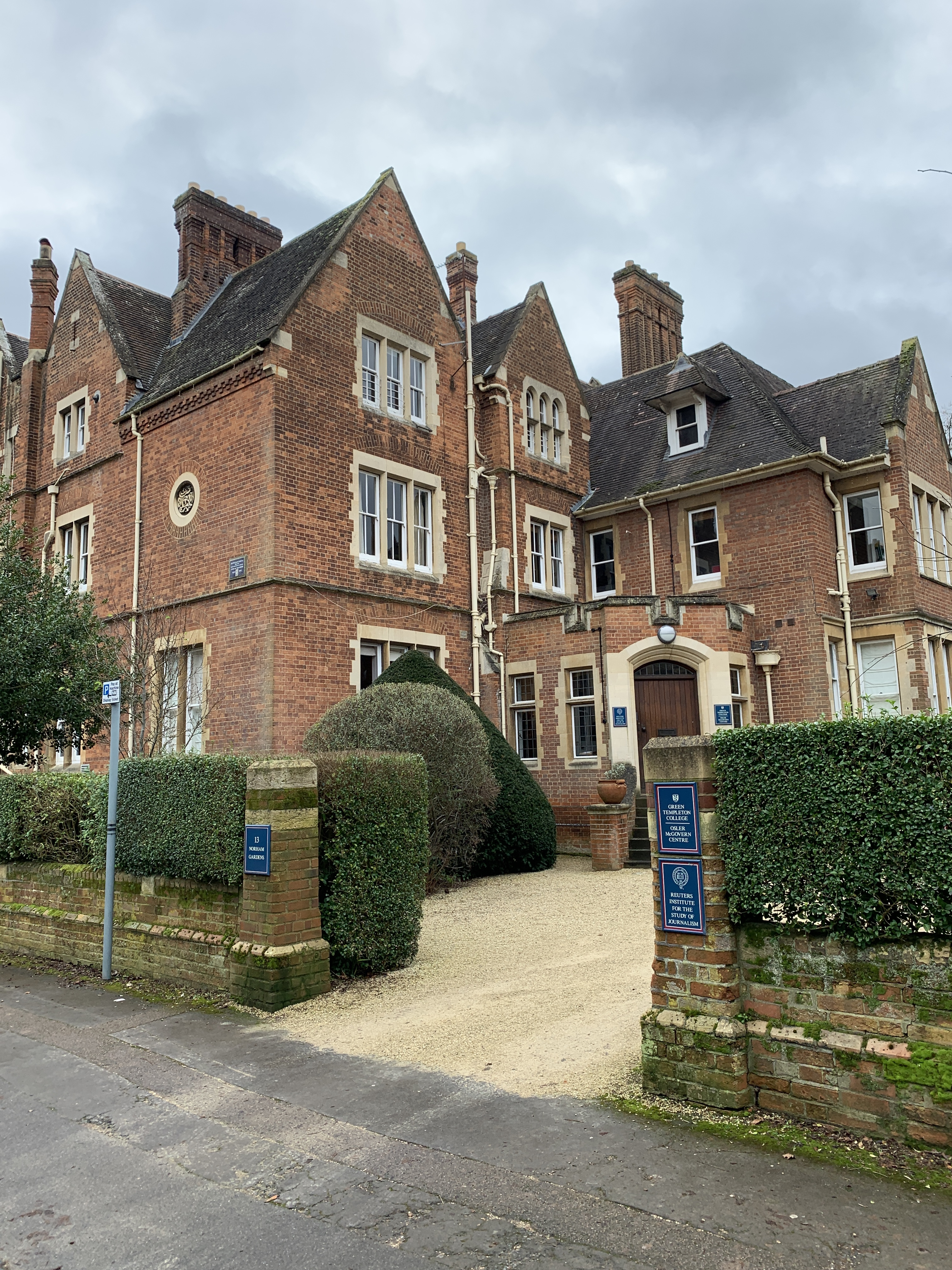
13 Norham Gardens

== Bibliography ==
- Bryan, Charles S., ed. (2020). Sir William Osler: an encyclopedia (First ed.). Novato, California: Norman Publishing History of Science.com in association with the American Osler Society. ISBN 978-0-930405-91-5.
