= Trinity College School =

Location
- 55 Deblaquire Street North; Port Hope, Ontario, L1A 4K7; Canada; 43.9616°N 78.2863°W

Information
- School type: Independent boarding and day
- Motto: Beati mundo corde (Blessed are the pure in heart)
- Religious affiliation: Anglican
- Founded: 1865
- Headmaster: Stuart Grainger
- Grades: 5 to 12
- Enrollment: 600
- Language: English
- Campus: 100 acres (0.40 km^{2}); rural
- Colours: Black, Maroon and White
- Mascot: Trina the Polar Bear
- Team name: Bears
- Rival: Lakefield College School
- Website: www.tcs.on.ca

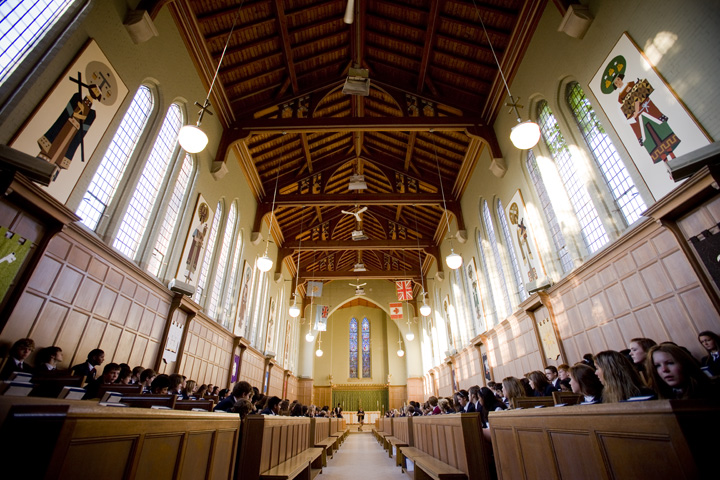

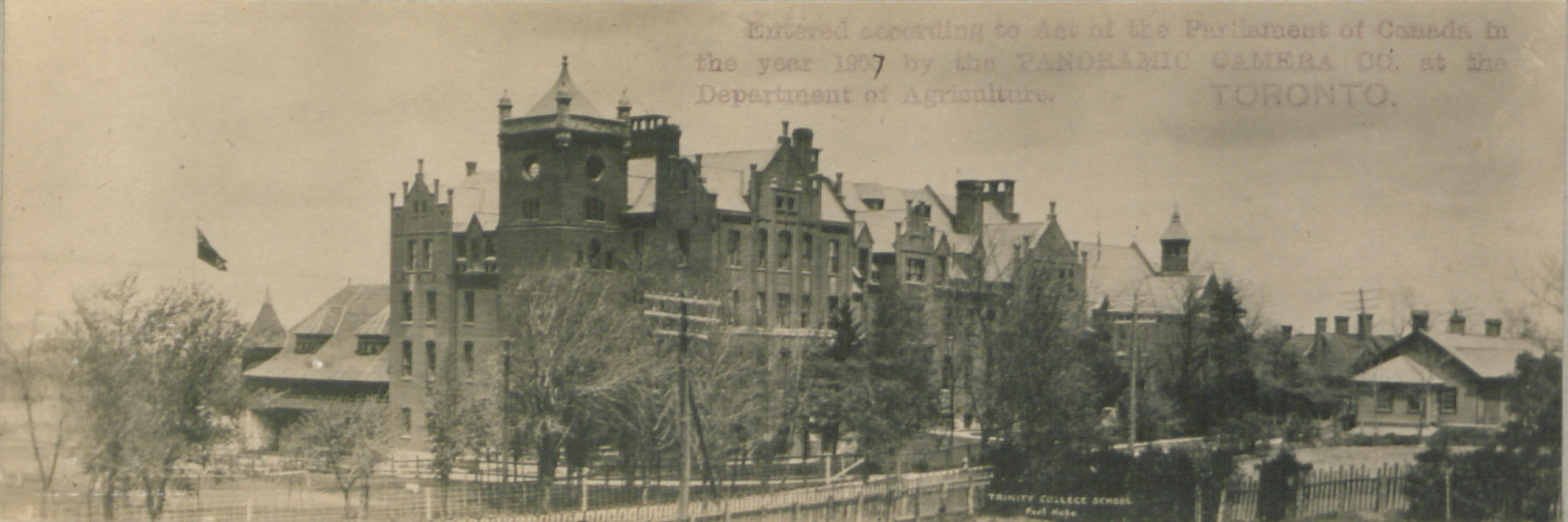

Trinity College School (TCS) is an independent boarding and day school located on a 100-acre campus in Port Hope, Ontario, Canada, one hour's drive east of Toronto. TCS was founded on May 1, 1865. The School consists of a Senior School for Grades 9-12, with approximately 500 students, 60% of whom are boarders, and a Junior School for Grades 5-8, with just over 100 day students.

== Houses ==
The Senior School runs on a house system. Each of the ten houses is named after a former headmaster or other notable member of the school community. Although TCS is co-educational, both boarding and day houses are single-sex.

There are six boarding houses: Bickle, Bethune, Brent, Burns, Ketchum, Scott; and four day houses: Hodgetts, Rigby, Orchard and Wright.

Girls Houses
	Name	House Colour
Day	Wright	Purple
	Rigby	Yellow
Boarding	Burns	Red
	Scott	Green
	Ketchum	Navy Blue

Boys Houses
	Name	House Colour
Day	Orchard	Orange
	Hodgetts	White
Boarding	Bickle	Black
	Bethune	Blue
	Brent	Grey

== History ==
Trinity College School was founded in the town of Weston, Ontario, by the Rev'd William Arthur Johnson who opened the school in his home on May 1, 1865. The school was located in the rectory above the Old Mill (Weston) on the east bank of the Humber River north of Lawrence Avenue (then called Dufferin Street). At the time there were only nine students and teaching staff. More and more people became interested in the school leading to its expansion. At first, the school was moved to a building at the north-west corner of Rosemount Avenue and King Street in Weston. Since a larger structure was needed, sites at Guelph, Whitby, Niagara, and Thorold were considered.

However, prominent citizens in Port Hope, Ontario, were very much interested in hosting the school in their town. They offered to pay the rent for the School's premises for three years, a deal which was accepted. In September 1868 Trinity College School opened in Port Hope. The following 30 years were good ones for the School. During that time, under the direction of Headmaster Charles Bethune, Trinity College School grew from the motley collection of wooden sheds and buildings which existed initially at the site in Port Hope into a prosperous, thriving academic community.

Unfortunately, on a wintry night in 1895 an explosion of a coal oil lamp in one of the master's rooms started a fire which destroyed almost the entire School. Fortunately, no one was hurt and the School was rebuilt in only eight months.

Architect James Augustus Ellis designed the TCS hockey rink built on Ward Street.

A second fire occurred in 1928. Again, virtually the whole School was destroyed. Rebuilding it was not an easy task this time. Although TCS had received promises of funds to help with the rebuilding from the Old Boy community, on the heels of the fire came the Great Depression and many Old Boys had to renege on their promises.

Newly appointed Headmaster Philip Ketchum found himself in charge of a school on the brink of bankruptcy. He had to spend the first few years of his tenure "cap in hand" trying to raise the funds to pay off a very onerous mortgage. Through the generosity of a handful of Old Boys, the debt was finally retired.

Since that time, Trinity College School has not experienced similar hardships. The School's physical plant has tripled in size, the student body has doubled and, under the leadership of Headmaster Rodger Wright, the first female student was admitted to TCS in the fall of 1991.

In 1965 the Centennial Gates were unveiled with iron gates (the stone portion remains at what is now Trinity Bellwoods Park) donated by the Seagram family from the Trinity College in Toronto.

During the summer of 1997, the entire campus was wired to make the School's computer network, and the Internet, universally accessible.

In 2002, the creation of a new arts facility, featuring music and dance studios, MIDI labs, classroom space, and a theatre, put a renewed focus on the arts at TCS. In 2003–2004, the science department opened two new facilities, the electron microscopy suite and the Anne Currie Observatory, which houses a high-powered telescope.

In September 2004, TCS welcomed its 11th headmaster, Stuart K. C. Grainger. Among the achievements under his leadership are the launch of the School's first official strategic plan in 2007, including a performance space; and the construction of a visual arts wing for the 2011–2012 academic year.

== Present ==
The academic school year at TCS is divided into three distinct terms (Fall, Winter and Spring), and different extracurricular programmes are offered during each. Extracurricular activities at the school include athletics, arts and music, and community service. A recreational sports programme is also available, allowing students the opportunity to participate in a non-competitive sports environment.

== Nicknames, mottos and traditions ==
The TCS athletics teams have been known since the 1980s as the Bears.

The school motto is Beati Mundo Corde, Latin for "Blessed are the Pure in Heart." TCS is known as “the school on the hill” due to its location. The school sports colours are black and maroon but the school's uniform and coat of arms incorporate the school's corporate colour of blue.

=== All Student Fun and Games Day ===
One of the most anticipated events of the TCS year is the All Student Fun and Games Day, fondly known as Ruckus. At the beginning of every school year, students attend Ruckus to get to know their fellow housemates and create new and lasting friendships. Students are required to wear house clothing for this event, as each house must set up and maintain a station where new students participate in activities. The gates are closed and prefects and heads of house ceremoniously open the gates of TCS to new students to welcome them to its community. The new students are then instructed to run across campus to the mud pits, which are run by student officials. All students are encouraged to take part in this event, it is considered by many to be one of the school's most beloved traditions.

==== Oxford Cup ====
In November of each year, the school holds one of its oldest traditions known as the Oxford Cup. This is a five kilometre race that utilises the school's cross country trail. Many alumni, and parents come to the school to participate in this event. The Oxford Cup is one of the oldest races in North America, second only to the Boston Marathon.

==== Skate Days ====
The Winter tradition Skate Day consists of school Prefects relieving students from their classes to enjoy a half day of classes, and an afternoon of skating at the Peter Campbell Memorial Rink. Prefects run through the school's corridors banging on walls and classroom doors hollering "Skate Day!" alerting students that they are now allowed to exit their classes and participate in the day's activities. Skate days are considered surprise events: the students are aware they will take place but are not informed exactly when they will occur.

==== Week Without Walls ====
Initiated in 2009, Week Without Walls is hosted to implore students to give back to their community and to the global community. The goal of Week Without Walls is to reflect the school's mission statement "developing habits of the heart and mind for a life of purpose and service". TCS offers 50 initiatives to take part in; all active TCS students and faculty are required to participate. Options range from volunteering at a local Donkey Sanctuary or other local causes to traveling to Jamaica or Ecuador to work with Free the Children or Jamaican Self Help.

==== Carol Service ====
Every year in December before Christmas break, the whole school community gathers for a Christmas Carol Service in the chapel.

== Athletics ==
TCS participates in 19 competitive interschool sports, including: soccer, volleyball, basketball, hockey, rugby, harriers, track and field, swimming, baseball/softball, cricket, field hockey, football, golf, Nordic skiing, rowing and racquet sports (badminton, tennis and squash). Teams compete in the CISAA (Conference of Independent Schools of Ontario Athletic Association) league and senior teams vie to participate at the OFSAA (Ontario Federation of School Athletic Associations) provincial championships.

The school mascot is Trina the Polar Bear and teams compete under the name "Bears". The school fields Bigside (senior), Middleside (senior second team), Littleside (junior) teams as well as Under-14 and Under-12 teams.

TCS has five gymnasiums, an indoor swimming pool, ergonomic rowing room, indoor ice rink, squash courts and an exercise/weight room facility in addition to many outdoor sports fields, a tennis centre and a five kilometre cross-country running trail. In 2017, the Arnold Massey '55 Athletic Centre, a 40,000 square foot facility was opened on campus. This included three new gymnasiums, a new athletic therapy clinic, a cardio and resistance training facility, two additional squash courts, and change rooms, storage, and classrooms.

The home playing field of the TCS Bears' is the Tim Hay Field.

== Arts ==
TCS has academic art programs including music (vocal and instrumental), drama and visual arts. The school also has extracurricular programmes in music (vocal and instrumental), drama, improv, visual arts, literary arts and dance. All students participate in the intraschool House Debates programme, and TCS is a member of the Fulford Debate League. Arts facilities at TCS include LeVan Hall, completed in 2002, which includes music rooms and studios, MIDI composing labs, the R. Samuel McLaughlin Gallery for art, a drama and dance studio and a performance theatre which was upgraded in 2009. In 2011 the school opened a new visual arts wing including two studios, classrooms and offices.

== Headmasters of TCS ==
Headmaster	Years
Rev. Charles H. Badgley	1865–1870
Rev. Charles J. S. Bethune	1870–1891, 1893–1899
Rev. Arthur Lloyd	1891–1893
Rev. R. E. Jones	1899–1901
Rev. Herbert Symonds	1901–1903
Rev. Oswald Rigby	1903–1913
Rev. Graham Orchard	1913–1933
Dr. Philip A. C. Ketchum	1933–1962
Angus C. Scott	1962–1983
Rodger C. N. Wright	1983–2004
Stuart Grainger	2004–present

== Notable alumni ==
Among its notable alumni are Ian Binnie, William Bridges, Edgar Bronfman Sr., Ian Brown, Lew Cirne, Reginald Fessenden, Roy Heenan, Peter Jennings, John Labatt, Archibald Lampman, Archibald Cameron Macdonell, Yann Martel, Mark McKinney, David Macfarlane, Sir William Osler, Peter Raymont, Godfrey D. Rhodes, Casimir Cartwright van Straubenzee, Charles Taylor, Cal Quantrill, Robert Whitehead and Lindsey Deluce. Conrad Black lasted less than a year when he attended Trinity College School before being expelled for insubordinate behaviour.

- David Piccini (born 1988), politician, Ontario’s Minister of Labour, Immigration, Training & Skills Development

== Bibliography ==
- Trinity College School (Port Hope., Ont.). Old Boys' Association (1948). Trinity College School Old Boys at war, 1899–1902, 1914–1918, 1939–1945. Port Hope.
- Trinity College School (Port Hope., Ont.). Old Boys' Association (1947). Trinity College School Record October 1946 – August 1947. Port Hope.
- Trinity College School (Port Hope, Ont.). Humble, A.H. (1965). The School on the Hill: Trinity College School, 1865–1965. Port Hope.
