= Medical Library Association of Great Britain and Ireland =

The Medical Library Association of Great Britain and Ireland was founded in 1908 and held two annual meetings. Its first formal meeting was held in Belfast in July 1909 (during the meetings of the British Medical Association) and its second, in London, in 1910 (also in conjunction with the meetings of the British Medical Association.) No written record of its activities after 1911 has been found.

William Osler was one of the founders, in 1898, of the Medical Library Association in North America (initially called the Association of Medical Librarians) and served as its President from 1901-04. Osler moved to England in 1905 as he had been appointed Regius Professor of Medicine at Oxford University. Shortly after his arrival he was also involved in the formation of the short-lived British equivalent and he was elected the new Association's President in 1909.

The proceedings of the Association's 1909 meeting were published as a separate publication and are the first eight pages of Volume 1 of the Proceedings of the Medical Library Association of Great Britain and Ireland. A copy of this publication is in the Osler Library of McGill University in Montreal where Part 1 is Osler 7206. Part 2 of Volume 1 (pp. 9–19) is the Presidential Address by William Osler (Osler 3576 No. 286). Osler's Presidential Address - entitled "The medical library in post-graduate work" - was originally published in the British Medical Journal, October 2, 1909, pp. 925–8. No further issues of the Proceedings were published.

It appears that the Osler Library copy of the Proceedings of the MLA-GBI may be a final proof copy as it contains proof-reader's corrections but, to date, no other copy has been found for comparison. A copy of these Proceedings is at
