= Niagara, Ontario =

Niagara, Ontario may refer to:

- Niagara-on-the-Lake, formerly called Niagara, a town that was at the mouth of the Niagara River
- Niagara Falls, Ontario, a city located adjacent to Niagara Falls
- Niagara Peninsula, a peninsula located between Lake Ontario and Lake Erie
- Regional Municipality of Niagara, also called Niagara Region, a regional municipality located on the Niagara Peninsula

== See also ==
- Niagara (disambiguation)
