= Ralph Siegel (scientist) =

Ralph M. Siegel
- Born: 1958
- Died: 2011 (aged 52–53)
- Known for: Behaving monkey neurophysiology, optical imaging
- Scientific career
- Institutions: Rutgers University

Ralph Mitchell Siegel, a researcher who studied the neurological underpinnings of vision, was a professor of neuroscience at Rutgers University, Newark, in the Center for Molecular and Behavioral Neuroscience. He died September 2, 2011, at his home following a long illness.

Siegel, a neurophysiologist, was interested in the basic mechanisms underlying visual motion and spatial perception, with the ultimate goal of developing applications to assist people who have visual processing disorders and neurological injuries. He performed pioneering work on parietal neurons and the influence of eye position and attention on perception. His laboratory became the first to perform optical imaging of parietal cortex in behaving non-human primates.

== Biography ==
Siegel earned his B.S. in physics and his Ph.D. in physiology from McGill University in Montreal. Ralph's 1984 Ph.D. thesis in the lab of Richard I. Birks revealed astonishingly large and long-lasting potassium conductance and sodium pump driven voltage changes that occur following bursts of action potentials in thin axons that model presynaptic nerve terminals. After completing his graduate studies at McGill on theoretical neuroscience of spiking behaviour in neural dendrites, Ralph moved to the Salk Institute where he began to focus on in vivo, behavioral neurophysiology of monkeys. Ralph was at the forefront of experimental studies to understand the neurophysiology of cognitive processes in primates in the early 1980s. He was a co-discoverer of the gain-field mechanisms of neuronal population encoding, and employed precise psychophysical methods to understand visual motion perception at the level of neuronal activity.

In 1987 Ralph began a postdoctoral position in the laboratory of Nobel Prize winner, Torsten Wiesel, at Rockefeller University. While at Rockefeller, Ralph nurtured a latent interest in theoretical studies of cortical visual processing and the rapidly emerging field of optical imaging of cortex, through collaboration with a pioneering group led by Amiram Grinvald. Ralph then moved to the lab of Richard Andersen at the Salk Institute as a postdoctoral fellow where became a co-discoverer of the gain-field mechanisms of neuronal population encoding, and began the work that he continued throughout his career in employing precise psychophysical and physiological methods to understand visual motion perception at the level of neuronal activity.

In 1991 Ralph moved to the newly established Rutgers Center for Molecular and Behavioral Neuroscience where he was on the faculty for the remainder of his career. Ralph maintained his scientific collaborations with his former colleagues at the Salk Institute, making annual summer visits to La Jolla. During this period, he continued his pioneering neurophysiological and behavioral work on the organization and functions of visual cortex in the parietal lobe and continued to develop the use of optical microscopic techniques to monitor neuronal activity in the cerebral cortex. In collaboration with the Salk Institute's Ed Callaway (head of the Callaway Lab for the study of the organization and function of cortical circuits) and UC Berkeley's Ehud Isacoff (whom Ralph trained in the Birks lab at McGill, leading to a lasting friendship), Ralph began to develop tools that enabled optical monitoring of activity from neurons in behaving animals.

In 2012 Siegel's first book and memoir, Another Day in the Monkey's Brain, was published, by Oxford University Press, with the help of his lifelong friend and colleague, Dr. Oliver Sacks. Sacks described his interactions with Ralph in his 2005 obituary for Francis Crick and in a video interview and dedicated his 2007 book Musicophilia: Tales of Music and the Brain to Ralph (along with Orrin Devinsky and Connie Tomaino).

Upon his death Ralph Siegel was survived by his wife Jasmine, son Dashiel, daughter Zoe, sister Cheryl, and mother Elaine.

== Selected publications ==
- with R. A. Andersen and G. K. Essick: Andersen, R.; Essick, G.; Siegel, R. (25 Oct 1985). "Encoding of spatial location by posterior parietal neurons". Science. 230 (4724): 456–458. Bibcode:1985Sci...230..456A. doi:10.1126/science.4048942. PMID 4048942.
- with R. A. Andersen and G. K. Essick: Andersen, R.A.; Essick, G.K.; Siegel, R.M. (July 1987). "Neurons of area 7 activated by both visual stimuli and oculomotor behavior". Experimental Brain Research. 67 (2): 316–322. doi:10.1007/BF00248552. PMID 3622691. S2CID 6957713.
- with R. A. Andersen: Siegel, R. M.; Andersen, R. A. (21 January 1988). "Perception of three-dimensional structure from motion in monkey and man". Nature. 331 (6153): 259–261. Bibcode:1988Natur.331..259S. doi:10.1038/331259a0. PMID 3336437. S2CID 8462464.
- Siegel, R.M. (June 1990). "Non-linear dynamical system theory and primary visual cortical processing". Physica D: Nonlinear Phenomena. 42 (1–3): 385–395. Bibcode:1990PhyD...42..385S. doi:10.1016/0167-2789(90)90090-C.
- with R. A. Andersen: Siegel, R. M.; Andersen, R. A. (1990). "The perception of structure from visual motion in monkey and man". Journal of Cognitive Neuroscience. 2 (4): 306–319. doi:10.1162/jocn.1990.2.4.306. PMID 23964757. S2CID 30570526.
- with A. Grinvald, R. D. Frostig, and E. Bartfeld: Grinvald, A.; Frostig, R. D.; Siegel, R. M.; Bartfeld, E. (15 December 1991). "High-resolution optical imaging of functional brain architecture in the awake monkey". Proceedings of the National Academy of Sciences. 88 (24): 11559–11563. Bibcode:1991PNAS...8811559G. doi:10.1073/pnas.88.24.11559. PMC 53175. PMID 1763070.
- with Charles Tresser and George Zettler: Siegel, Ralph M.; Tresser, Charles; Zettler, George (1992). "A decoding problem in dynamics and in number theory". Chaos: An Interdisciplinary Journal of Nonlinear Science. 2 (4): 473–493. Bibcode:1992Chaos...2..473S. doi:10.1063/1.165890. PMID 12779997.
- with Gábor Jandó, Zsolt Horváth, and György Buzsáki: Jandó, Gábor; Siegel, Ralph M.; Horváth, Zsolt; Buzsáki, György (February 1993). "Pattern recognition of the electroencephalogram by artificial neural networks". Electroencephalography and Clinical Neurophysiology. 86 (2): 100–109. doi:10.1016/0013-4694(93)90082-7. PMID 7681377.
- with Heather L. Read: Siegel, Ralph M.; Read, Heather L. (1993). "Models of the temporal dynamics of visual processing". Journal of Statistical Physics. 70 (1–2): 297–308. Bibcode:1993JSP....70..297S. doi:10.1007/BF01053969. S2CID 122682701.
- with Malvin C. Teich and Robert G. Turcott: Teich, M.C.; Turcott, R.G.; Siegel, R.M. (1996). "Temporal correlation in cat striate-cortex neural spike trains". IEEE Engineering in Medicine and Biology Magazine. 15 (5): 79–87. doi:10.1109/51.537063.
- with H. L. Read: Siegel, R. (June 1997). "Analysis of optic flow in the monkey parietal area 7a". Cerebral Cortex. 7 (4): 327–346. doi:10.1093/cercor/7.4.327. PMID 9177764.
- with H. L. Read: Read, H. (1997). "Modulation of responses to optic flow in area 7a by retinotopic and oculomotor cues in monkey". Cerebral Cortex. 7 (7): 647–661. doi:10.1093/cercor/7.7.647. PMID 9373020.
- Siegel, Ralph M. (1998). "Representation of visual space in area 7a neurons using the center of mass equation". Journal of Computational Neuroscience. 5 (4): 365–381. doi:10.1023/A:1008844027878. PMID 9877020. S2CID 1621472.
- with Kathleen C. Anderson: Anderson, Kathleen C.; Siegel, Ralph M. (1999). "Optic flow selectivity in the anterior superior temporal polysensory area, STPa, of the behaving monkey". Journal of Neuroscience. 19 (7): 2681–2692. doi:10.1523/JNEUROSCI.19-07-02681.1999. PMC 6786053. PMID 10087081. S2CID 115378.
- with Raymond E. Phinney: Phinney, R. E.; Siegel, R. M. (2000). "Speed selectivity for optic flow in area 7a of the behaving macaque". Cerebral Cortex. 10 (4): 413–421. doi:10.1093/cercor/10.4.413. PMID 10769251.
- with H. L. Read: Siegel, Ralph M.; Read, Heather L. (2001). "Deterministic dynamics emerging from a cortical functional architecture". Neural Networks. 14 (6–7): 697–713. doi:10.1016/S0893-6080(01)00045-4. PMID 11665764.
- Siegel, Ralph M. (2004). "Choices: The Science of Bela Julesz". PLOS Biology. 2 (6) e172. doi:10.1371/journal.pbio.0020172. PMC 423145. (See Béla Julesz.)
- with Milena Raffi: Raffi, Milena; Siegel, Ralph M. (2004). "Multiple Cortical Representations of Optic Flow Processing". Optic Flow and Beyond. Springer, Dordrecht. pp. 3–22. doi:10.1007/978-1-4020-2092-6_1. ISBN 978-90-481-6589-6.
- with E. M. Callaway: Siegel, Ralph M.; Callaway, Edward M. (14 December 2004). "Francis Crick's Legacy for Neuroscience: Between the α and the Ω". PLOS Biology. 2 (12) e419. doi:10.1371/journal.pbio.0020419. PMC 535570. PMID 17593891.
- with Oliver Sacks: Sacks, Oliver; Siegel, Ralph M. (28 June 2006). "Seeing is believing as brain reveals its adaptability". Nature. 441 (7097): 1048. Bibcode:2006Natur.441Q1048S. doi:10.1038/4411048a. PMID 16810228. S2CID 4405706.
- with Jeng-Ren Duann, Tzyy-Ping Jung, and Terrence Sejnowski: Siegel, R. M.; Duann, J.-R.; Jung, T.-P.; Sejnowski, T. (2006). "Spatiotemporal dynamics of the functional architecture for gain fields in inferior parietal lobule of behaving monkey". Cerebral Cortex. 17 (2): 378–390. doi:10.1093/cercor/bhj155. PMC 1995020. PMID 16603713.
- with Nirmala Ramalingam, Barbara Heider, and Anushree P. Karnik: Ramalingam, Nirmala; Heider, Barbara; Karnik, Anushree P.; Siegel, Ralph Mitchell (2006). "Single-cell electrophysiology in macaque inferior parietal lobule during visually guided reach". The FASEB Journal. 20 (4): A380. doi:10.1096/fasebj.20.4.A380.
- with Milena Raffi: Raffi, Milena; Siegel, Ralph M. (2007). "A functional architecture of optic flow in the inferior parietal lobule of the behaving monkey". PLOS ONE. 2 (2) e200. Bibcode:2007PLoSO...2..200R. doi:10.1371/journal.pone.0000200. PMC 1784069. PMID 17285147.
- with Barbara Heider, Jason L. Nathanson, Ehud Y. Isacoff, and Edward M. Callaway: Heider, Barbara; Nathanson, Jason L.; Isacoff, Ehud Y.; Callaway, Edward M.; Siegel, Ralph M. (4 November 2010). "Two-Photon Imaging of Calcium in Virally Transfected Striate Cortical Neurons of Behaving Monkey". PLOS ONE. 5 (11) e13829. Bibcode:2010PLoSO...513829H. doi:10.1371/journal.pone.0013829. PMC 2973959. PMID 21079806.
- with Kurt F. Ahrens, Barbara Heider, Hanson Lee, and Ehud Y. Isacoff: Ahrens, Kurt F.; Heider, Barbara; Lee, Hanson; Isacoff, Ehud Y.; Siegel, Ralph M. (22 March 2012). "Two-photon scanning microscopy of in vivo sensory responses of cortical neurons genetically encoded with a fluorescent voltage sensor in rat". Frontiers in Neural Circuits. 6: 15. doi:10.3389/fncir.2012.00015. PMC 3310150. PMID 22461770.
