= Pseudohypertension =

Pseudohypertension, also known as pseudohypertension in the elderly, noncompressibility artery syndrome, and Osler's sign (or Osler sign) of pseudohypertension is a falsely elevated blood pressure reading obtained through sphygmomanometry due to calcification of blood vessels which cannot be compressed. There is normal blood pressure when it is measured from within the artery. This condition however is associated with significant cardiovascular disease risk.

Because the stiffened arterial walls of arteriosclerosis do not compress with pressure normally, the blood pressure reading is theoretically higher than the true intra-arterial measurement.

To perform the test (also named Osler maneuver), Inflate BP cuff above SBP (detected by loss of pulse with auscultation). Osler maneuver is positive when either brachial or radial artery remains palpable despite loss of pulse by auscultation.

It occurs frequently in the elderly irrespective of them being hypertensive, and has moderate to modest intraobserver and interobserver agreement. It is also known as "Osler's maneuver".

The sign is named for William Osler.

Osler sign occurs due to Monckeberg's sclerosis of arteries. Unlike atherosclerotic change in the intimal layer of arterial lumen, It is the calcification in the media of small or mediate-size arteries within four limbs. Sometimes it also affects renal and coronary arteries. On X-ray, it shows "rail-tracking" appearance. Clinically, pseudohypertension should be considered once one develops dizziness without lowering blood pressure after they start or escalates antihypertensive agents.
