= William Osler =

Canadian physician and co-founder of Johns Hopkins Hospital (1849–1919)

Sir William Osler Bt FRS FRCP
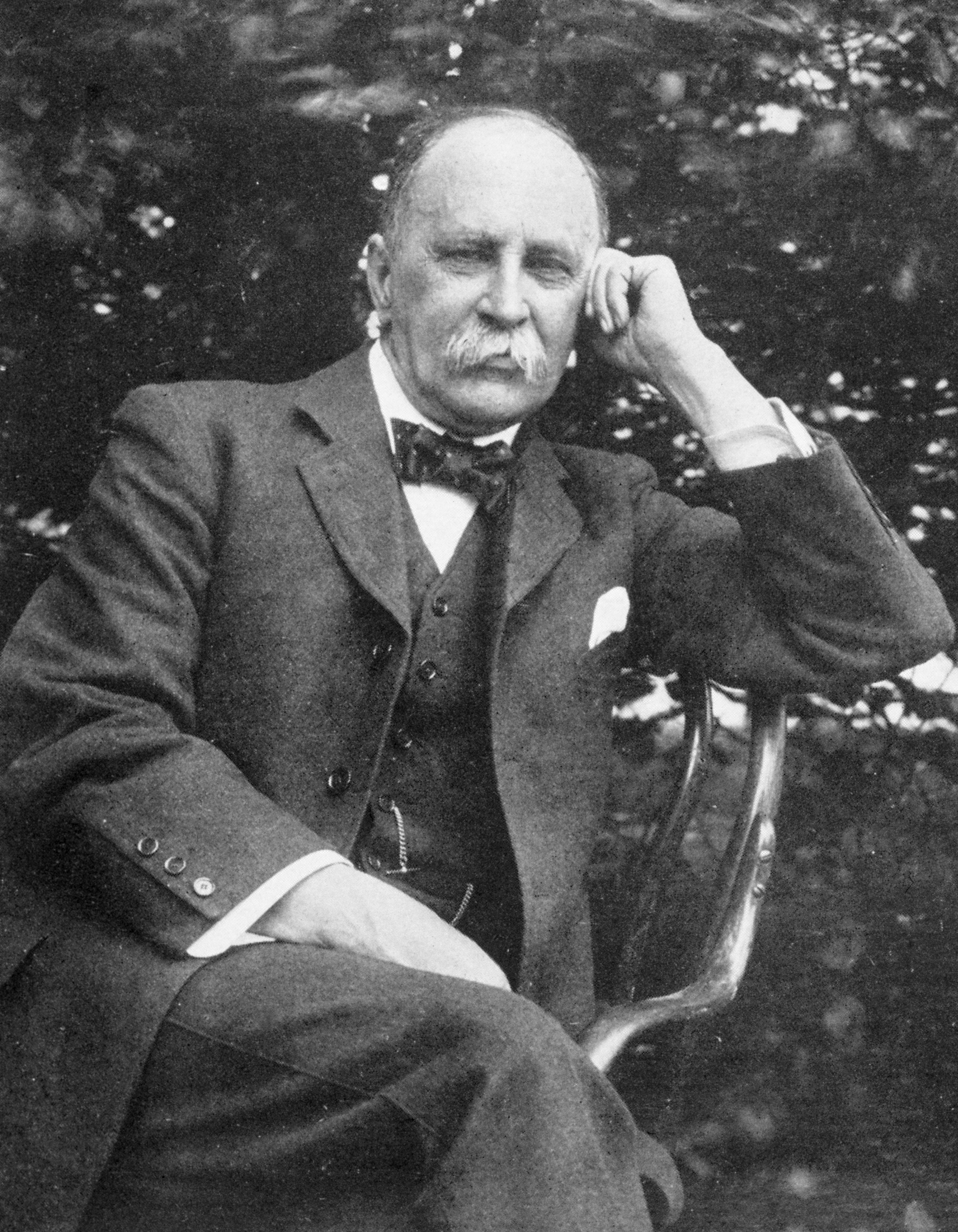
- Photograph of Osler, c. 1912
- Born: July 12, 1849; Bond Head, Canada West
- Died: December 29, 1919 (aged 70); Oxford, England
- Education: McGill University (MDCM)
- Known for: Co-founding physician of Johns Hopkins Hospital
- Spouse: Grace Revere
- Children: 2 sons
- Scientific career
- Fields: Physician, pathologist, internist, educator, bibliophile, author and historian
- Workplaces: McGill University; Johns Hopkins University School of Medicine; Johns Hopkins Hospital; University of Pennsylvania; University of Oxford

Signature
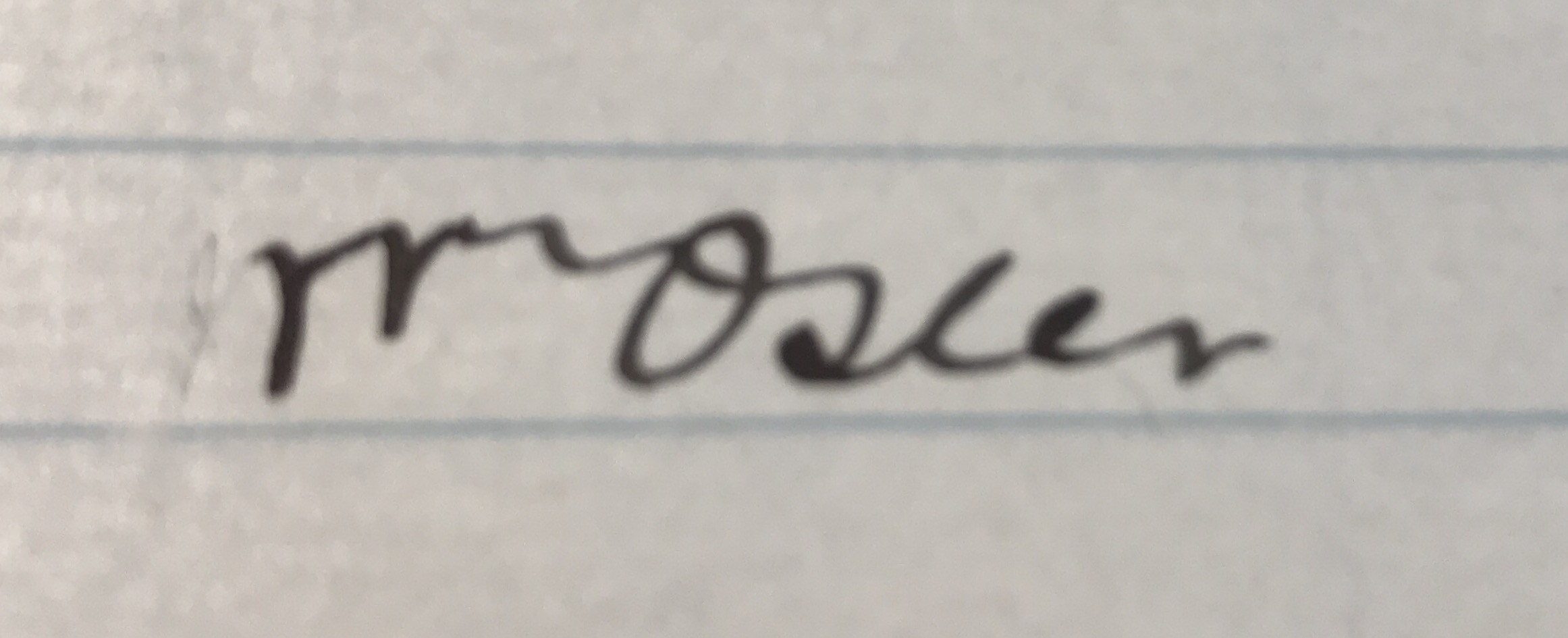

Sir William Osler, 1st Baronet (/ˈɒzlər/; July 12, 1849 – December 29, 1919) was a Canadian physician and one of the "Big Four" founding professors of Johns Hopkins Hospital. Osler created the first residency program for specialty training of physicians. He has frequently been described as the Father of Modern Medicine and one of the "greatest diagnosticians ever to wield a stethoscope". In addition to being a physician he was a bibliophile, historian, author, and renowned practical joker. He was passionate about medical libraries and medical history, having founded the History of Medicine Society (formally "section"), at the Royal Society of Medicine, London. He was also instrumental in founding the Medical Library Association of Great Britain and Ireland, and the (North American) Association of Medical Librarians (later the Medical Library Association) along with three other people, including Margaret Charlton, the medical librarian of his alma mater, McGill University. He left his own large history of medicine library to McGill, where it became the Osler Library.

== Biography ==
=== Family ===
William Osler's great-grandfather, Edward Osler, was variously described as either a merchant seaman or a pirate. One of William's uncles, Edward Osler (1798–1863), a medical officer in the Royal Navy, wrote the Life of Lord Exmouth and the poem The Voyage.

William Osler's father, the Reverend Featherstone Lake Osler (1805–1895), the son of a shipowner at Falmouth, Cornwall, was a former lieutenant in the Royal Navy who served on HMS Victory. In 1831, Featherstone Osler was invited to serve on HMS Beagle as the science officer for Charles Darwin's historic voyage to the Galápagos Islands, but he turned it down because his father was dying. In 1833, Featherstone Osler announced that he wanted to become a minister of the Church of England.

As a teenager, Featherstone Osler was aboard HMS Sappho when it was nearly destroyed by Atlantic storms and remained adrift for weeks. Serving in the Navy, he was shipwrecked off Barbados. In 1837, Featherstone Osler retired from the Navy and emigrated to Canada, becoming a "saddle-bag minister" in rural Upper Canada. When Featherstone and his bride, Ellen Free Picton, arrived in Canada, they were nearly shipwrecked again on Egg Island in the Gulf of Saint Lawrence. Their children included William, Britton Bath Osler and Sir Edmund Boyd Osler.

=== Early life ===
William Osler was born in Bond Head, Canada West (Ontario), on July 12, 1849, and raised after 1857 in Dundas, Ontario. He was named William after William of Orange, who won the Battle of the Boyne on July 12, 1690. Osler's mother, who was very religious, prayed that he would become a priest. Osler was educated at Trinity College School (then located in Weston, Ontario).

In 1867, Osler announced that he would follow his father's footsteps into the ministry and entered Trinity College of the University of Toronto, in the autumn. However, he became increasingly interested in medical science under the influence of James Bovell and the Rev. William Arthur Johnson, encouraging him to switch his career.

In 1868, Osler enrolled in the Toronto School of Medicine, a privately owned institution that was not part of the Medical Faculty of the University of Toronto. Osler lived with James Bovell for a time, and through Johnson, he was introduced to the writings of Sir Thomas Browne; his Religio Medici caused a deep impression on him.

Osler left the Toronto School of Medicine after being accepted into the MDCM program at the McGill University Faculty of Medicine in Montreal in 1870. Osler received his medical degree (MDCM) in 1872.

While studying at McGill, Osler lived on lower Saint Urbain Street, at a time when the medical school was on nearby Côté Street. While in Montreal, Osler, who was a practicing Anglican regularly attended the "free seat" Chapel of St. John the Evangelist which at the time was located on Dorchester Street (now René Lévesque Boulevard). Osler held the chapel's rector, Fr. Edmund Wood in high regard due to his care for the less fortunate. Osler had personal copies of the 1662 Book of Common Prayer and Hymns Ancient and Modern, both of which are kept in the Osler Library of the History of Medicine at McGill. Osler and Fr. Wood would later on contribute to the installation of a memorial stained glass window in honour of Rev. Dr. William Wright, a professor of Materia medica at the McGill Faculty of Medicine and also a long time associate priest at the Church of St. John the Evangelist, which had since built a new church building on Ontario Street (now President Kennedy Avenue) and Saint Urbain, a few blocks north of the chapel's former location.

=== Career ===
Following post-graduate training under Rudolf Virchow in Germany, Osler returned to the McGill University Faculty of Medicine as a professor in 1874. There he created the first formal journal club, showed interest in comparative pathology, and is considered the first to have taught veterinary pathology in North America as part of a broad understanding of disease pathogenesis. In 1884, he was appointed Chair of Clinical Medicine at the University of Pennsylvania in Philadelphia and in 1885, was one of the seven founding members of the Association of American Physicians, a society dedicated to "the advancement of scientific and practical medicine." When he left Philadelphia in 1889, his farewell address, "Aequanimitas", was about the imperturbability (calm amid storm) and equanimity (moderated emotion, tolerance) necessary for physicians.

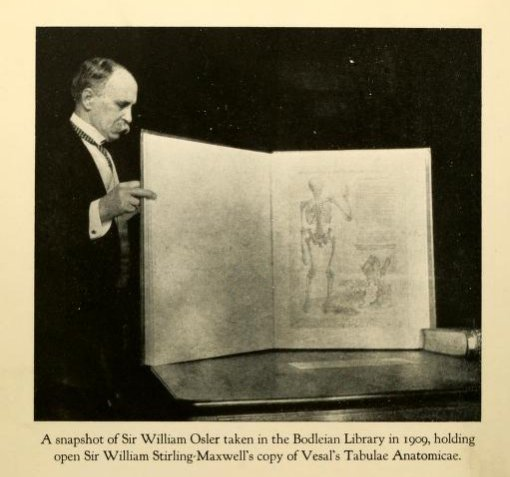
Osler in 1909, at the Bodleian Library, Oxford, holding Sir William Stirling Maxwell's copy of Vesalius's Tabulae Anatomicae

In 1889, he became the first Physician-in-Chief of the new Johns Hopkins Hospital in Baltimore, Maryland. In 1893, Osler was instrumental in creating the Johns Hopkins School of Medicine and became one of the school's first professors of medicine. Osler quickly enhanced his reputation as a clinician, humanitarian, and teacher. He presided over the rapidly expanding hospital's first year of operation, when it had 220 beds and 788 patients were seen for a total of over 15,000 days of treatment. Sixteen years later, when Osler left for Oxford, over 4,200 patients were seen for a total of nearly 110,000 days of treatment.

In 1905, he was appointed Regius Professor of Medicine at Oxford, a position which he held until his death. He was also a Student (fellow) of Christ Church, Oxford.

In the UK, he initiated the founding in 1907 of the Association of Physicians and was founding Senior Editor of its publication the Quarterly Journal of Medicine until his death.

In 1911, he founded the Postgraduate Medical Association and was its first President. The same year, Osler was named a baronet in the Coronation Honours List for his contributions to the field of medicine.

In January 1919 he was appointed President of the Fellowship of Medicine and was in October appointed founding President of the merged Fellowship of Medicine and Postgraduate Medical Association, which became the Fellowship of Postgraduate Medicine.

The largest collection of Osler's letters and papers is at the Osler Library of McGill University in Montreal and a collection is also held at the United States National Library of Medicine in Bethesda, Maryland.

== Assessment ==
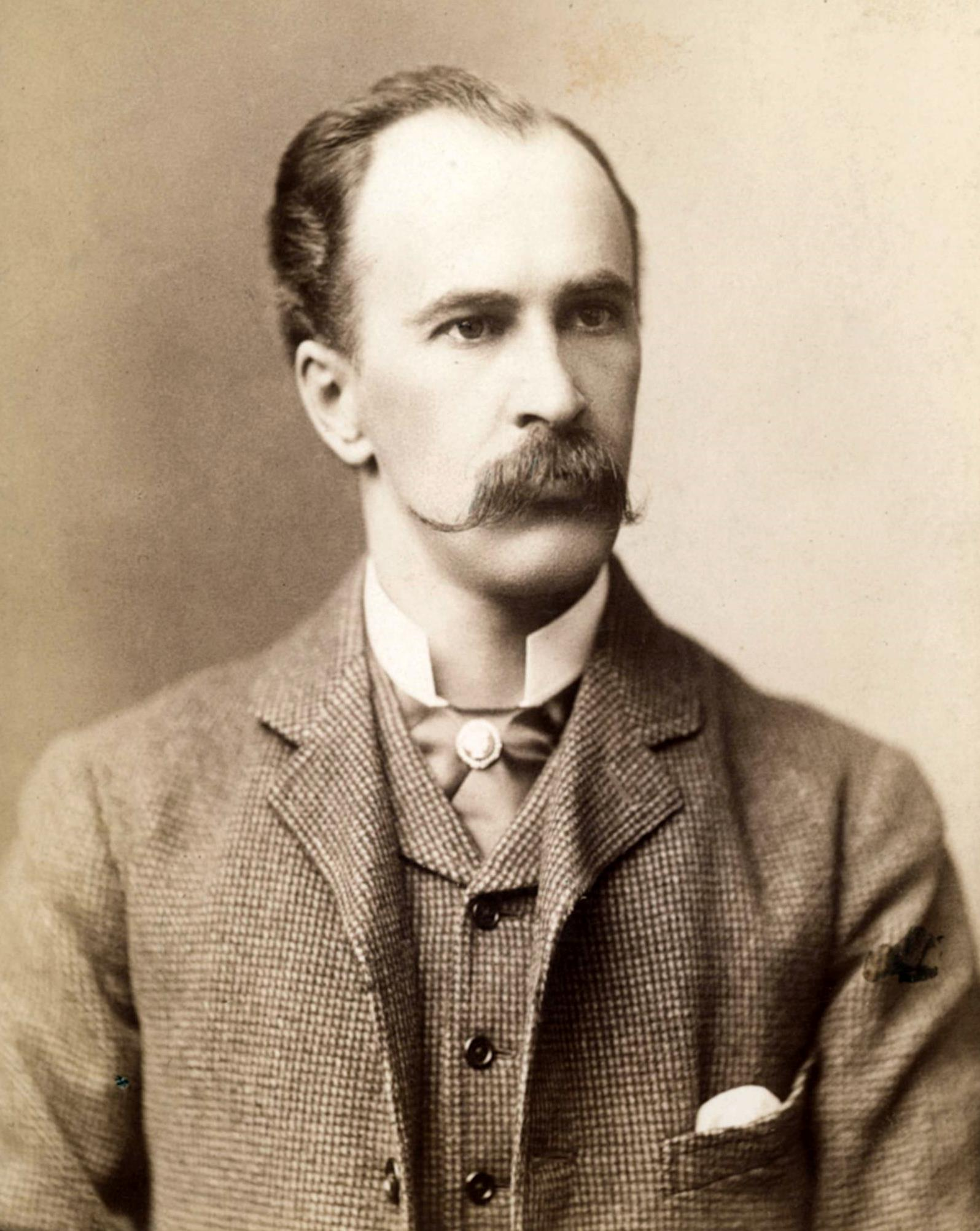
Osler c. 1880

Osler insisted that students learn from seeing and talking to patients. He established medical residency, an idea that spread across the English-speaking world. Physicians spent as long as seven or eight years as residents, during which time they led a restricted life. He introduced clinical clerkship – having third- and fourth-year students work with patients on the wards. He pioneered the practice of bedside teaching, making rounds with a handful of students; soon after arriving in Baltimore, Osler insisted that his medical students attend at bedside early in their training.

He wrote in an essay, "Books and Men", that "He who studies medicine without books sails an uncharted sea, but he who studies medicine without patients does not go to sea at all." His best-known saying was "Listen to your patient—he is telling you the diagnosis", which emphasises the importance of taking a good history.

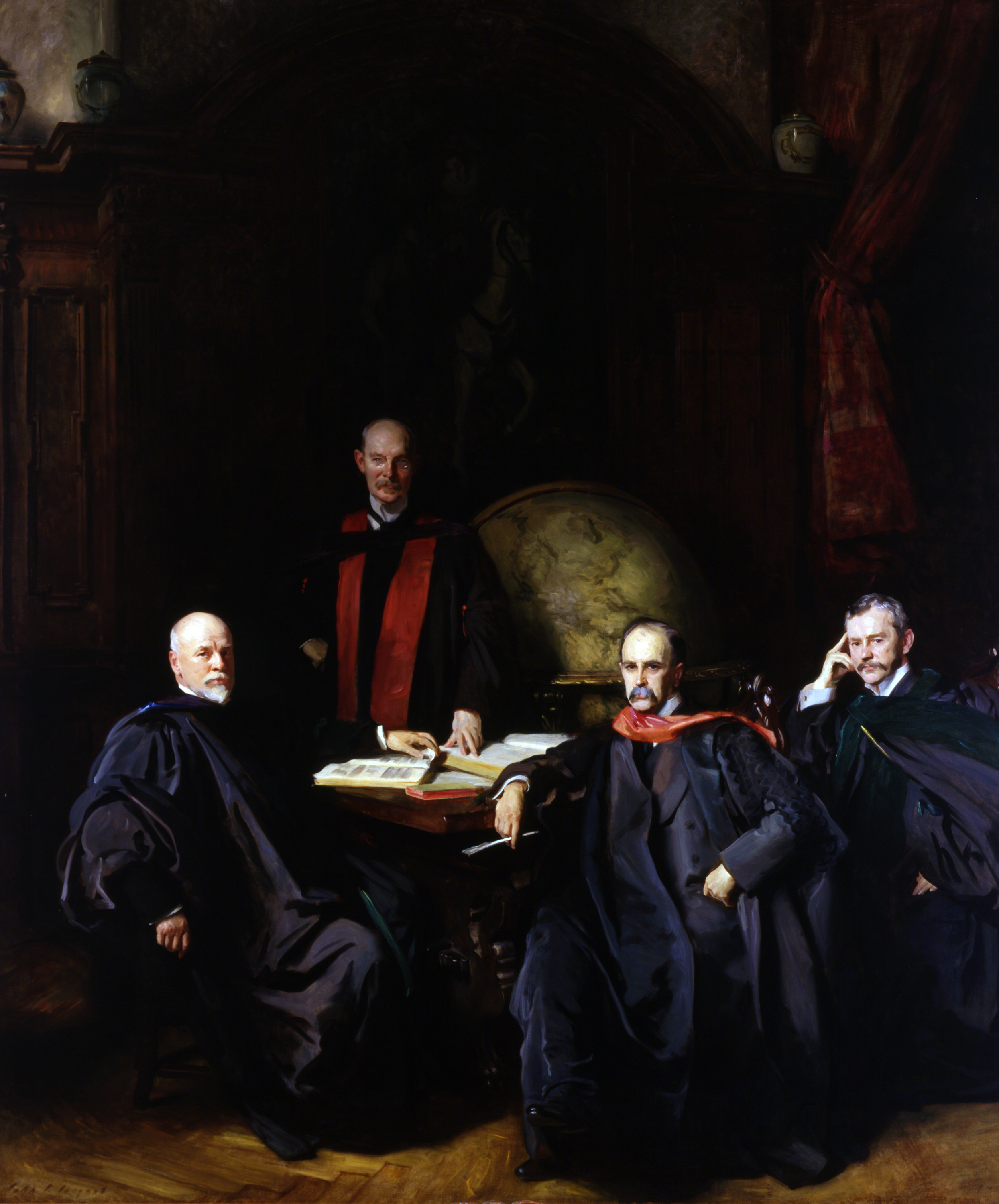
The Four Doctors by John Singer Sargent, 1905, depicts the four physicians who founded Johns Hopkins Hospital. The original hangs in the William H. Welch Medical Library of Johns Hopkins University. From left to right: William Henry Welch, William Stewart Halsted, William Osler, Howard Kelly

He reduced the role of didactic lectures and once said he hoped his tombstone would say only, "He brought medical students into the wards for bedside teaching." He also said, "I desire no other epitaph ... than the statement that I taught medical students in the wards, as I regard this as by far the most useful and important work I have been called upon to do." Osler fundamentally changed medical teaching in North America, and this influence, helped by a few such as the Dutch internist P. K. Pel, spread to medical schools across the globe.

Osler was a collector of books and other material relevant to the history of medicine. He willed his library to the Faculty of Medicine of McGill University where it now forms the nucleus of McGill University's Osler Library of the History of Medicine. Osler was a strong supporter of libraries and served on the library committees at most of the universities at which he taught and was a member of the Board of Curators of the Bodleian Library in Oxford. He was instrumental in founding the Medical Library Association in North America, alongside employee and mentee Marcia Croker Noyes, and served as its second president from 1901 to 1904. In Britain he was the first (and only) president of the Medical Library Association of Great Britain and Ireland and also a president of The Bibliographical Society (1913–1919).

Osler was a prolific author and public speaker and his public speaking and writing were both done in a clear, lucid style. His most famous work, The Principles and Practice of Medicine quickly became a key text to students and clinicians alike. It continued to be published in many editions until 2001 and was translated into many languages. It is notable in part for supporting the use of bloodletting as recently as 1923. Though his own textbook was a major influence in medicine for many years, Osler described Avicenna as the "author of the most famous medical textbook ever written". He noted that Avicenna's Canon of Medicine remained "a medical bible for a longer time than any other work". Osler's essays were important guides to physicians. The title of his most famous essay, "Aequanimitas", espousing the importance of imperturbability, is the motto on the Osler family crest and is used on the Osler housestaff tie and scarf at Hopkins.

== Controversies ==
=== Racism ===
Osler said Canada should be a "white man's country" in a 1914 speech given around the time of the Komagata Maru incident involving immigration from India. Osler wrote "I hate Latin Americans" in a letter to Henry Vining Ogden. Under the pseudonym "Egerton Yorrick Davis", Osler mocked Indigenous people: "Every primitive tribe retains some vile animal habit not yet eliminated in the upward march of the race." Uncovering this historical context, the journalists David Bruser and Markus Grill and the archivist Nils Seethaler reconstruct the shipment of several indigenous skulls by Osler from Canada to Germany, which were (previously unknown) in the custody of the State Museums of Berlin.

=== Gerontology ===
Osler is well known in the field of gerontology for the speech he gave when leaving Hopkins to become the Regius Professor of Medicine at Oxford. "The Fixed Period", given on February 22, 1905, included some controversial words about old age. Osler, who had a well-developed humorous side to his character, was in his mid-fifties when he gave the speech and in it he mentioned Anthony Trollope's The Fixed Period (1882), which envisaged a college where men retired at 67 and after being given a year to settle their affairs, would be "peacefully extinguished by chloroform". He claimed that, "the effective, moving, vitalizing work of the world is done between the ages of twenty-five and forty" and it was downhill from then on. Osler's speech was covered by the popular press which headlined their reports with "Osler recommends chloroform at sixty". The concept of mandatory euthanasia for humans after a "fixed period" (often 60 years) became a recurring theme in 20th century science fiction—for example, Isaac Asimov's 1950 novel Pebble in the Sky, and Half a Life (Star Trek: The Next Generation). In the 3rd edition of his Textbook, he also coined the description of pneumonia as "the friend of the aged" since it allowed elderly individuals a quick, comparatively painless death: "Taken off by it in an acute, short, not often painful illness, the old man escapes those 'cold gradations of decay' so distressing to himself and his friends." Coincidentally, Osler himself died of pneumonia.

== Personal life and family ==
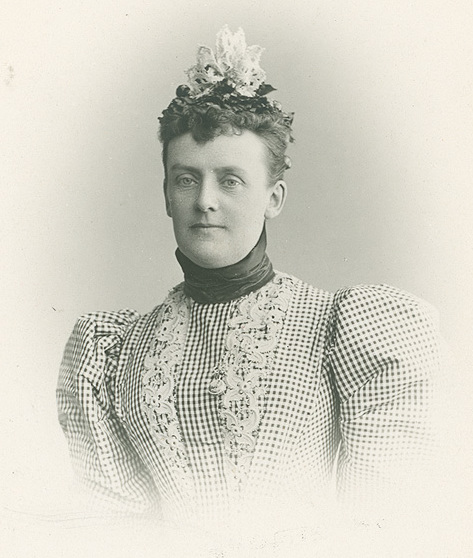
Grace Revere Osler

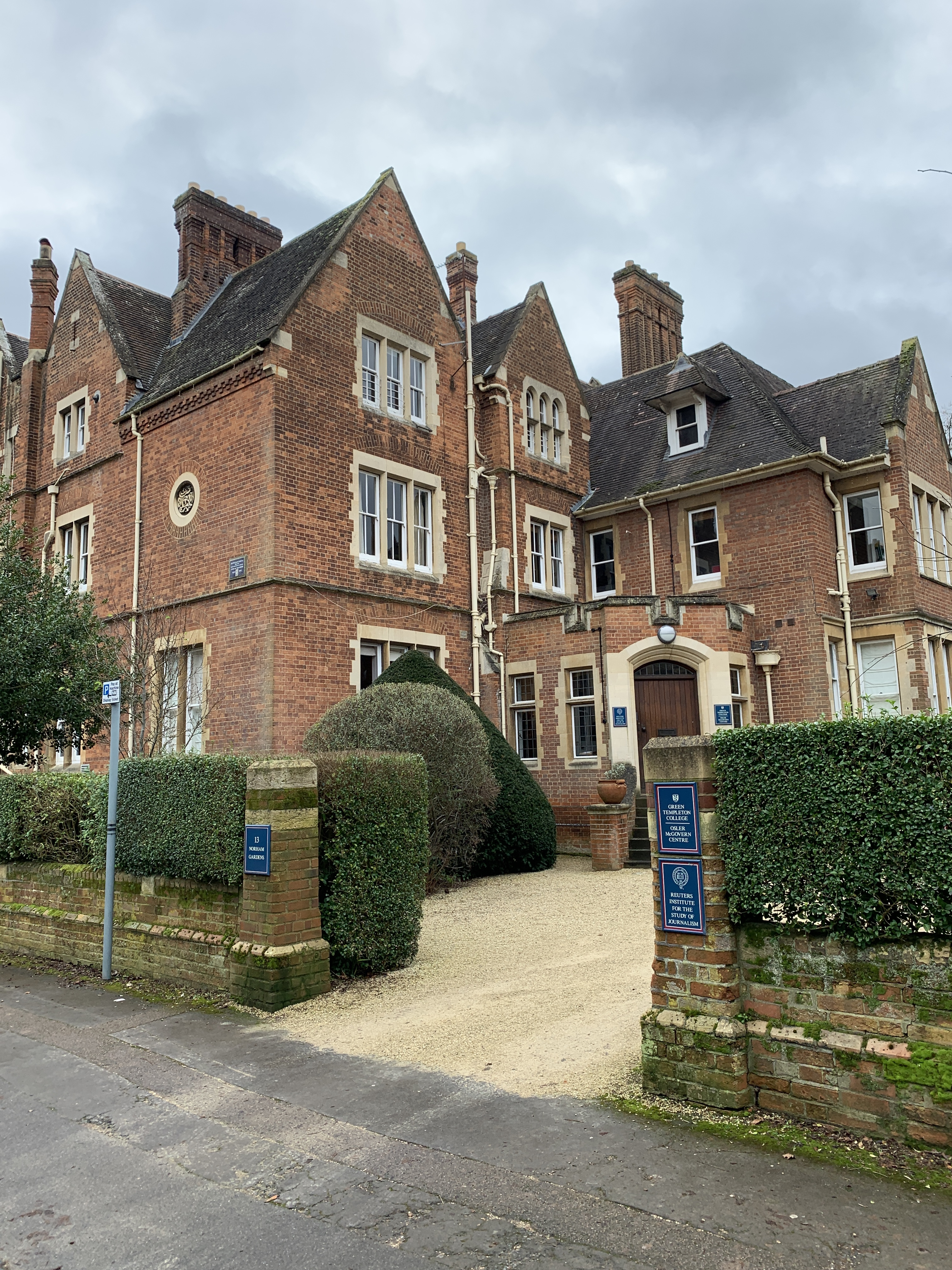
13 Norham Gardens: Sir William Osler's residence in Oxford

An inveterate prankster, he wrote several humorous pieces under the pseudonym "Egerton Yorrick Davis", even fooling the editors of the Philadelphia Medical News into publishing a report on the extremely rare phenomenon of penis captivus, on December 13, 1884. The letter was apparently a response to a report on the phenomenon of vaginismus reported three weeks previously in the Philadelphia Medical News by Osler's colleague Theophilus Parvin. Davis, a prolific writer of letters to medical societies, purported to be a retired U.S. Army surgeon living in Caughnawaga, Quebec (now Kahnawake), author of a fake paper on the obstetrical habits of Native American tribes that was intended as a joke on his rival, Dr. William A. Molson. The piece was never published in Osler's lifetime, nor was it intended to be published; Osler knew the content was outrageous, but he wanted to make a fool of Molson by getting the piece to the brink of publication in the Montreal Medical Journal, of which Molson was the editor. Osler would enhance Davis's myth by signing Davis's name to hotel registers and medical conference attendance lists; Davis was eventually reported drowned in the Lachine Rapids in 1884.

Throughout his life, Osler was a great admirer of the 17th century physician and philosopher Sir Thomas Browne.

He died at the age of 70, on December 29, 1919, in Oxford, during the Spanish flu epidemic, most likely of complications from undiagnosed bronchiectasis. His wife, Grace, lived another nine years but succumbed to a series of strokes. Sir William and Lady Osler's ashes now rest in a niche in the Osler Library at McGill University. They had two sons, one of whom died shortly after birth. The other, Edward Revere Osler, was mortally wounded in combat in World War I at the age of 21, during the 3rd battle of Ypres (also known as the battle of Passchendaele). At the time of his death in August 1917, he was a second lieutenant in the (British) Royal Field Artillery; Lt. Osler's grave is in the Dozinghem Military Cemetery in West Flanders, Belgium. According to one biographer, Osler was emotionally crushed by the loss; he was particularly anguished by the fact that his influence had been used to procure a military commission for his son, who had mediocre eyesight. Lady Osler (Grace Revere) was born in Boston in 1854; her paternal great-grandfather was Paul Revere. In 1876, she married Samuel W. Gross, chairman of surgery at Jefferson Medical College in Philadelphia and son of Dr. Samuel D. Gross. Gross died in 1889 and in 1892 she married William Osler who was then professor of medicine at Johns Hopkins University.

Osler was a founding donor of the American Anthropometric Society, a group of academics who pledged to donate their brains for scientific study. His brain was donated to the American Anthropometric Society after his death and is currently stored at the Wistar Institute in Philadelphia. A study of his brain, conducted in 1927, concluded that there were differences between the brains of the highly intelligent and normal brains. In April 1987 it was taken to the Mütter Museum, on 22nd Street near Chestnut in Philadelphia where it was displayed during the annual meeting of the American Osler Society. He was elected as a member to the American Philosophical Society in 1885.

In 1925, a biography of William Osler was written by Harvey Cushing, who received the 1926 Pulitzer Prize for the work. A later biography by Michael Bliss was published in 1999. In 1994 Osler was inducted into the Canadian Medical Hall of Fame.

== Arms ==
Coat of arms of Osler of Toronto
Crest A beaver Proper, resting the dexter foot on a fleur-de-lys Or. Escutcheon Barry wavy Argent and Azure, three pilchards hauriant Proper, all within a bordure Sable charged with eight bezants. Motto Dii laboribus omnia vendunt. (not shown)

== Legacy ==
Several diseases and symptoms were named for him, in addition to many schools and medical centers.

=== Conditions ===
- Osler's sign is an artificially high systolic blood pressure reading due to the calcification of atherosclerotic arteries
- Osler's nodes are raised tender nodules on the pulps of fingertips or toes, suggestive of subacute bacterial endocarditis. Osler described them as "ephemeral spots of a painful nodular erythema, chiefly in the skin of the hands and feet." Osler nodes are usually painful, as opposed to Janeway lesions which are due to emboli and are painless.
- Osler–Weber–Rendu disease (also known as hereditary hemorrhagic telangiectasia) is a syndrome of multiple vascular malformations on the skin, in the nasal and oral mucosa, in the lungs and elsewhere.
- Osler–Vaquez disease (also known as Polycythemia vera)
- Osler–Libman–Sacks syndrome is an atypical, verrucous, nonbacterial, valvular and mural endocarditis. Final stage of systemic lupus erythematosus.
- Osler's manoeuvre: in pseudohypertension, the blood pressure as measured by the sphygmomanometer is artificially high because of arterial wall calcification. Osler's manoeuvre takes a patient who has a palpable, although pulseless, radial artery while the blood pressure cuff is inflated above systolic pressure; thus they are considered to have "Osler's sign".
- Osler's rule: States that a neurological defect has to be related to a specific lesion, in contrast to Hickam's dictum, which states that the neurological defect can be due to several lesions.
- Osler's syndrome is a syndrome of recurrent episodes of colic pain, with typical radiation to back, cold shiverings and fever; due to the presence in Vater's diverticulum of a free-moving gallstone which is larger than the orifice.
- Osler's triad (also known as Austrian Syndrome): association of pneumonia, endocarditis, and meningitis.

=== Zoological taxonomy ===
- Sphryanura osleri is a trematode worm found in the gills of a newt.
- Oslerus osleri is a metastrongyloid nematode lungworm parasite of wild and domestic canids. Osler discovered the parasite while teaching comparative pathology at McGill.

=== Buildings ===
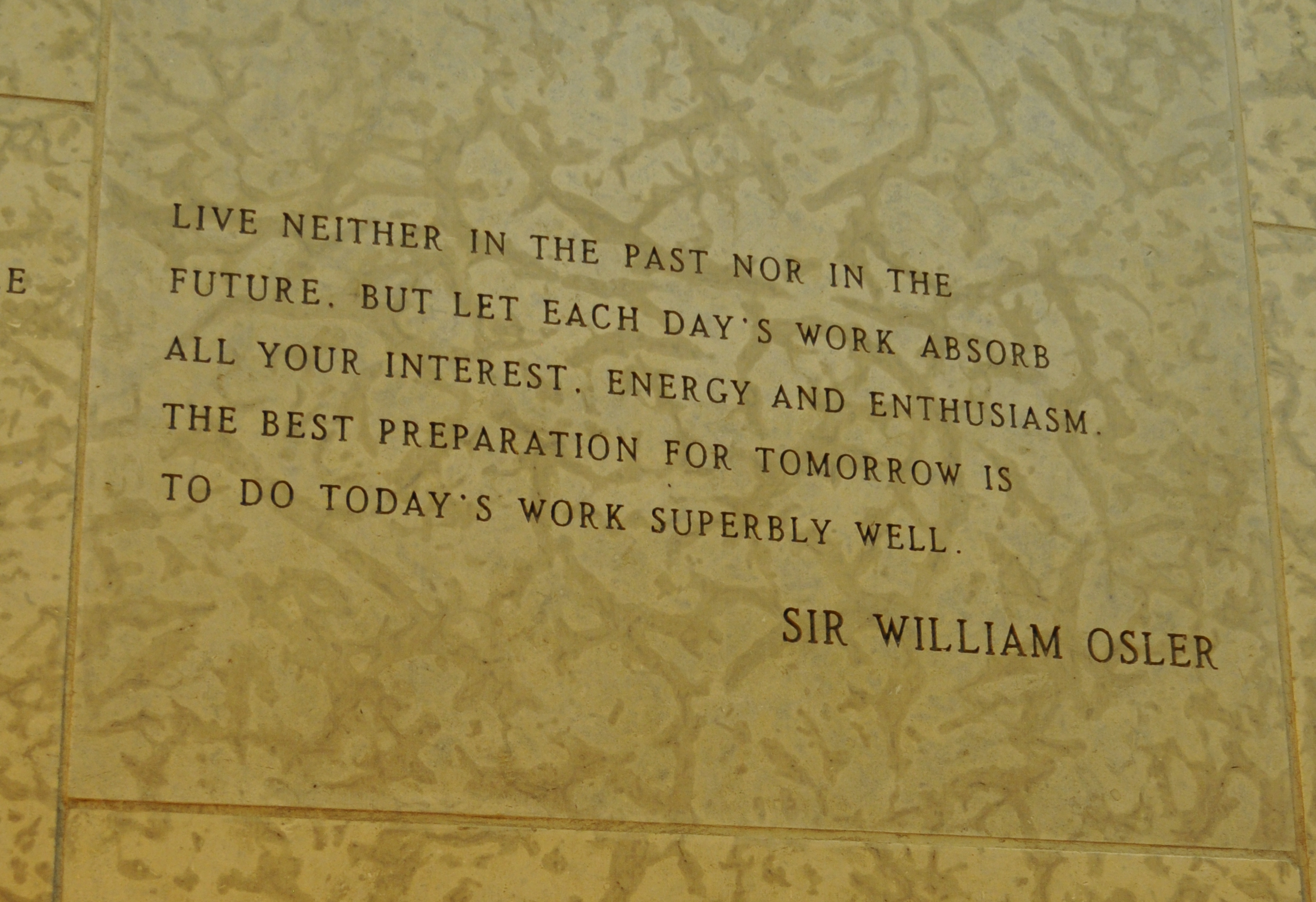
A quote by Sir William Osler engraved in the stone wall within the Peace Chapel of the International Peace Garden (in Manitoba Canada and North Dakota, US)

- Osler Building at The Johns Hopkins Hospital currently The Johns Hopkins Hospital Human Resources. Until 2012 the Medical Intensive Care Unit (MICU) was located on the 7th floor
- Sir William Osler Elementary School – Elementary School in Vancouver, British Columbia
- Ecole Sir William Osler School – Elementary School Winnipeg, Manitoba
- Sir William Osler Elementary School – HWDSB Elementary School in Dundas, Ontario
- Sir William Osler High School, Agincourt area of Scarborough in what is now Toronto, Ontario
- Sir William Osler Public School Simcoe County District School Board Elementary School in Bradford West Gwillimbury, Ontario and 3 kilometres away from his birthplace, Bond Head, Ontario
- Osler Library of the History of Medicine, McGill University, Montreal. Osler left his 8000 volume collection of books on the history of medicine to his alma mater. The library now holds over 100,000 volumes and is Canada's de facto 'national library of the history of medicine'
- Promenade Sir-William-Osler (Formerly the upper section of rue Drummond.) adjacent to the campus of McGill University in Montreal, Quebec and leading to the McIntyre Medical Sciences Building, which houses the Osler Library of the History of Medicine
- William Osler Health System 1998 near Brampton, Ontario
- Osler House is the student mess for clinical medical students of Oxford University and is found at the John Radcliffe Hospital in Oxford
- Osler Ward is the Respiratory Medicine ward of the John Radcliffe Hospital in Oxford.
- Osler House is also the name of the old Observer's House, next to the Radcliffe Observatory in Green Templeton College, Oxford, a Grade I listed building
- Osler House is one of the two undergraduate hostels of the JIPMER medical school in Puducherry, India
- Osler Textbook Room 1999 at Johns Hopkins Hospital in the room in the Billings Building where Osler wrote "Principles and Practice of Medicine". It houses a collection of Osler memorabilia
- Osler Center for Clinical Excellence 2002 devoted to teaching "the basic elements of a sound doctor patient relationship"
- Osler Hall is Main Hall of "Med Chi" or Medical and Chirurgical Faculty, the Maryland State Medical Society, located on Cathedral Street in Baltimore. The Med Chi House of Delegates meets and deliberates in Osler Hall wherein hang numerous portraits of famous Maryland physicians including a large portrait of Osler
- Osler House (a medical residence) in Townsville, Queensland, Australia is believed to be named after him
- Osler House, Osler's childhood home in Dundas, Ontario.
- Osler Parking Structure and Osler Lane, at University of California, San Diego were changed following a petition submitted by a Native American medical student from the Pauma Band of Luiseno Mission Indians in 2021.

=== Awards ===
- American Association for the History of medicine, William Osler Medal.
- Osler Library, McGill University. Pam and Rolando Del Maestro William Osler Medical Students Essay Awards.
- Osler Lecture at the Worshipful Society of Apothecaries.
- Student Award in Oslerian Medicine

== In popular culture ==
Stewart Arnott portrays Osler in episode 5 of season 11 "Dr. Osler Regrets" (October 23, 2017) of the Canadian television period detective series Murdoch Mysteries.

In Season 1, Episode 7 of Star Trek: Lower Decks, the Starfleet medical ship is the NX-75300 "Osler".

Baronetage of the United Kingdom
New creation	Baronet (of Norham Gardens); 1911–1919	Extinct
Preceded by Markham baronets	Osler baronets of Norham Gardens; 11 July 1911	Succeeded by Younger baronets
