= James Bovell =

James Bovell (1817–1880) was a prominent Canadian physician, microscopist, educator, theologian and minister.

In his youth, he traveled to London to study medicine at Guy's Hospital. There, he was related to Sir Astley Cooper and had Richard Bright and Thomas Addison among his professors, and Robert Graves and William Stokes among his colleagues. He studied at schools in Edinburgh and Glasgow and later was elected a member of the Royal College of Physicians.

When he returned to Canada he worked on the fields of pathology and clinical microscopy, and he founded the Upper Canada Journal of Medical, Surgical, and Physical Science which he edited. He became an important member of the Canadian Institute and later became a vice president of it. He became an early mentor of the famous physician William Osler, whom he strongly influenced in his early years.

Bovell later became a clergyman of the Church of England and wrote on the topic of natural theology. He is known for his rejection of the Darwinian theory of evolution and Lyell's geology, believing instead in the Book of Genesis on the side of the early Louis Agassiz and John Hunter. Yet, he wrote on the relation of religion and science. In a book published in 1860 he wrote to the Diocese of Huron "with the hope that the explanations given may remove erroneous impressions" at the Church in Canada.

== Works ==
- A lecture on the future of Canada (1846)
- An outline of the history of the British church from the earliest times to the period of Reformation (1852)
- Outlines of natural theology for the use of the Canadian student (1859)
- Defence of doctrinal statement (1860)
- Passing thoughts on man's relation to God and on God's relation to man (1862)
- A plea for inebriate asylums: commended of the consideration of the legislators of the province of Canada (1862)
- Letters: addressed to the Rev. Mr. Fletcher and others: framers of a series of resolutions on "ritual" (1867)
- The world at the advent of the Lord Jesus. Toronto : W.C. Chewett. (1868)
