= George Downing Liveing =

English chemist and spectroscopist

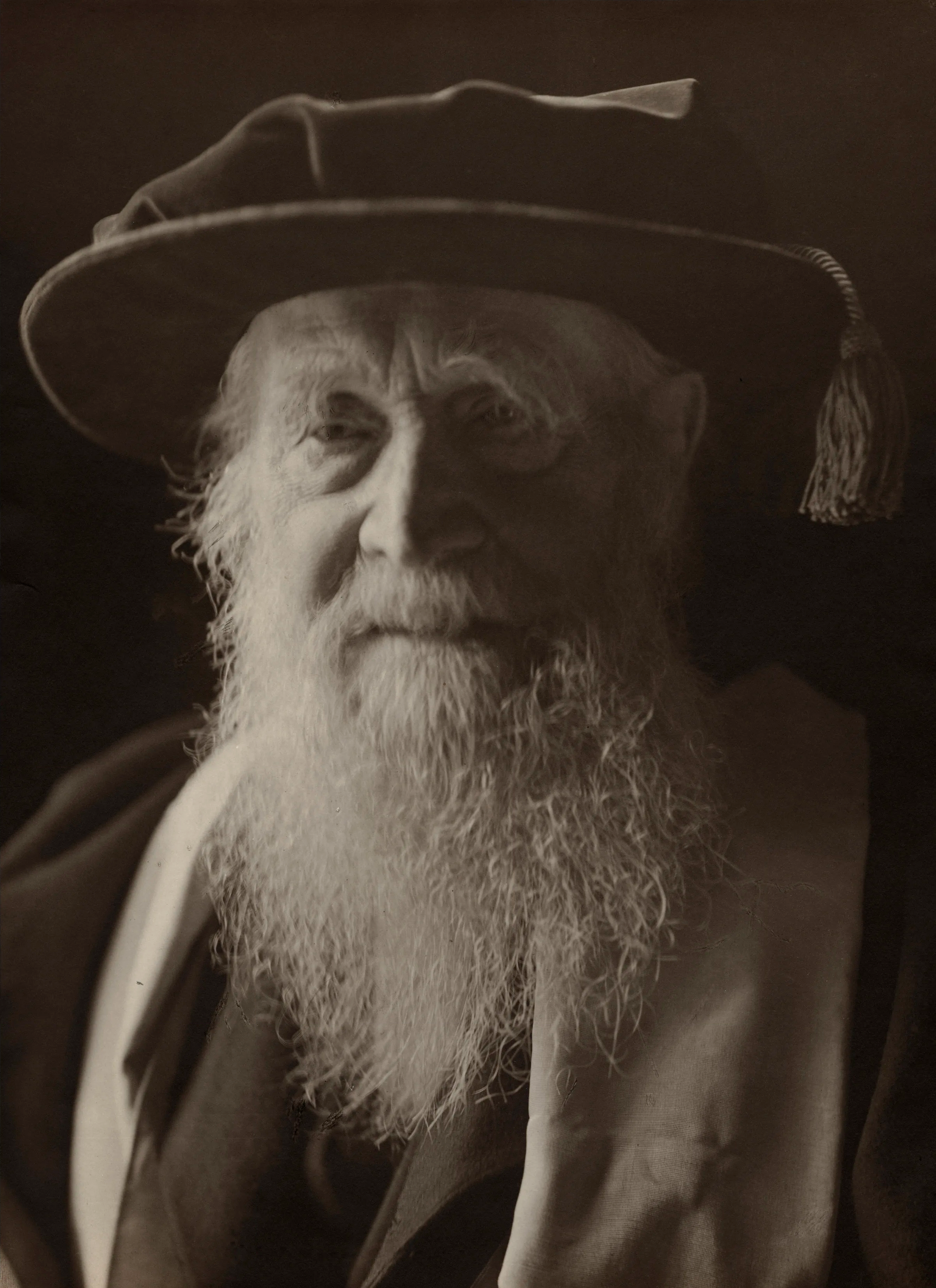
- Portrait by Olive Edis, 1923
- Born: 21 December 1827; Nayland, Suffolk, England
- Died: 26 December 1924 (aged 97); Cambridge, Cambridgeshire, England
- Occupations: Chemist, spectroscopist
- Spouse: Catherine Ingram
- Awards: Davy Medal (1901)

George Downing Liveing FRS (21 December 1827 – 26 December 1924) was an English chemist, spectroscopist and university administrator.

== Early life ==
He was born in Nayland, Suffolk, the eldest son of Dr. Edward Liveing (1795–1843) and Catherine Mary Downing (1798–1872).

== Academic career ==
Liveing was educated at St John's College, Cambridge, completing a BA in the Mathematical Tripos in 1850 and then postgraduate study for the Natural Sciences Tripos, in which he obtained distinction in chemistry and mineralogy; he received a MA in 1853. Later in his life he was awarded an Honorary ScD in 1908. In 1853 St John's College founded for him a College Lectureship in Chemistry and built for his use a Chemical Laboratory behind New Court. He was a Fellow of the college until he married in 1860 but he retained his lectureship there until 1865 and in 1911 was elected as its President, a position that he held until his death in 1924. Following the death of James Cumming in 1861, Liveing was elected to the 1702 Chair of Chemistry at Cambridge University, at an initial salary of £100 per annum and from 1860 to 1880 he held additional posts at the Staff College, Camberley and the Royal Military College, Sandhurst as Professor of Chemistry. He retired in 1908 at the age of 81. He was elected a Fellow of the Royal Society in 1879 and was awarded the Society's Davy Medal in 1901 "for his contributions to spectroscopy". Liveing collaborated with James Dewar, who was Jacksonian Professor of Natural Philosophy at Cambridge from 1875 to 1923. Together they published 78 papers on spectroscopic topics.

== Personal life ==
In 1860 Liveing and Catherine Ingram married. He died on Boxing Day 1924, aged 97, as the result of being knocked down by a cyclist while walking to his laboratory. He was buried in the Parish of the Ascension Burial Ground in Cambridge, next to his wife who had died in 1888.
