= Osler Library of the History of Medicine =

Branch of the McGill University Library

Coordinates: 45.50315°N 73.58248°W

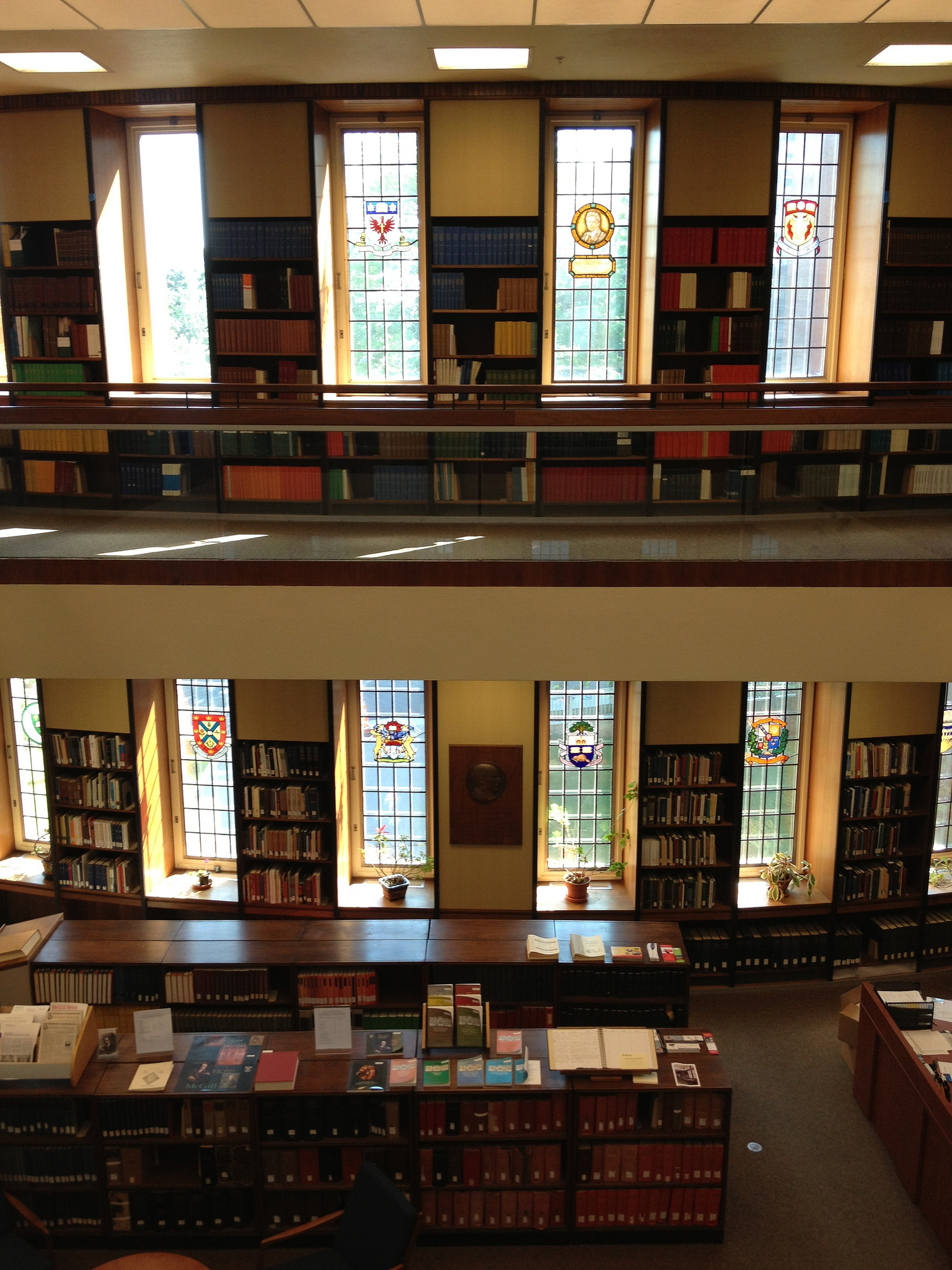
- Interior view from the second floor of the Wellcome Camera
- Type: a branch of the McGill University Library, Academic information repository and research resource
- Established: 1929

Collection
- Items collected: current publications on medical history, historic texts, reference collection, archives, manuscripts
- Criteria for collection: history of medicine,

Other information
- Director: Mary Yearl
- Employees: 3
- Website: Osler Library of the History of Medicine

The Osler Library, a branch of the McGill University Library, is Canada's foremost scholarly resource for the history of medicine, and one of the most important libraries of its type in North America. It is located in the McIntyre Medical Sciences Building in Montreal.

== Collection ==
The nucleus of the Library is the collection of 8,000 rare and historic works on the history of medicine and allied subjects presented to the Faculty of Medicine of McGill University by Sir William Osler (1849–1919). Sir William's original collection is described in the printed catalogue, Bibliotheca Osleriana, and information on the whole of the printed collection and much of the manuscript collections is listed in the McGill University online catalogue. Since the opening of the Library in 1929, the collection has continued to grow by purchase, gift, and transfer (particularly, in the latter case, of older health-related books from McGill's former Medical Library and Life Sciences Library.)

In addition to the Osler Library's holdings of rare and old books, there is a strong circulating collection of current secondary works and modern editions of historic texts, as well as a reference collection, archives and manuscripts, portraits and artifacts. In particular, the Osler Library has a large collection of incunabula (over 150 volumes), an outstanding collection of editions of the works of Sir Thomas Browne (author of Religio Medici, the 17th-century classic), and a collection of some 30,000 19th-century French medical theses, primarily from Paris.

The total number of works currently housed in the library is approximately 100,000, and includes books old and new, as well as periodicals about the history of medical science and allied fields. The library also includes an important archival collection, both in scope (more than 200 archival fonds) and in content, documenting the history and the development of medicine and its teaching from the 19th century.

== History ==
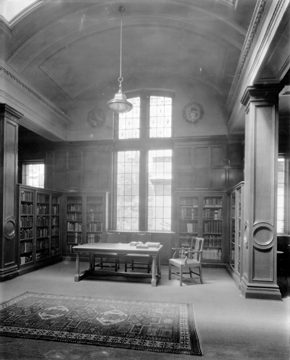
Osler Library interior, 1925.

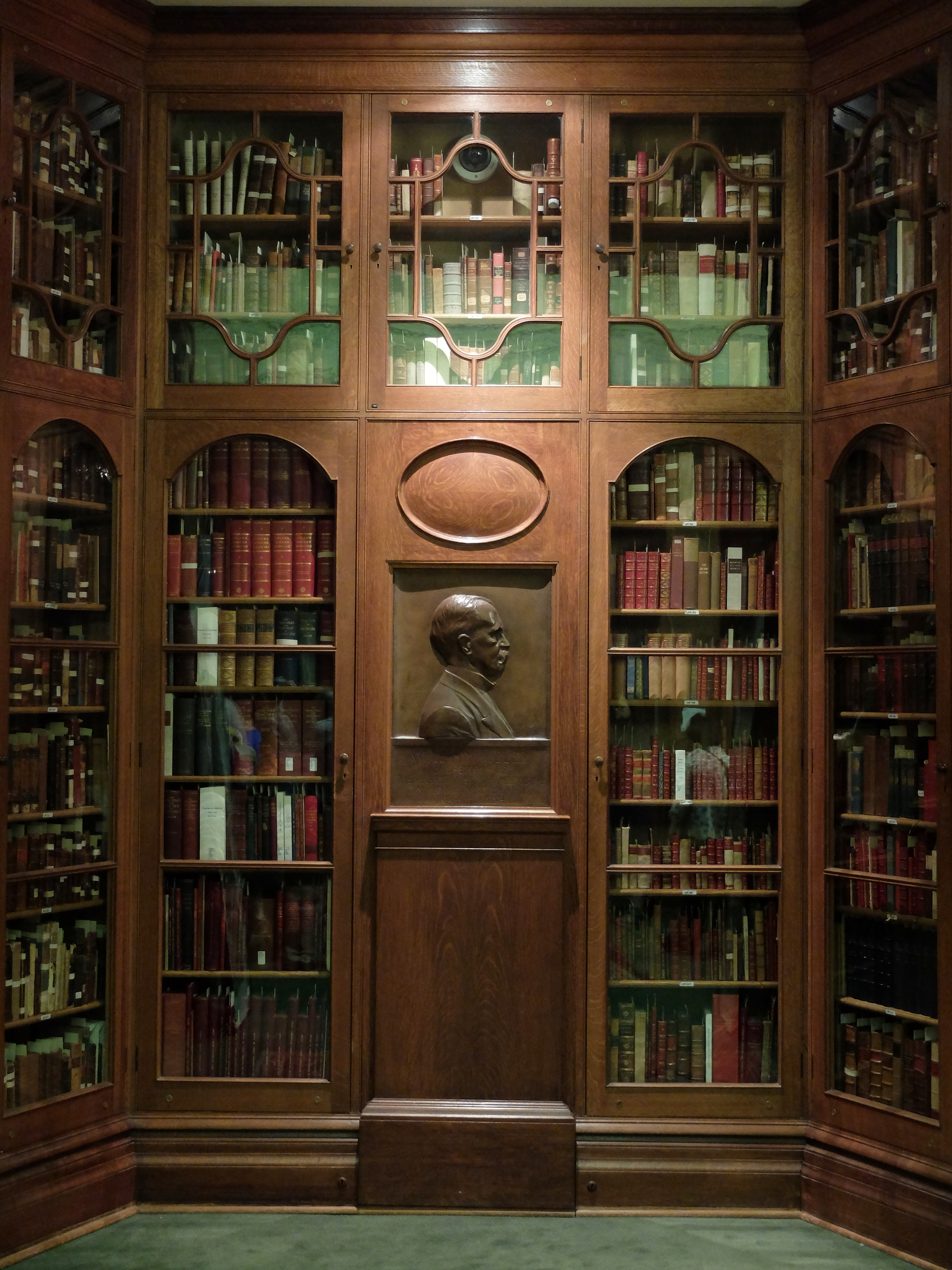
Osler’s relief in the library.

Percy Erskine Nobbs designed the Osler library for the Strathcona Medical Building (now the Strathcona Anatomy and Dentistry Building), and the library officially opened there in May 1929. In 1965, both the contents of the library and the interior oak paneling and shelving were moved to their present location within the newly built McIntyre Medical Sciences Building. At that time the "Wellcome Camera" was added to the library with the financial assistance of the Wellcome Trust. Initially most of the windows on the first floor of the Camera were provided with stained-glass coats-of-arms; one for each of the twelve Canadian universities which then had medical faculties. In 1985 four additional coats-of-arms were added; only the coat-of-arms of the Northern Ontario School of Medicine is currently missing. The Osler Library was further expanded and renovated in 2001-02 and in 2014. In summer 2018 the roof terrace above the library caught fire. Though the library and archives were not harmed by fire, the area suffered water damage and the collection was moved to McGill's McLennan-Redpath Library complex while the building underwent repairs. There was some discussion about the library remaining in the McLennan-Redpath building but, in late 2021, McGill's Principal announced that the Library would return to the McIntyre Medical Sciences Building - the collections were moved back there in summer 2022 and it re-opened to users in September 2022.

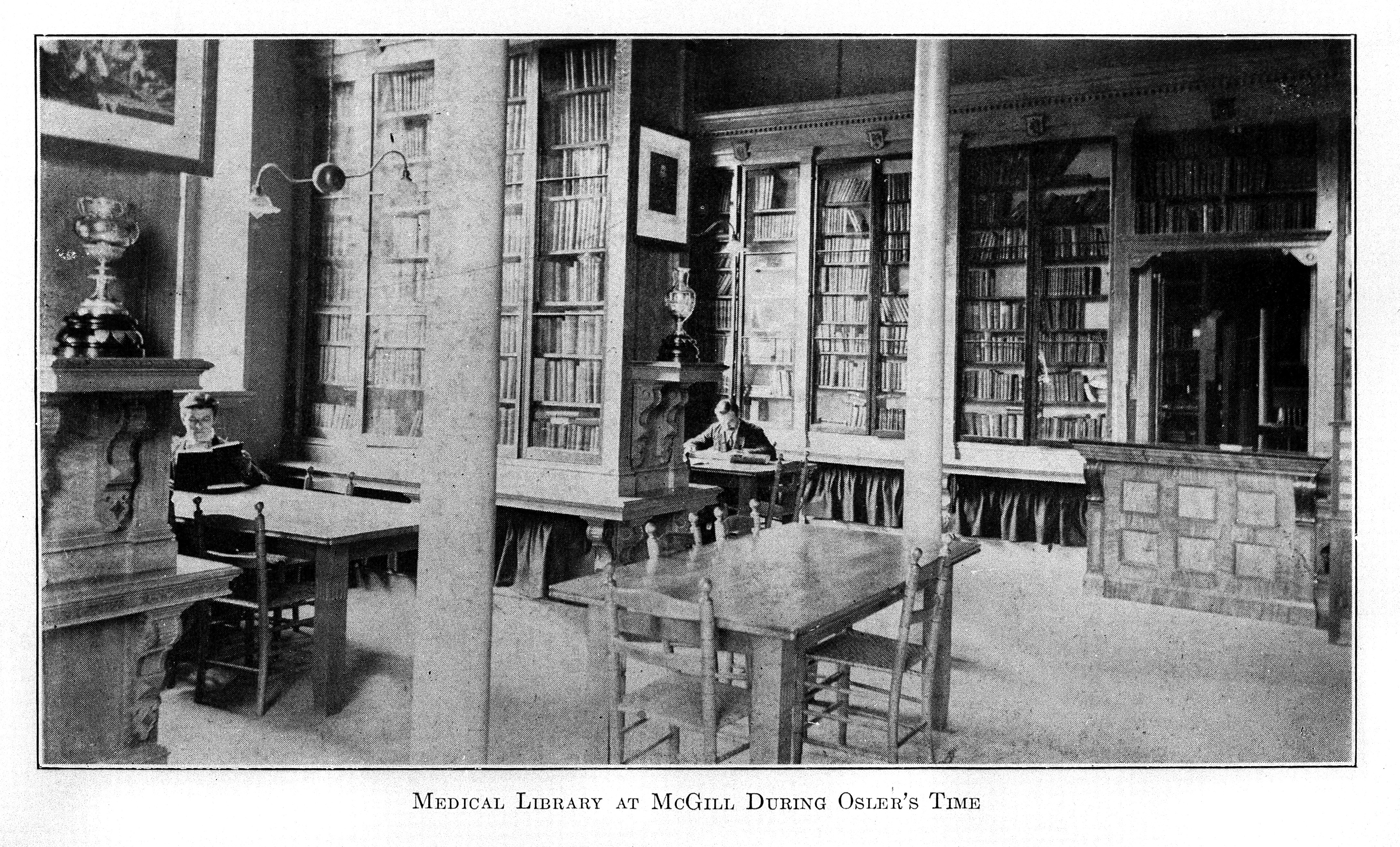
The Medical Library during Osler's time

In the design of the Osler Library everything has been subordinated to the books themselves; those in the Osler Room are arranged in full view behind glass cabinetry. The fittings and furnishings of the Osler Library were designed by architects Percy Nobbs & George Taylor Hyde. The stained glass window in the Osler Room depicts the staff and serpent, symbols of healing associated with the Greek god Asclepius, and a held-out book representing the university.

After their deaths, the ashes of both Sir William and Lady Osler were placed in a niche within the library so that they continue to be surrounded by Sir William's favourite books.

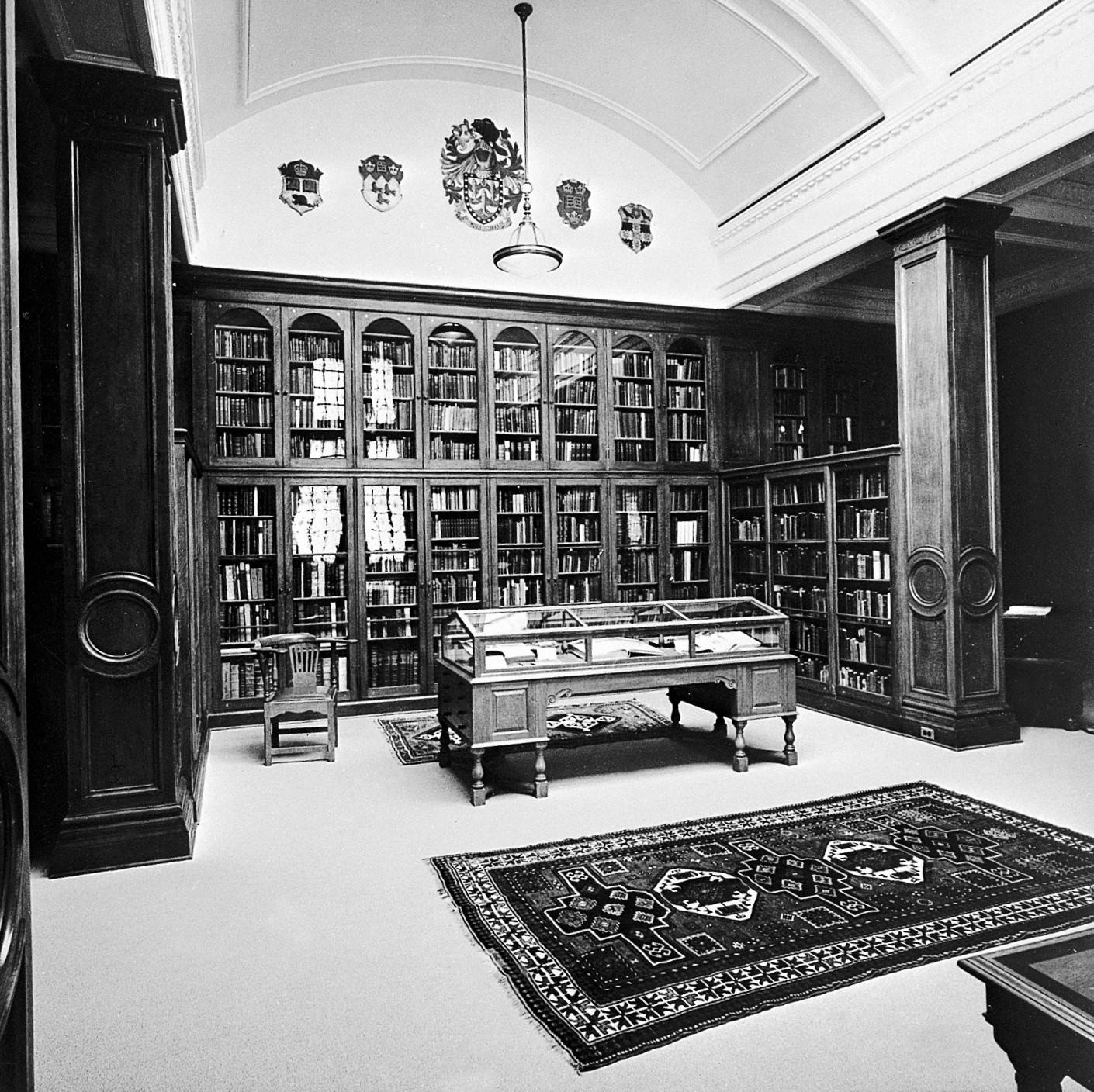
Osler Library, East bay, with Osler's coat-of-arms in the centre top, other crests from left to right, Universities of Toronto, McGill, Oxford, and Christ Church. On the opposite wall are other institutions with which Osler had affiliation, University of Pennsylvania and the Johns Hopkins University.

== Partnerships and collaboration ==
The McGill University Library is a member of the Association of Research Libraries, Canadian Association of Research Libraries, and is a contributor to the Open Content Alliance. In January 2016, Osler Library of the History of Medicine started contributing material to the Medical Heritage Library.

== See also ==
- McGill University Faculty of Medicine and Health Sciences
- The Principles and Practice of Medicine
- McGill University Library
- McGill Department of Social Studies of Medicine
