= Josefina Bautista Magno =

- Born: December 28, 1919; San Fernando, Pampanga, Luzon, the Philippines
- Died: July 27, 2003 (aged 83); Manila, Luzon, the Philippines
- Education: University of Santo Tomas (magna cum laude medical graduate), Georgetown University (oncology), St. Christopher's Hospice (study abroad)
- Occupations: Assistant to the Philippines Secretary of Health, University Hospital Medical Coordinator, Hospice Care Professional
- Spouse: Cesar P. Magno

Josefina Bautista Magno was a figure in the Hospice and Palliative Care network. Born and raised in the Philippines, Josefina Magno brought one the earliest programs for hospice care to the United States when she immigrated in the 1960s. The introduction of hospice care into American Healthcare has led to a series of widespread changes that benefit millions of Americans. The American Academy of Hospice and Palliative Medicine was co-founded by Magno, just one of the many contributions she brought to the United States. As a practitioner, she continued to run studies, research papers, and spoke at conferences about the improvements and benefits of hospice care.

== Education ==
Josefina Magno graduated magna cum laude from the University of Santo Tomas with a medical degree. Following her schooling in the Philippines and her treatment of cancer, Josefina Magno went on to train as an oncologist at Georgetown University when it opened its Division of Medical Oncology. Her first introduction to the hospice industry came from her study in the United Kingdom, where Cicely Saunders had begun the world's first hospice center.

== Career ==
A few years after her husband's death, Josefina began her medical career in the Philippine Government as a special assistant to the chairman of the National Science Development Board and then the assistant to the Secretary of Health. Around 1969 when she moved to Washington DC, she became the Community Medical Coordinator of the Rehabilitation Project of the George Washington University Hospital. While studying oncology at Georgetown University a few years later, she was a clinical associate for the university hospital.

Josefina's first efforts to bring hospice care to the US started in 1976. In this early effort, she managed to convince her Georgetown University President to allow her to set up a pilot training project. This school project eventually became the Hospice of Northern Virginia. Magno was also the executive director of the National Hospice Organization in 1980 and the president of the International Hospice Institute in 1984. She became the education, research, and development director of the Henry Ford Hospice in Detroit, Michigan.

She moved back to the Philippines in 1995 and worked with the Philippine Department of Health and Philippine Cancer Society to develop hospice care models there.

Magno was quoted in a 1996 interview saying, "We developed the hospice concept to eliminate the physical suffering of terminally ill patients (most often through palliative drugs) so people wouldn't feel so isolated."

Josefina continued to work and study the forgotten aspects of healthcare. Much of her work acted as a way to teach other medical professionals about their care blind spots. Her work was motivated largely by creating accessible care for all types of patients. Her personal reports can be found at Sage Journals, Death Studies Journal, and Research Gate.

== Personal life ==
Born December 28, 1919, Josefina Bautista was a native to the Philippine Islands. She later married her University of Santo Tomas classmate, Cesar P. Magno. Together they had seven children: Jose Magno, Manny Magno, Cesar Magno, Vincent Magno, Nanette Magno-Velayo, Mario Magno, and Carlo Magno. Her husband passed away 11 years into their marriage in 1955. In her personal life, Magno had many experiences with the deaths of close ones. Throughout her lifetime, she aided her husband, her son Mario, and her sister throughout their struggles with cancer. Many colleges and close friends feel that these experiences gave her the desire to aid those in their final chapters of life. Magno herself eventually was diagnosed with breast cancer herself, providing her with first hand experience on how it felt to have cancer. Josefina Magno later died in 2003 due to congestive heart failure.

== Integration of hospice care into the United States ==
=== Pilot programs ===
Hospice is an approach to patient care that merges specialized care and oversight of the ill and dying in a caring way. This can include medical care as well as social care alleviating the concerns of living alone at a certain age. Modern hospice care began due to the efforts of Cicely Saunders who opened St Christopher's Hospice in the United Kingdom in 1967. This form of care was first introduced to the United States in 1974, with the first program originating in Connecticut. This first program was sponsored by Florence Wald, an American nurse influenced by Saunders who helped foster the growth of the first hospice institution in Connecticut. Wald's early program was a 44-bed facility that was run by four professionals. This initial hospice program slowly spread to neighboring universities as this new care service was developed.

While studying at Georgetown University, Josefina Magno trained in the United Kingdom where she was also introduced to the hospice care set up by Saunders. As a clinical associate for Georgetown University Hospital in the Division of Medical Oncology, she pioneered the first hospice program in the Washington DC area. This early program had three main goals to train staff in a small six-bed inpatient unit, allow the Blue Cross to monitor the pilot program, and provide consultation and medical care to patents. This pilot program started July 31, 1978 and has since grown to the largest source of inpatient hospital referrals. However, in its earliest days this program faced issues with patient occupancy, high costs, and lack of trained staff. To combat the issue of lack of patients they began a system of referrals where local hospitals could recommend hospice care to patients that fit the needs of the Georgetown program. Through this program they were able to go from 25.8% occupancy in 1878 to full in 1980.

World Health Organization Logo

=== Government involvement ===
After the introduction of initial programs, the federal government quickly took notice of the data (including Magno's pilot project with its involvement of insurance providers) and wanted to incorporate it into federal oversight. Beginning in 1980, the U.S Department of Health, Education, and Welfare wanted to fund 26 hospices as a national program. Following this initiative, the federal government moved to expand Medicare coverage to cover hospice costs in August 1982. In 1982, Congress successfully passed the Medicare Hospice Benefit to reimburse those in need of home-based palliative care. Under this act it protected certain classes of patients with unique needs, ensuring that 80% of their care had to be provided in the patients home. In 1982 the World Health Organization also moved to use the term "palliative care" over "hospice care" to describe a wider range of services.

=== Organizations ===
In the 1970s, the National Hospice Organization had slow beginnings, but on October 5th and 6th, 1978, it had its first national meeting that was planned by Magno as the project manager. In 1979, the organization published a list of qualities and standards that care centers should maintain, and in the spring of 1980, Magno became the first executive director for a couple of years. In 1984, she organized the International Hospice Institute which had its name changed to International Hospice Institute and College in 1996 and is now called the International Association of Hospice and Palliative Care (IAHPC).This gave needed terminal-care training and education opportunities for Americans and for developing countries. Through this program, Magno was able to help establish hospice services in more than 100 countries.
