= Barbara McNulty =

British nurse

- Born: 1917; Blackheath
- Died: 2008 (aged 90–91)
- Employer: St Christopher's Hospice
- Known for: Her work in developing the UK hospice service and the world’s first community palliative care service.
- Awards: FRCN

Barbara McNulty (1917 - 2008) FRCN was a nurse known for her work with Dame Cecily Saunders in developing the UK hospice service and the world’s first community palliative care service.

== Early life ==
Barbara McNulty (née Young) was born in 1917 in Blackheath, London. Her mother died when she was a child leading to a distancing of her relationship with her father after his remarriage. At the age of 17 McNulty competed in the 1934 British Empire Games as a swimmer. She trained at St Thomas's Hospital, London between 1937-1940 helping to receive casualties from the evacuation of Dunkirk. She appears on the Nursing Register in 1941. In 1942 after qualifying, she joined the Colonial Nursing Service and gained a passage to the Middle East. She married an American journalist but the marriage ended in 1956. McNulty said that her commitment to palliative care began when her first child died at the age of three.

== Career ==
McNulty worked overseas until 1960 thereafter returning to England and working as a district nurse in Gloucester where she joined the Taena Community, a Catholic rural commune.

McNulty's work in district nursing bought her into contact with the hospice movement and a period of correspondence with Dame Cecily Saunders. Dame Cecily invited McNulty to join St Christopher's Hospice planning committee and then in 1967 to become one of the hospice's first ward sisters. McNulty had been chosen by Saunders for this role because of her community nursing work.

McNulty was a "key figure" in the establishment of the home palliative care because of her work with Mary Baines on the Home Care Services from St Christophers, the world's first community palliative care service. McNulty and Baines visited patients and liaised with medical services to develop a model of care. She developed extensive experience in hospice work.

Throughout the 1970s and after retirement McNulty spread the hospice idea in the UK and beyond through lectures and contribution to journals. She was also a regular reviewer of books and articles.

McNulty retired from nursing in 1977 and subsequently undertook a counselling course with The Westminster Pastoral Foundation. However she continued to contribute to issues around end of life care, bereavement and longevity by writing, speaking and counselling.

== Awards ==
In 1977 McNulty was awarded Fellowship of the Royal College of Nursing, (FRCN).

== Publications ==
- McNulty, Barbara (1983). "Emotional aspects". In Collins, Sheila; Parker, Edith (eds.). An introduction to nursing. London: Bloomsbury Academic.

== Death ==
Barbara McNulty died in 2008.
