= Abhishek Shukla =

Indian geriatrician and physician

Dr Abhishek Shukla
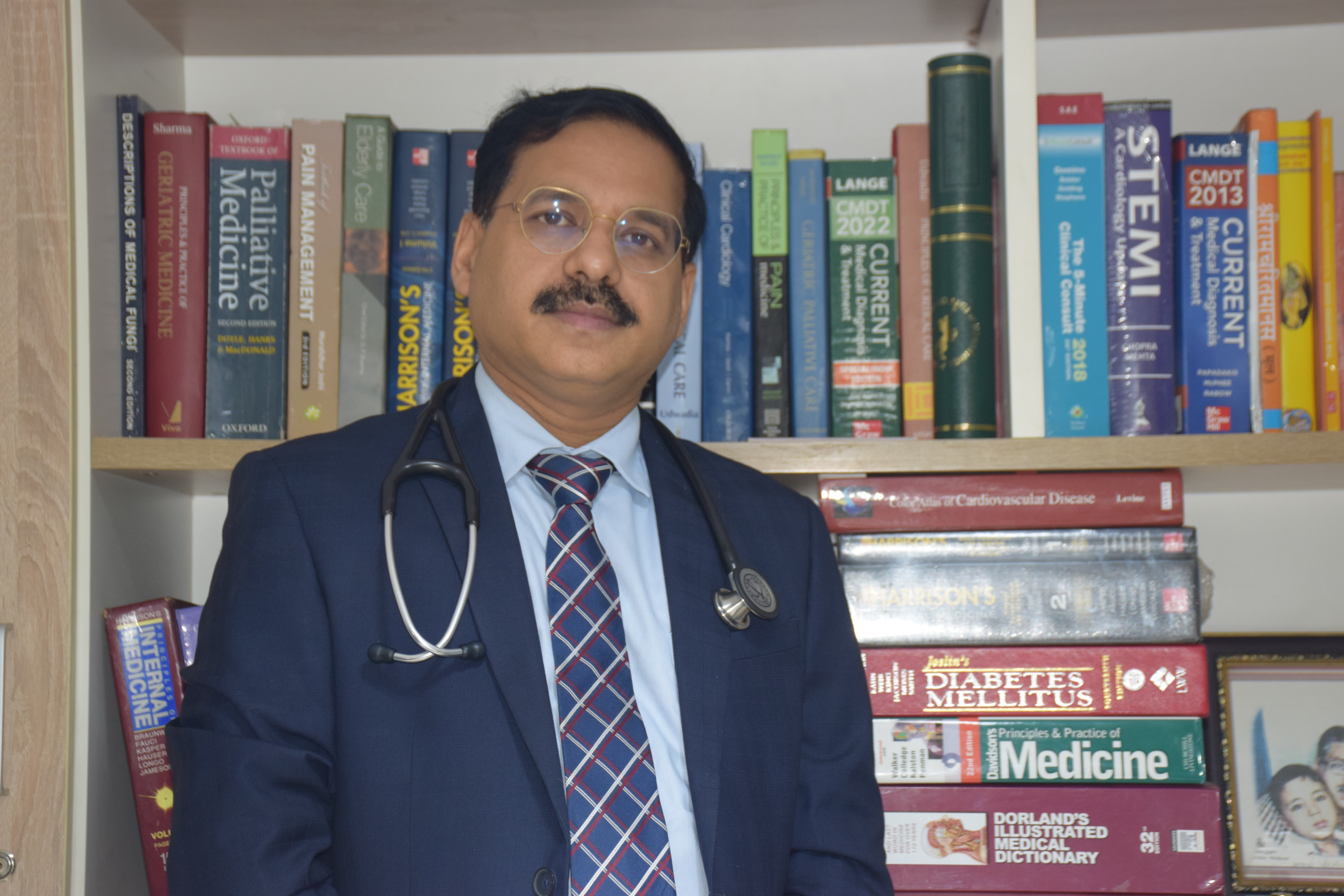
- Born: 23 January 1975 (age 51); Lucknow, Uttar Pradesh, India
- Education: Cardiff University Wales; Royal College of Physicians of Edinburgh; Middlesex University, London; King George's Medical University, Lucknow; University of Maryland School of Graduate Studies, Baltimore, USA
- Years active: 2003–present
- Known for: Pioneer in geriatric, palliative medicine, palliative care & hospice movement in India
- Medical career
- Profession: Physician, Geriatrician, Researcher & Social worker
- Field: Clinical Geriatrics, Palliative Medicine & Palliative Care

Abhishek Shukla is an Indian geriatrician and palliative care physician. He is the expert on Hospice and palliative medicine.

Shukla is the Founder and Secretary of Aastha Centre for Geriatric Medicine, Palliative Care Hospital & Hospice, a palliative care charitable non-governmental organisation based in Lucknow, India.

He is the secretary general of Association of International Doctors.

In 2022, Shukla was elected to state council (Rajya Parishad) for senior citizens, Uttar Pradesh. He is also the fellow of Royal College of Physicians, Edinburgh.

== Early life and education ==
Shukla was born in Lucknow, Uttar Pradesh. He commenced his early schooling at Wynberg Allen School in Mussoorie, He completed his Doctor of Medicine (Physician) with Gold Medals in 9 subjects in year 2000, rotatory internship from King George's Medical University, Lucknow in 2001, in the year 2003 he completed his training in critical care medicine from SGPGI, Lucknow, followed by post graduate diploma in disability management in 2007 from (Manipal academy of higher education), post graduate diploma in geriatric care in 2008, Certification in Palliative medicine from Cardiff University Wales in year 2013, followed by postgraduate diploma in clinical endocrinology & diabetes in year 2017, UK.

In 2010, Shukla has been awarded a Commonwealth Scholarship Commission (CSC) scholarship to study palliative medicine at Cardiff University in the United Kingdom. Dr. Shukla is likely to be among the first few to get the honor.

Shukla is MD (Gold Medalist), Diploma disability management & geriatric care, member American association of family physicians (USA) and honored Fellow of Royal College of Physicians of Edinburgh in 2022.

In October 2023, Shukla has been invited by Cardiff University, Cardiff, United Kingdom for a super specialty course in Clinical Geriatrics.

In 2026, Dr. Shukla has been selected for the Doctor of Philosophy (PhD) in Palliative Care at the University of Maryland, Baltimore (USA).

== Work and charity ==
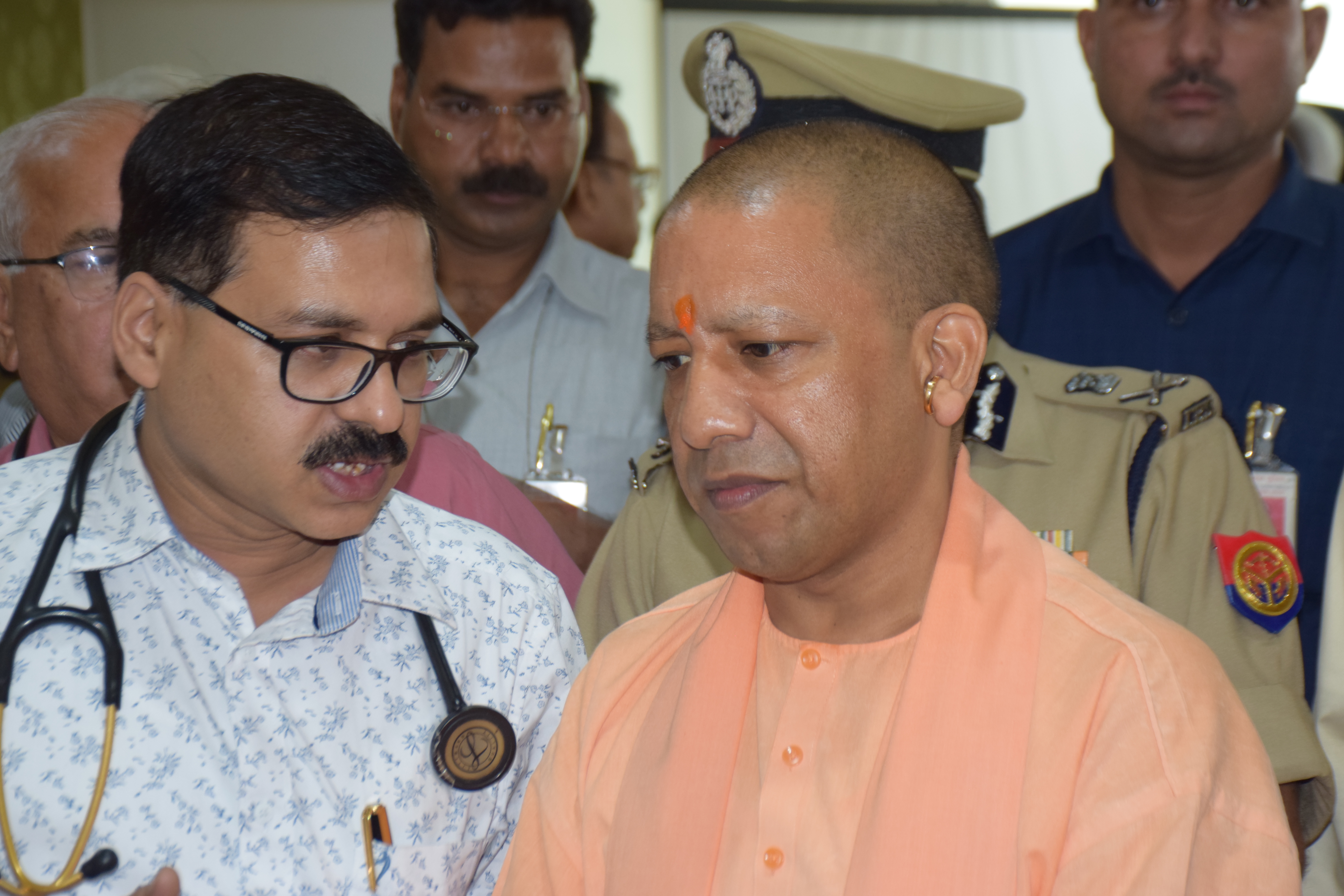
Dr. Abhishek Shukla is with Chief Minister Yogi Adityanath in 2019

Shukla started a charity named Aastha Centre for Geriatric Medicine, Palliative Care Hospital & Hospice, a palliative care non-governmental organisation formed in 2003 and based in Lucknow, India. He has served many needy people & families facing grief due to loss of loved ones under the organization.

In October 2019, Uttar Pradesh Police introduced an initiative called 'Savera' for senior citizens. Shukla lead the endeavour in collaboration with UP 112 services.

In 2022, Prime minister Narendra Modi praised Shukla:

"Saving lives is crucial, especially during global pandemic. Our vaccination programme has left none behind and showed that New India excels in last mile delivery. The scale and speed that India imparted to the world's largest vaccination programme have been spectacular and this has happened due to the efforts of people like you. On this historic occasion, I applaud your contribution to India's COVID-19 Vaccination Programme."

Shukla is the President of Sri Sachidanand Nishkam Seva Trust, a charitable organization of religious trust.

Dr. Abhishek Shukla visited several distinguished hospices as a part of his training program. These hospices included Sobell House Hospice in Oxford. He learned from such experts as Dr. Robert Twycross, who served as the Director of the World Health Organization's collaborating Centers for Palliative Care and, in 2004, Dame Cicely Mary Strode Saunders, of St Christopher's Hospice in South London.

In March 2024, Dr. Shukla was invited by the Department of Social Welfare for policy dialogue for senior citizens.

In October 2024, Shukla appointed as an Executive Editor in South Asian Journal of Geriatric Medicine. Surgery, Palliative Care and Hospice.

In 2025, Dr. Shukla received an invitation to participate in an international observership and training program in Switzerland. He will visit three institutes: 1. La Maison de Tara, Chêne-Bougeries, Geneva 2. Inselspital, Bern University Hospital, and 3. University Hospital Zurich.

In June 2025, Dr Shukla was appointed as member of the National Institute of Social Defence (NISD) Steering Committee, Ministry of Social Justice and Empowerment, Government of India.

In April 2026, After a major fire tragedy in the slum area of Vikas Nagar, Lucknow, Dr Abhishek Shukla stepped forward to support the victims by providing essential items. Under “Giving Saturday” initiative, his centre launched a week-long relief campaign to assist the affected families.

On 20 May 2026, Dr. Abhishek Shukla was invited by the Government of India to speak in New Delhi on the topic, “Understanding the Care Economy: Financing Long-Term Care (LTC).”

== Awards and honours ==
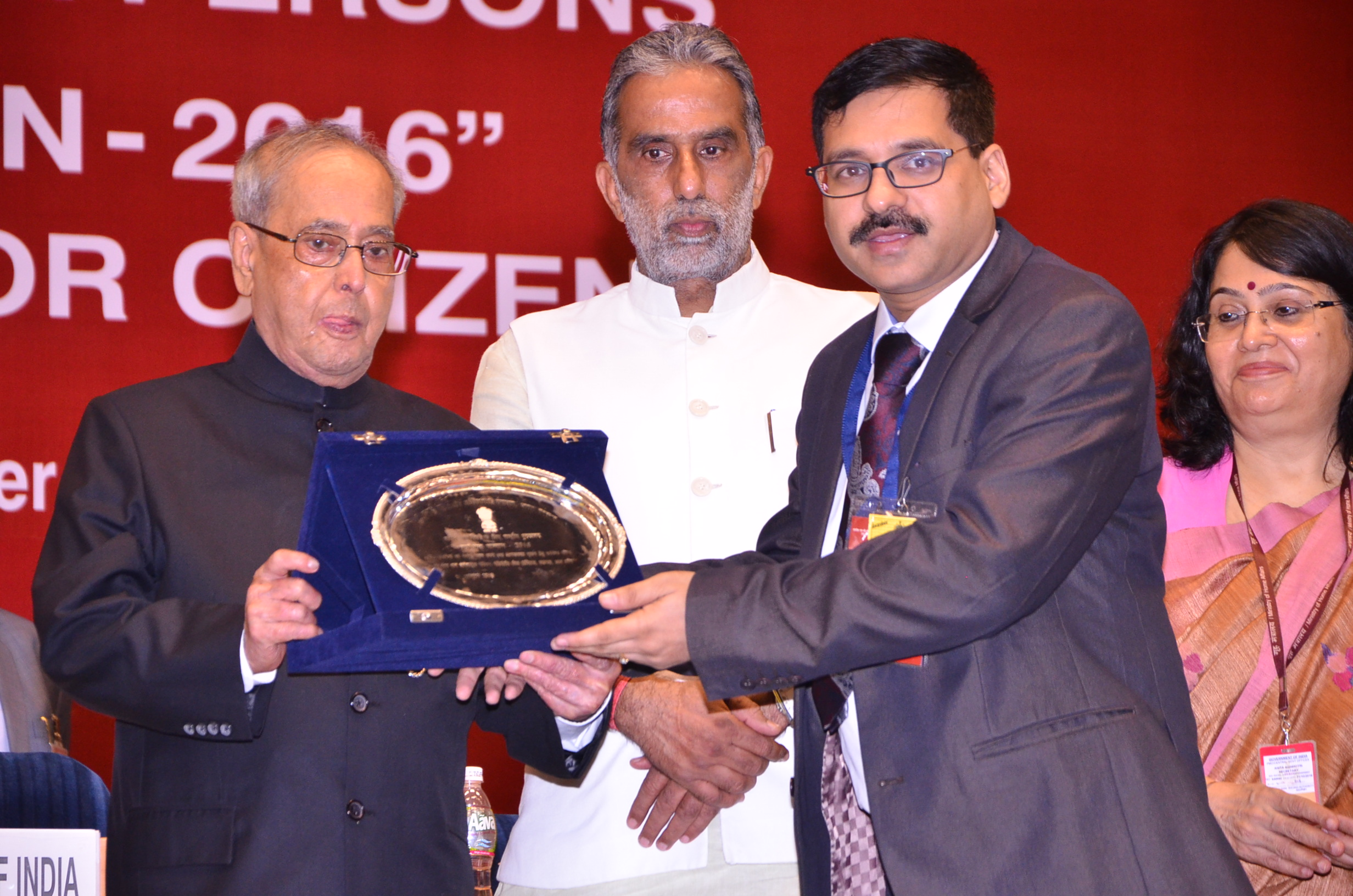
Dr. Abhishek Shukla receiving National Award from President of India Sri Pranab Mukherjee in 2016

Shukla has received 34 medical excellence awards, including the national award from the President of India and an appreciation letter from Prime Minister Narendra Modi for his work for the senior citizens.

- In November 2024, Dr. Abhishek Shukla was conferred with the Icons of Health Award by Times Of India Group, award presented by Ho. Deputy Chief Minister of Uttar Pradesh, Shri Brajesh Pathak, a recognition of his unparalleled contributions to the field of geriatric care, palliative medicine, and disability rehabilitation.
- In 2024, Dr. Shukla received letters of gratitude for his efforts from President of Spain (Pedro Sánchez) and Chief Minister of Gujarat (Bhupendrabhai Patel).
- Shukla was awarded the Fellowship in Geriatrics, by Geriatric Society of India on 16 December 2023 at Mangalore.
- In July 2023, Shukla received felicitation certificate for Aastha Old Age Home. The certification was provided by King George's Medical University.
- In June 2023, Shukla felicitated with HT Digital Streams Medical Excellence Award for his contribution towards healthcare and society. The award was given by Deputy chief minister Brajesh Pathak.
- In 2022, Shukla honored with Royal College of Physicians fellowship.
- In 2017, Shukla received appreciation letter from Prime minister Narendra Modi for his outstanding work for the society.
- In 2016, Shukla felicitated with national award 'Vayoshreshtha Samman' from President of India Sri Pranab Mukherjee.

== Notable Bibliography and publications ==
- "Autism Spectrum Disorders: How Much Do We Know About It?", 2023, p;127, ASIN:B0CNXGYDYC, Abhishek Shukla, Priyanka Sharma, Abhinav Pandey
- "Prevalence and determinants of cognitive impairment in an elderly population: A hospital based study", 2023, vol:10, Abhishek Shukla, Amita Shukla, Pankhuri Misra
- "Prevalence and Correlates of Hyponatremia in Critically Ill Elderly patients at the time of Admission, its impact on clinical course of ICU in a specialized geriatric facility in northern India", 2023, Abhishek Shukla, Amita Shukla & Pankhuri Misra
- "Clinical and Microbial Profile of Onychomycosis in Elderly Patients", 2023, Dr. Abhishek Shukla MD FRCP, Dr. Amita Shukla MS, Ms. Pankhuri Misra, vol:6, page:493-498
- "Exploring the Psychosocial Issues in Brain Cancer Patients during Initial Treatment Stages"; 2025; Karthikeyan K, Abhishek Shukla, Prateek Aggarwal, Nyalam Ramu, Ish Kapila, Parijatham S; vol-4
- "Enhancing Quality of Life for Cancer Patients Through Innovations in Palliative Care"; 2025; Smitha Madhavan, Abhishek Shukla, Gujjala Srinath, Bharat Bhushan, Anchal Gupta, Salini R; Vol:4
- "An Evaluation of Feedback and Family Satisfaction to Hospice Care Services"; 2026; Shukla Abhishek; P: 30-34
