= Robert Twycross =

British physician and writer (1941–2024)

- Born: 29 January 1941; West Bridgford, Nottinghamshire, England
- Died: 20 October 2024 (aged 83)
- Education: Oxford University
- Occupation(s): Physician, writer

Robert Geoffrey Twycross (29 January 1941 – 20 October 2024) was a British physician and writer. He was a pioneer of the hospice movement during the 1970s, when he helped palliative care gain recognition as an accepted field of modern medicine.

== Education and early achievements ==
Twycross was educated at St John's School, Leatherhead, and graduated from Oxford University with a BM BCh in 1965. After completing his MRCP, in 1971 he was appointed a Clinical Research Fellow at St Christopher's Hospice by Dame Cicely Saunders.

During his tenure there, Twycross completed studies on the effectiveness of morphine, diamorphine and methadone in managing cancer pain. These studies helped standardize and simplify the treatment of pain, eliminating more complicated treatments such as the Brompton cocktail. This research led to Dr. Twycross being awarded the University of Oxford higher degree of Doctor of Medicine.

== Later career and international influence ==
Twycross served as the Director of the World Health Organization's Collaborating Centre for Palliative Care from 1988 to 2005, which signalled a period of extensive travel and teaching around the world, most notably to Poland, India, and Argentina. He also served for 25 years at Sir Michael Sobell House in Oxford, from 1976 to 2001, first as the NHS Medical Director and later as Clinical Reader in Palliative Medicine, Oxford University, and Consultant Physician. In 1996 he was elected Fellow of the Royal College of Radiologists "for services to medicine", the first physician to be elected from the field of palliative medicine and hospice care. Dr Twycross retired from Oxford University and the National Health Service in 2001. He was appointed a trustee of the Foundation for Palliative Care Education (PACED) in 2019.

== Palliativedrugs.com ==
In 2000, Twycross, along with Dr Andrew Wilcock, founded palliativedrugs.com Ltd, to provide "essential independent information for health professionals worldwide about drugs used in palliative and hospice care." at www.palliativedrugs.com where the information from the Palliative Care Formulary is available on-line. The website has received positive reviews, and had some 30,000 registered members in 169 countries in 2018, when the company was taken over by the Royal Pharmaceutical Society. The 6th edition of the Palliative Care Formulary was published in October 2017.

== Death ==
Twycross died on 20 October 2024, at the age of 83.

== Honours ==
- Plaque of Honour, Indian Association of Palliative Care, 2012
- Honorary membership of the Polish Society for Palliative Medicine, 2011
- Lifetime Achievement Award, American Academy of Hospice and Palliative Medicine, 2008
- Lifetime Achievement Award, Indian Association of Palliative Care, 2008
- Vittorio Ventafridda Award, International Association for Hospice & Palliative Care, 2006
- Fellow of the Royal College of Radiologists, 1996
- Sertürner Award, Germany, 1995
- Founder's Award, National Hospice Organization, 1994
- Aid and Cooperation Medal, Ministry of Health and Social Welfare, Poland, 1993
