= Stephen Connor (psychologist) =

American clinical health psychologist

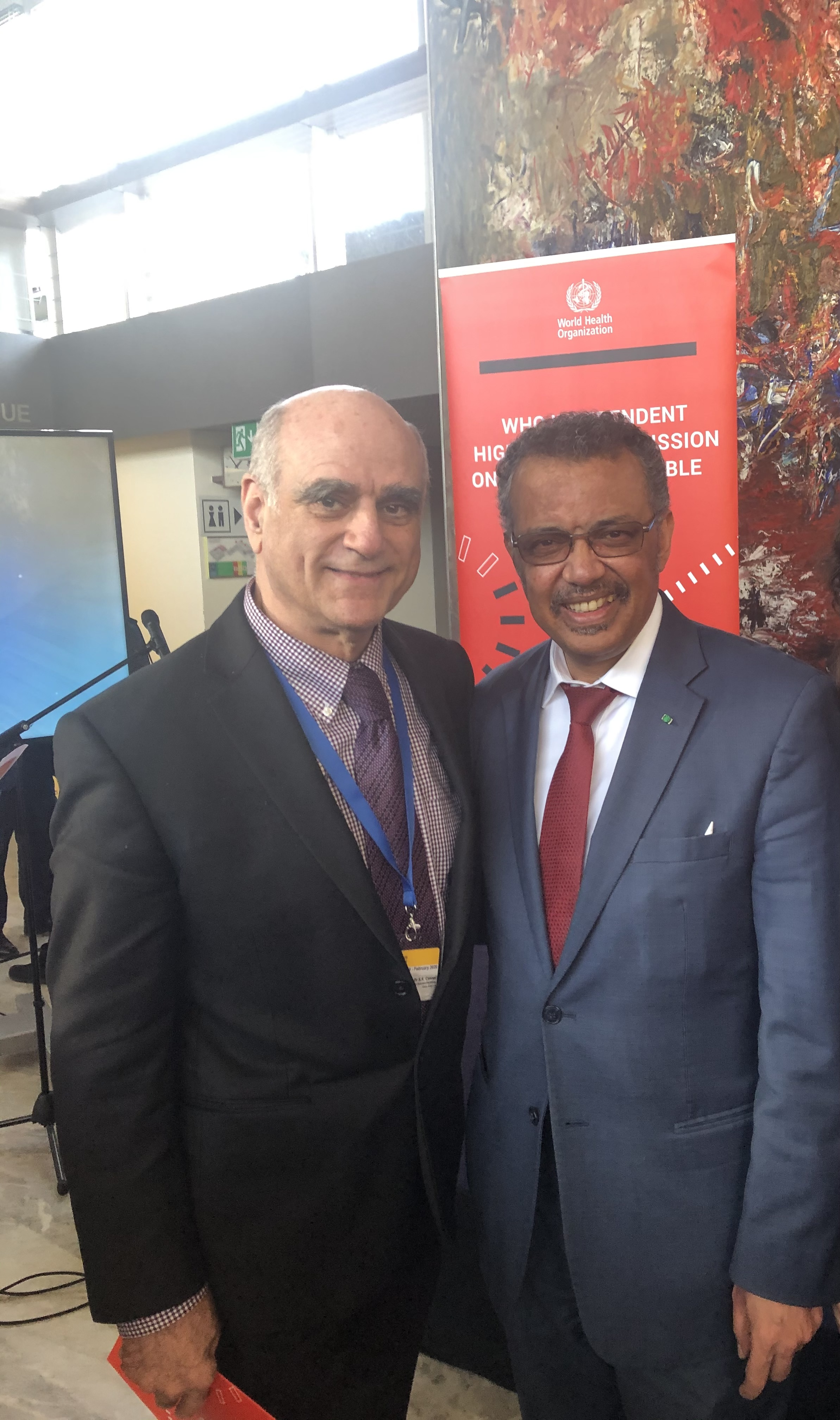
Stephen Connor (left) with Tedros Adhanom Ghebreyesus (right), Director-General of the World Health Organization, at a WHO Executive Board Meeting in February 2020

Stephen Robert Connor (born 29 December 1950) is an American licensed clinical health psychologist, researcher, author, executive and palliative care consultant. He is the executive director of the Worldwide Hospice Palliative Care Alliance (WHPCA), formerly called the Worldwide Palliative Care Alliance (WPCA). From 1998 to 2008 he served as Vice President of Research and Development at the National Hospice and Palliative Care Organization (NHPCO). He has promoted global initiatives for hospice and end-of-life care programs through the World Health Assembly. He has also addressed the UN General Assembly on the need for greater pain management in palliative care.

== Career ==
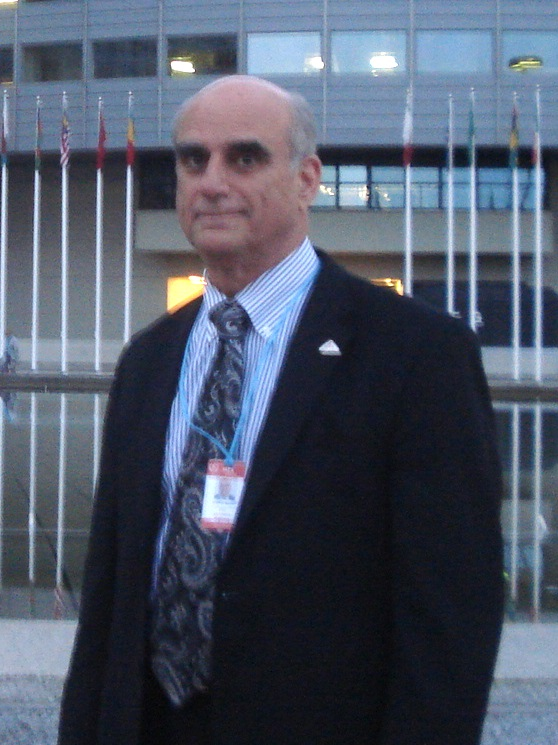
Connor at the Global Summit on International Breast Health at the United Nations Office at Vienna, Austria, 2012

Connor worked as CEO of four US hospice programs from 1976 to 1998. From 1998 to 2009 he was Vice President of Research and Development at the National Hospice and Palliative Care Organization. He is the executive director of the Worldwide Hospice Palliative Care Alliance (WHPCA), which has established organizational ties between national and regional hospice programs throughout the world. Connor is also a consultant senior research scholar at Capital Care based in the Washington metropolitan area, and serves as a board member of the International Work Group on Death, Dying, and Bereavement, the Association for Death Education and Counseling, and the Scientific Advisory Board of the US National Palliative Care Research Center.

Connor is a member of the editorial board of the Journal of Pain and Symptom Management. Since 2012 he has been a member of the board of trustees for the International Children's Palliative Care Network, which is represented in the board of the WHPCA. As of 2016 he has served on the board of directors for the Elisabeth Kübler-Ross Foundation.

As a member of WHPCA, Connor edited a joint publication with the World Health Organization (WHO) entitled Global Atlas of Palliative Care at the End of Life (2014). He was also instrumental in the passage of a palliative care resolution at the World Health Assembly (WHA). As of 2019 Connor has published five major books on palliative care.

== Positions ==
Connor discussing pain relief in palliative care with the BBC World News in a special report (video), 2013

In regards to the right to medical care (including palliative care) in Article 25 of the Universal Declaration of Human Rights, Connor implored the UN General Assembly to provide adequate medical use of controlled substances without their misuse, calling access to pain relief "a global crisis." Connor asserts that the World Health Assembly's 2014 resolution entitled "Strengthening Palliative Care as a component of Comprehensive Care Throughout the Life Course" is undermined by the pernicious lack of access to analgesics and medical opioids in some countries where stronger technical assistance and public education programs should be required.

To emphasize the growing need for palliative care, Connor has highlighted the fact that globally as of 2015 there are more people over the age of 65 than under the age of 5. Connor has also stressed that global healthcare's greatest problem is the almost exclusive attention given to acute care rather than chronic care of patients.

== Works ==
- Hospice: Practice, Pitfalls, and Promise (1998)
- Hospice and Palliative Care, the Essential Guide (2009) [third edition, 2017]
- Global Atlas of Palliative Care at the End of Life (2014)
- Building Integrated Palliative Care Programs and Services (2017)

== See also ==
- American Academy of Hospice and Palliative Medicine
- Hospice care in the United States
- List of clinical psychologists
