= Aastha Hospice & Geriatric Care Centre =

Organisation in Lucknow, India

Aastha Centre for Geriatric Medicine Palliative Care Hospital and Hospice
- Formation: 2003
- Founder: Dr. Abhishek Shukla
- Founded at: Lucknow, Uttar Pradesh, India
- Legal status: Registered Charity, Hospice, Geriatric Hospital
- Purpose: Humanitarian, Geriatric
- Location: Lucknow, India
- Coordinates: 26.882153°N 80.950353°E
- Services: Geriatric clinics, outpatient facility, acute medical care, intensive care, Long-term care for bed-ridden patients, rehabilitation
- Secretary: Dr. Abhishek Shukla
- Key people: Dr. Abhishek Shukla; Dr. Sandeep Kumar; Dr. Atul Kumar Roy; Dr. Rajendra Prasad; Dr. V K Puri; Dr. Amita Shukla; Dr. Ram Pratap Singh; Dr. Sanjay Makheeja; Dr. Mohit Mohan Singh; Dr. Deen Bandhu Prasad; Dr. Kusum Dube; Dr. Avik Roy; Dr. Abhishek Kumar Singh; Dr. Rashmi Kumar; Dr. Rakesh Jalota; Dr. Nirupma Jaiswal
- Staff: 130 (Approx.) (2026)
- Volunteers: 1200
- Website: hospiceindia.org

Aastha Hospice & Geriatric Care Centre is an Indian charitable organisation and research institute located at Aliganj in Lucknow, India. It provides specialised geriatric services for elderly patients. One of the services provided is an old age shelter home at its Aastha Old Age Home Resort.

== History ==
Aastha Centre for Geriatric Medicine, Palliative Care Hospital & Hospice was established in 2006 by Dr. Abhishek Shukla. Shukla received a letter of gratitude from Prime Minister Narendra Modi for his work on behalf of his organisation.

== Services ==
The organisation provides specialised geriatric services for the elderly and also provides hospital services like geriatric clinics, acute medical care, intensive care, long-term care for bed-ridden patients and stroke victims, supportive care, cancer treatment, care and treatment of mentally ill patients, rehabilitation requiring fractures and joint replacements, home health care, and dementia care.

In the 2024 Lok Sabha Elections, the Aastha organization provided free ambulance service to cast votes for Senior Citizens who are confined to bed.

The organization also runs various public campaigns, including:

1. Giving Saturday campaign, an initiative to support the underprivileged.
2. Fashion show for the elderly.
3. Observation of International Day of older persons.
4. Environmental protection awareness programme.
5. Observation of World Bone and Joint Day.

== Philanthropy ==
"Sehat ka Utsav" Free Medical Camp and Seminar on health ageing organized by Aastha Geriatric Centre and the South Asian Journal of Geriatric Medicine, Surgery, Palliative Care & Hospice on 8 December 2024. Inaugurated by Mr. Asim Arun, Minister, and Justice Rajeev Singh from Allahabad High Court.

In April 2026, After a major fire tragedy in the slum area of Vikas Nagar, Lucknow, Aastha Hospice & Geriatric Care Centre stepped forward to support the victims by providing essential items. Under its “Giving Saturday” initiative, the centre launched a week-long relief campaign to assist the affected families.

== Recognition and Awards ==
1. Icons of Health Award by Governor of Uttar Pradesh Ram Naik in 2016.
2. "Best institution for providing services to the senior citizens" National Award "Vayoshreshtha Samman" in 2016 by President of India Pranab Mukherjee.
3. In July 2023, King George's Medical University, Lucknow, honoured the organisation for promoting body donation.
