= BJSM =

BJSM may refer to:

- British Journal of Sexual Medicine
- British Journal of Sports Medicine
- British Joint Staff Mission
