= WPCA =

WPCA may refer to:

- WPCA (AM), a radio station (800 AM) licensed to Waupaca, Wisconsin, United States
- WPCA-LP, a low-power radio station (93.1 FM) licensed to Amery, Wisconsin, United States
- World Professional Chuckwagon Association
- Former name for the Worldwide Hospice and Palliative Care Alliance (WHPCA)
- WPHL-TV, a MyNetworkTV-affiliated television station in Philadelphia, Pennsylvania, United States which previously used the WPCA-TV callsign from 1960 to 1962
