= Thelma Bates =

Thelma Bates may refer to:

- Thelma Bates (character), a character in the British drama series Hex
- Thelma Bates (physician) (1929–2023), British oncologist

== See also ==
- Thelma Bate (1904–1984), Australian activist
