= Balfour Mount =

Canadian physician, surgeon and academic (1939–2025)

- Born: 14 April 1939; Ottawa, Ontario, Canada
- Died: 25 September 2025 (aged 86); Montreal, Quebec, Canada
- Known for: Being a pioneer of palliative care in North America
- Awards: Order of Canada; National Order of Quebec

Balfour M. Mount, OC OQ (14 April 1939 – 25 September 2025) was a Canadian physician, surgeon and academic. He was considered the "father of palliative care in North America".

== Life and career ==
Born in Ottawa, Ontario on 14 April 1939, Mount received his medical degree from Queen's University in 1963 and studied surgery and urology at McGill University. In January 1973, Dr. Mount, an urologic-cancer surgeon, was influenced by a discussion group of Elisabeth Kubler-Ross' book On Death and Dying to lead a study of the conditions at Montreal's Royal Victoria Hospital. After visiting Cicely Saunders' St. Christopher's Hospice, he helped to create a similar ward within the Royal Victoria Hospital in 1974 and coined the term "palliative care". He became the founding Director of the Royal Victoria Hospital Palliative Care Service, the Palliative Care McGill in 1990 and the McGill Programs in Integrated Whole Person Care in 1999. Dr. Mount was the Eric M. Flanders Emeritus Professor of Palliative Care at McGill University. In 1976 he established the International Congress on Palliative Care, held every two years in Montreal to this day.

In 2021, he published his memoirs, Ten Thousand Crossroads: The Path as I Remember It.

Mount died in the palliative care unit that bears his name at the Royal Victoria Hospital of the McGill University Health Centre, on 25 September 2025, at the age of 86.

== Honours ==
In 1985, Mount was made a Member of the Order of Canada in recognition for having "founded the first Palliative Care Service at Montreal's Royal Victoria Hospital". In 2003, he was promoted to Officer in recognition of being "the father of palliative care in North America". In 1988, he was made an Officer of the National Order of Quebec. He also received an award from the American Academy of Hospice and Palliative Medicine for his lifetime achievements, as well as the Queen Elizabeth II Diamond Jubilee Medal. In 2020, he was one of six Canadian scientists and doctors to feature on stamps issued by the Canadian Post Office.

He has been awarded honorary degrees from the University of Calgary, Queen's University, and Dalhousie University.
