= That Good Night: Life and Medicine in the Eleventh Hour =

2019 memoir by Sunita Puri

That Good Night
- First edition (US)
- Author: Sunita Puri
- Language: English
- Genre: Autobiography
- Published: March 5, 2019
- Publisher: Viking Press (US); Constable (UK)
- Publication place: United States
- Pages: 320
- ISBN: 9780735223325

That Good Night: Life and Medicine in the Eleventh Hour is a 2019 memoir written by Sunita Puri, a palliative care physician who chronicles her experiences with helping terminally-ill patients and their family members make end-of-life decisions. She further explores the dichotomy between modern medicine and palliative care. Throughout the span of 13 chapters, Puri recounts clinical encounters involving both patients and professional colleagues, stories of her upbringing, and personal reflections about the field of palliative medicine. The book was published by Penguin Random House in 2019.

== Synopsis ==
That Good Night: Life and Medicine in the Eleventh Hour consists of 13 chapters divided into three parts titled Between Two Dark Skies, The Unlearning, and Infinity in a Seashell, respectively. Puri begins the memoir by recounting her time at the University of California San Francisco School of Medicine palliative care unit where she was completing her last few months of medical school. Part 1 of the memoir culminates with Puri being accepted into a fellowship program in palliative and hospice care at Stanford University while she finishes her last few months of residency in internal medicine at the University of California San Francisco School of Medicine. In Part 2, Puri transitions into her role as a fellow, which begins officially on July 1, 2013. In Part 3, Puri recounts her first job as an attending physician where she sees hospitalized patients in the morning before conducting patient home visits during the afternoon.

== Background ==
Puri is the daughter of two immigrants.

Puri's mother, an anesthesiologist, inspired Puri to complete her medical school training and internal medicine residency at the University of California San Francisco School of Medicine, where Puri's interests naturally gravitated towards palliative medicine and hospice care. Thus, Puri's personal outlook on mortality, coupled with her experiences in helping and talking to terminally-ill patients during her years in medical school, residency, and fellowship at Stanford University, ultimately drove her to write the memoir. During the development of the book, Puri consulted with professional colleagues, patients, and the family members of patients in order to properly recount yet preserve the identities of the individuals in her stories. While writing her memoir, Puri hoped that the situations described in the memoir might help others patients and families feel less alone in their navigations of mortality and end-of-life decisions.

As of 2019, Puri is medical director of USC's Palliative Medicine and Supportive Care Service at the Keck Hospital and Norris Cancer Center.
