= European Journal of Palliative Care =

- Discipline: Palliative care
- Language: English

Publication details
- History: 1994-2018
- Publisher: Hayward Medical Communications
- Frequency: Bimonthly

Standard abbreviations
- ISO 4: Eur. J. Palliat. Care

Indexing
- ISSN: 1352-2779 (print); 1479-0793 (web)

Links
- Journal homepage

The European Journal of Palliative Care is the official journal of the European Association for Palliative Care. It published articles on the latest advances in palliative care in Europe and facilitatated communication between healthcare professionals working in the field.

The founding editor was Geoffrey Hanks.

The last published issue is May/June 2018.
