= Courage: Eight Portraits =

2007 book by Gordon Brown

- Author: Gordon Brown
- Language: English
- Subject: Biography
- Genre: Non-fiction
- Publisher: Bloomsbury
- Publication date: 4 June 2007
- Publication place: United Kingdom
- Media type: Print (Harback)
- Pages: 288 pp
- ISBN: 978-0-7475-6532-1
- OCLC: 51623312

Courage: Eight Portraits is a non-fiction book by former British prime minister Gordon Brown. Published in 2007, it comprises short biographical accounts of the lives of eight notable individuals, drawn together as an exploration of the concept of courage.

The eight subjects of the book are Aung San Suu Kyi, Dietrich Bonhoeffer, Edith Cavell, Robert Kennedy, Martin Luther King Jr., Nelson Mandela, Cicely Saunders, and Raoul Wallenberg.

== Background ==
The book was written during Brown's tenure as Chancellor of the Exchequer and was first published on 4 June 2007, three weeks before he became prime minister. In his acknowledgements, Brown writes that he began to write the book as a means of raising funds for the Jennifer Brown Research Fund, set up in memory of Brown's daughter Jennifer Jane, who was born prematurely in December 2001 and died in January 2002. The book is dedicated "in memory of Jennifer".

Brown was a surprise guest at the 2008 Edinburgh Book Festival where he spoke about Courage and told audiences that he had chosen to write the book to encourage people to emulate the eight figures whose stories it included.

== Reception ==
Courage: Eight Portraits received mixed reviews on publication. Catherine Bennett of The Guardian felt that the book was “hagiographic” and “sermonising”, criticising Brown's authorship as “didactic” and “pious”. A review in Prospect magazine by Kamran Nazeer, though, explicitly declared the book to be “no hagiography”, although it “does not aspire to present a balanced or critical view”, and links Brown's decision to write it and his choice of some subjects to his experiences of the loss of his daughter Jennifer. Philip Gould, also writing for The Guardian, was positive: the book is “very moving and completely uncynical”, he wrote, and shows that Brown “seeks to become a politician who empowers”. Jonathan Freedland, reviewing Courage for The New York Review of Books, was critical of “sloppy editing” and speculated that the real intent behind the book – and its publication date – was to associate Brown with some of the “moral giants of recent history”, but also felt that “no British prime minister since Churchill has written anything quite as good, at least not while in active politics”. Geoffrey Wheatcroft in The London Review of Books and Simon Jenkins in The Times were both fiercely critical of the book, Brown's motives in writing it, and the quality of his prose.

=== Choice of subjects ===
Simon Jenkins, in The Times, complained that there were "no soldiers and no Englishmen", commenting that the choices of Dietrich Bonhoeffer and Cicely Saunders were "surprising". The palliative care and anti-euthanasia charity Care Not Killing welcomed the inclusion of Saunders as one of Brown's eight subjects, for her role in improving palliative care and public attitudes towards it.

=== Sales ===
According to The Independent, the book had sold almost 4,200 copies by March 2010.
