= Worldwide Hospice Palliative Care Alliance =

Healthcare organization

Worldwide Hospice and Palliative Care Alliance (WHPCA)
- Formation: 2008
- Type: Implementing NGO
- Headquarters: London, United Kingdom
- Members: Over 200 affiliate organizations representing over 90 countries
- Key people: Stephen Connor (Executive Director)

The Worldwide Hospice Palliative Care Alliance or WHPCA (formerly known as the Worldwide Palliative Care Alliance or WPCA) is an international non-governmental organization based in the United Kingdom. In official relations with the World Health Organization (WHO), the WHPCA works in conjunction with over 200 regional institutions and national partners for the global development of palliative care and advancement of pain relief. It advocates for changes in public policy on accessibility of pain relief in end-of-life care and integration of palliative care into national health agendas. In 2014 it released the Global Atlas of Palliative Care at the End of Life in a joint publication with the WHO.

== History ==
The WHPCA was founded in 2008 with its headquarters located in the United Kingdom. The non-governmental organization (NGO) is registered as a charity in England and Wales. WHPCA is an implementing NGO affiliated with the World Health Organization (WHO) promoting change in public policies for hospice and palliative care on a global, national, and regional scale. The organization has also been recognized as having official relations with the United Nations Economic and Social Council. Clinical health psychologist and co-founder Stephen Connor serves as the executive director.

The WHPCA works in conjunction with other international organizations and national entities. For instance, it collaborated with the African Palliative Care Association (APCA) for presenting materials to an international palliative care conference in 2016 hosted by the Uganda Ministry of Health. WHPCA has partnered with organizations such as the Centre for Palliative Care in Bangladesh (established by the Bangabandhu Sheikh Mujib Medical University [BSMMU] in 2011) to improve the quality of end-of-life care for elderly and pediatric patients suffering from terminal diseases. With a grant provided by UK Aid, WHPCA partnered with the Department of Palliative Medicine at BSMMU in 2018–2019 to provide palliative care to impoverished patients of Narayanganj District, Bangladesh, treating over 100 patients and training 27 nurses and 17 doctors in administering palliative care.

== Priorities and projects ==
Along with its international partners, the WHPCA seeks to provide pain relief to patients suffering chronic illnesses. The organization works to eliminate the stigma surrounding pain relief by challenging certain national public policies, especially in developing countries where prescribed opioid use is controversial due to drug addiction. One of the other major priorities of the organization is to make quality palliative care more affordable. It has also managed the annual World Hospice and Palliative Care Day to raise awareness about its initiatives.

In 2014 the WHPCA and WHO produced a joint publication, the Global Atlas of Palliative Care at the End of Life, edited by Stephen Connor and Maria Cecilia Sepulveda Bermedo, a senior adviser on chronic diseases prevention and management for the WHO. It was initiated as part of the WHO's Global Action Plan for the Prevention and Control of Noncommunicable Diseases for 2013–2020. The study found that roughly 20 million people around the globe, 6% of whom were children, required end-of-life palliative care, with a majority of those in developing countries lacking basic necessities such as opioid medication for pain relief.

== Published material ==
- Global Atlas of Palliative Care at the End of Life (2014)
- eHospice, annual international edition

== See also ==
- Hospice care in the United States
- Palliative sedation
