= Mary Baines =

British physician (1932–2020)

Mary Jean Baines, OBE née Silver (29 October 1932 – 21 August 2020) was a British palliative care physician. Alongside her colleague Dame Cicely Saunders, she has been called one of the founders of the palliative care movement. She worked at St Christopher's Hospice in London from 1968 to 1997, and from there she established the United Kingdom's first community-based end-of-life care service.

== Early life ==
Baines was born in Wallington, Surrey, on 29 October 1932 to Mary (née Tripe) and John Silver. She attended Croydon High School, followed by Newnham College, Cambridge, before graduating from St Thomas's Hospital Medical School in 1957.

== Career ==
Baines began her medical career in the casualty department of St Thomas' Hospital in London. She later became a general practitioner in South London. In 1967, she was contacted by her former St Thomas's classmate Cicely Saunders, who had founded St Christopher's Hospice, inviting her to work at the hospice. Although Baines initially found the concept of palliative care "very odd, this idea of caring for the dying", she ultimately decided to join Saunders in 1968 because of her own Christian faith and ideals. At St Christopher's, Baines established the home-based care team for palliative patients in the United Kingdom; this service provided 24-hour care to patients at home by doctors and nurses.

Baines trained many of the UK's first generation of specialist palliative care physicians. Since there was a paucity of published research in the field of palliative care, she became a researcher herself, and developed the now-standard regimen of treatment for nausea and vomiting caused by bowel obstruction. Baines and Saunders co-wrote Living With Dying: The Management of Terminal Disease (published 1983), the first textbook on palliative care, followed by numerous other textbook chapters. In their writing they argued in favour of giving patients regular pain relief every four hours rather than only when requested.

Baines was an adviser to the World Health Organization, lectured internationally on palliative care, and was appointed an Officer of the Order of the British Empire (OBE) in 1991. She left St Christopher's in 1997 to work as part-time medical director of the Ellenor Hospice in Gravesend. She received a European Women of Achievement Award in 2006, at which time she was noted to be the world's longest serving hospice physician.

== Personal life ==
In 1958 she married Ted Baines, an Anglican clergyman, with whom she had three children. She died on 21 August 2020 at St Christopher's Hospice from complications of Parkinson's disease.
