= Geoffrey Hanks =

British palliative care specialist (1946–2013)

Professor Geoffrey Hanks FRCP, FRCPE, FFPM
- Born: 19 February 1946; Bangalore, India
- Died: 27 June 2013 (aged 67)

Professor Geoffrey Warren Hanks DSc(Med), FRCP, FRCPE, FFPM (1946–2013), also known as Geoff, was a British palliative care specialist.

Hanks was born in Bangalore, India, on 19 February 1946, the son of Kate, a housewife, and Frederick Condict Hanks, an accountant.

He attended Hackney Downs School, then studied medicine at University College Hospital Medical School, qualifying in 1970.

After working at University College Hospital, Nottingham General Hospital, in the pharmaceutical industry, and at the Oxford Regional Pain Unit, he was made consultant physician in charge of the Palliative Care Units at the Royal Marsden Hospital London and Surrey, and honorary senior lecturer in medicine at the Institute of Cancer Research from 1983 to 1991. He was also a senior lecturer and honorary consultant in the Department of Clinical Pharmacology at St Bartholomew's Hospital Medical College from 1986 to 1991.

He was then Sainsbury Professor of Palliative Medicine – the first ever chair of palliative medicine – at the United Medical and Dental Schools of Guys and St Thomas' Hospitals from 1991 until 1993, where he took over the country's oldest palliative care department from Thelma Bates. In 1993, he was appointed professor of palliative medicine at the University of Bristol, becoming emeritus there upon retirement in 2006. He was also a professor in the Department of Molecular Medicine and Cancer Research at the Norwegian University of Science and Technology in Trondheim.

He served as honorary president of the European Association for Palliative Care and as a vice-president of Macmillan Cancer Support.

He was senior editor of the Oxford Textbook of Palliative Medicine, founding editor of the European Journal of Palliative Care, and editor-in-chief of the journal Palliative Medicine from 2002 to 2012.

He was a Fellow of the Royal College of Physicians (FRCP), a Fellow of the Royal College of Physicians of Edinburgh (FRCPE), and a Fellow of the Faculty of Pharmaceutical Medicine, (FFPM).

He died on 27 June 2013.
