= Thelma Bates (physician) =

British oncologist (1929–2023)

Thelma Bates OBE
- Born: Thelma Dorothy Johnson; 18 August 1929; Newcastle-under-Lyme, Staffordshire, England
- Died: 10 June 2023 (aged 93)
- Other name: Thelma Dorothy Bates
- Education: University of Birmingham Medical School; Peter MacCallum Cancer Centre
- Medical career
- Institutions: St Thomas' Hospital
- Sub-specialties: Palliative care; Oncology

Thelma Dorothy Bates OBE (née Johnson; 18 August 1929 – 10 June 2023) was a British oncologist who established the first palliative care service at a British hospital.

== Early life ==
Thelma Dorothy Johnson was born on 18 August 1929 in Newcastle-under-Lyme as the second child of Cyril, who worked as a designer in tile manufacture, and Dorothy, a civil servant. She spent her early years in Bournemouth. After breaking her arm at the age of six, she was inspired to a lifelong interest in medicine. When the Second World War began the family moved back to Newcastle-under-Lyme. Thelma attended the Orme Girls' School, where her teachers attempted to dissuade her from medicine: the career was considered unwomanly and Thelma "not bright enough". She applied regardless, and got into the Birmingham Medical School, getting directly into the second year, and graduating in 1952. During the gap before the start of her medical studies, she worked as a nursing assistant at an orthopaedic hospital, and she had been in this role the day the National Health Service (NHS) came into being.

== Medical career ==
=== New Zealand and Australia ===
After her graduation she had an "irresistible urge" to travel, and tried to convince multiple shipping companies in Southampton to employ her as a ship's surgeon, despite the role at the time being typically filled by a male doctor. She was finally employed by Port Line as their first female ship's doctor, and sailed on a one-way trip to Auckland. She worked as a locum general practitioner across New Zealand before undertaking a seven months' sailing trip across a number of Pacific islands.

In 1956, she settled in Launceston, Tasmania, where, drawn by the regular hours of the job, she took a post in radiotherapy and oncology at the General Hospital. She obtained postgraduate qualifications in oncology from the Peter MacCallum Cancer Centre.

=== St Thomas' Hospital ===
She returned to England in 1965 and took up a post at St Thomas' Hospital, where she was appointed consultant oncologist in 1967 with a specialist interest in breast cancer. She ended up as the Director of the South East London Radiotherapy Centres in the 1980s, overseeing the management of radiotherapy in St Thomas', Guy's and King's College hospitals.

Her research interests included the effects of dose fractionation in radiotherapy, high-dose rate afterloading radiotherapies in gynaecological cancers, and leading an audit to investigate radiotherapy-induced injuries as a result of the campaign by Radiotherapy Action Group Exposure (RAGE). She was awarded the Röntgen Prize by the British Institute of Radiology in 1989.

=== Palliative care ===
Practising as an oncologist in the 1970s, Bates dealt with a high volume of dying patients, and noticed that her terminally ill patients were much more comfortable with the prospect of death at St Christopher's Hospice, run by Cicely Saunders. She visited the hospice and built ties with the staff, becoming the associated oncologist who would prescribe courses of palliative chemotherapy and radiotherapy for their patients. She visited St Luke's Hospital in New York in 1977, and observed the hospital-based palliative care team there, becoming convinced that such practice should be brought over to Britain. Her colleagues at the hospital were critical of her approach and warned her that looking into the "soft[er] option" of palliative care would ruin her career, but she was undeterred.

She set up the first hospital-based palliative care team in the United Kingdom in December 1977, titled the "St Thomas' Hospital Terminal Care Support Team", and composed of Bates, the oncology registrar, a nurse that had moved from St Christopher's Hospice, the hospital chaplain, and a part-time social worker. They provided advice upon referral from the medical teams looking after patients, but would not take over the full care of the patients. Bates had initially expected resistance to the idea from her colleagues and devised the advisory nature of the team as a result of her consultations with other physicians. In the event, the team's input allowed dying patients to be discharged and freed up hospital beds, and therefore proved popular. Over the next decade, twenty such teams were established across British hospitals. She retired in 1991, just as the first British academic palliative care department was established at St Thomas', with Geoffrey Hanks at the helm.

In 1981, Bates established the Princess Alice Hospice in land that she had bought in Esher, where she lived. She became a trustee and oversaw the design of the building. She was also involved in the international palliative care movement, serving as the President of the International Work Group on Death, Dying, and Bereavement.

== Personal life ==
Thelma married Mills Bates, an English ear, nose and throat surgeon, also living in Tasmania at the time, in 1960. Her daughter was born in 1961 with phocomelia, a set of limb abnormalities caused by the then-unknown effects of thalidomide consumption during pregnancy. This prompted the couple to eventually relocate to Britain. They later had two sons, one of whom who died in a house fire in 1991. Thelma and Mills divorced, and Thelma lived in Esher, Surrey, subsequently.

She died on 10 June 2023 of atrial fibrillation.
