= London Medical Group =

English medical ethics organisation

The London Medical Group (LMG) was a forum for the discussion of medical ethics issues set up by the Rev Edward Shotter in 1963. It was a forerunner of the Society for the Study of Medical Ethics (SSME), itself a forerunner of the Institute of Medical Ethics (IME). Dr (later Dame) Cicely Saunders gave one of the first lectures in the 1963/64 session on the subject of pain. The LMG published a series of papers under the title Documentation in Medical Ethics, considered to be the forerunner of the Journal of Medical Ethics.
