= Hayward Medical Communications =

British health organization

Hayward Medical Communications was a division of Hayward Group Limited. It was a UK-based medical communications agency and publisher, with offices in London and Newmarket.

Founded in 1991, Hayward Medical Communications had a portfolio of journals targeted at healthcare professionals and patients. The company also published multimedia products and services for the pharmaceutical industry, as well as for government agencies, charities and non-governmental organisations. Its services include consultancy, programme planning, professional training and health technology assessment submissions to the NHS agencies: the National Institute for Health and Clinical Excellence, the Scottish Medicines Consortium, and the All Wales Medicines Strategy Group.

Hayward Medical Communications was acquired by Prescript Communications in 2019. As of August 2022 its website directs viewers to Prescript.

== Publications ==
- ADHD in practice
- British Journal of Renal Medicine
- British Journal of Sexual Medicine
- Dermatology in practice
- European Journal of Palliative Care
- Managing pain in practice
- Myeloid disorders in practice
- Respiratory disease in practice
- Rheumatology in practice
- Thrombus
- Vaccines in practice
- Viral hepatitis in practice
