= Hospice care in the United States =

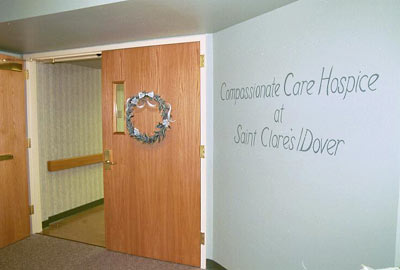
Exterior of an inpatient hospice unit

In the United States, hospice care is a type and philosophy of end-of-life care which focuses on the palliation of a terminally ill patient's symptoms. These symptoms can be physical, emotional, spiritual, or social in nature. The concept of hospice as a place to treat the incurably ill has been evolving since the 11th century. Hospice care was introduced to the United States in the 1970s in response to the work of Cicely Saunders in the United Kingdom. This part of health care has expanded as people face a variety of issues with terminal illness. In the United States, it is distinguished by extensive use of volunteers and a greater emphasis on the patient's psychological needs in coming to terms with dying.

Under hospice, medical and social services are supplied to patients and their families by an interdisciplinary team of professional providers and volunteers, who take a patient-directed approach to managing illness. Generally, treatment is not diagnostic or curative, although the patient may choose some treatment options intended to prolong life, such as CPR. Most hospice services are covered by Medicare or other providers, and many hospices can provide access to charitable resources for patients lacking such coverage.

With practices largely defined by the Medicare system, a social insurance program in the United States, and other health insurance providers, hospice care is made available in the United States to patients of any age with any terminal prognosis who are medically certified to have less than six months to live. In 2007, hospice treatment was used by 1.4 million people in the United States. More than one-third of dying Americans use the service. Common misperceptions regarding the length of time a patient may receive hospice care and the kinds of illnesses covered may result in hospice being underutilized. Although most hospice patients are in treatment for less than thirty days, and many for less than one week, hospice care may be authorized for more than six months given a patient's condition.

Care may be provided in a patient's home or in a designated facility, such as a nursing home, hospital unit or freestanding hospice, with level of care and sometimes location based upon frequent evaluation of the patient's needs. The four primary levels of care provided by hospice are routine home care, continuous care, general inpatient, and respite care. Patients undergoing hospice treatment may be discharged for a number of reasons, including improvement of their condition and refusal to cooperate with providers, but may return to hospice care as their circumstances change. Providers are required by Medicare to provide to patients notice of pending discharge, which they may appeal.

In other countries, there may not be the same distinctions made between care of those with terminal illnesses and palliative care in a more general setting. In such countries, the term hospice is more likely to refer to a particular type of institution, rather than specifically to care in the final months or weeks of life. End-of-life care is more likely to be included in the general term "palliative care".

== History and statistics ==
The first hospices are believed to have originated in the 11th century, when for the first time the terminally ill were permitted into places dedicated to treatment by Crusaders. In the early 14th century, the order of the Knights Hospitaller of St. John of Jerusalem opened the first hospice in Rhodes, meant to provide refuge for travelers and care for the ill and dying. The hospice practice languished until revived in the 17th century in France by the Daughters of Charity of Saint Vincent de Paul and, later, by the Irish Sisters of Charity, who opened St Joseph's Hospice in London, England in 1902. In the 1950s at St. Joseph's, Cicely Saunders developed many of the foundational principles of modern hospice care. She later founded St Christopher's Hospice in London.

In 1971, Hospice, Inc. was founded in the United States, the first organization to introduce the principles of modern hospice care to that country, where medical care had focused on fighting illness through hospital stays. In 1974, Florence Wald, along with two pediatricians and a chaplain, established the first hospice in the United States: Connecticut Hospice, located in Branford, Connectiut. Throughout the 1970s, the philosophies of hospice were being implemented throughout the United States. The hospice movement in the United States became distinguished from that in Britain, according to Stephen Connor's Hospice: Practice, Pitfalls and Promise, by "a greater emphasis on use of volunteers and more focus on psychological preparation for death". In 1982 Medicare, a social insurance program in the United States, added hospice services to its coverage. On September 13, 1982, by request of the senate, U.S. President Ronald Reagan proclaimed the week of November 7 through November 14, 1982, as National Hospice Week.

Since then, the hospice industry has rapidly expanded. This growth has accompanied the AIDS epidemic and the aging of the population, with related illnesses. By 1995, hospices were a $2.8 billion industry, with $1.9 billion from Medicare alone funding patients in 1,857 hospice programs with Medicare certification. In that year, 72% of hospice providers were non-profit. By 1998, there were 3,200 hospices either in operation or under development throughout the United States and Puerto Rico, according to the National Hospice and Palliative Care Organization (NHPCO). According to 2007's Last Rights: Rescuing the End of Life from the Medical System, hospice sites are expanding at a national rate of about 3.5% per year. In 2007, 1.4 million people in the United States used hospice, with more than one-third of dying Americans using the service, approximately 39%. In 2008, Medicare alone, which pays for 80% of hospice treatment, paid $10 billion to the 4,000 Medicare-certified providers in the United States. According to the 2017 National Hospice and Palliative Care Organizations Facts and Figures, 1.49 million Medicare beneficiaries were enrolled in hospice care for one day or more, which is 4.5% increase from the prior year. Other statistics from the 2017 report are as follows:

- 48.2 percent of Medicare beneficiaries who died in 2017 were enrolled in hospice at the time of death.
- 40.5 percent of patients received care for 14 days or less, while those receiving care for more than 180 days accounted for 14.1 percent.
- At 98.2 percent, Routine Home Care accounts for the vast majority of days of care.
- $18.99 billion was spent on hospice care by Medicare in 2017, representing an increase of 6.3 percent.
- Since 2014, beneficiaries identified as Asian and Hispanic increased by 32 percent and 21 percent respectively.

As the hospice industry has expanded, so has the concept of hospice care. In 2003 the first U.S. children's hospice facility, the George Mark Children's House Hospice, opened in San Francisco. In February 2009, Buffalo News reported that the balance of non-profit and for-profit hospices was shifting, with the latter as "the fastest-growing slice of the industry." A 2022 article in The New Yorker, argued that hospice had become a $22 billion industry "plagued by exploitation".

== Philosophy and practices ==
The goal of hospice agencies in the United States is to provide comfort to the patient and heighten quality of life. How comfort is defined is up to the patient or, if the patient is incapacitated, the patient's family. This can mean freedom from physical, emotional, spiritual and/or social pain. Hospices typically do not perform treatments that are meant to diagnose or cure an illness, and they do not seek to hasten death or, primarily or unduly, to extend life. While it is generally not required that patients sign "Do not resuscitate" (DNR) orders to be on hospice, some hospices require them as a condition of acceptance.

Many hospice patients, though not all, have made decisions against receiving CPR should their heart or breathing stop. If a patient does decide to request CPR, that service may not be provided by the hospice; the family may need to contact Emergency Medical Services to provide CPR. The principle of not extending life and withdrawing diagnostic or curative treatments is often the greatest barrier for patients in accepting hospice care. In some cases, medical professionals may feel conflict in attempting to provide it.

Some confusion still exists as to what treatments a patient may receive in hospice care. Hospices may provide treatments that have been traditionally regarded as curative, including radiation therapy or antibiotics, if these are administered to improve quality of life. Determination of appropriate treatment is made by medical personnel on an individual basis.

Another aspect of the hospice philosophy is that the care is patient-centered, to treat the whole patient. Many healthcare agencies in the U.S. market themselves as patient-centered; for hospice, this patient-directed care is integral and interwoven throughout the care which is provided. Related Medicare regulations reflect this philosophy.

=== Popular media ===
Hospice care in the United States was the subject of the Netflix 2018 Academy Award-nominated short documentary End Game, about terminally ill patients in a San Francisco hospital and Zen Hospice Project, featuring the work of palliative care physician BJ Miller and other palliative care clinicians. The film was executive produced by hospice and palliative care activist Shoshana R. Ungerleider.

== Hospice demographic ==
In order to qualify for hospice care, patients must have certification from two physicians that they have less than six months to live if their disease runs its natural course. Usually the patient's primary physician and the Hospice Medical Director provide this certification. Patients can and do stay on hospice longer than six months, and as long as the hospice team continues to certify with supporting evidence that the patient is terminal, insurance companies will usually continue to pay for hospice care.

Many physicians are slow to refer to hospice care, waiting until they are absolutely certain of a terminal prognosis. Some physicians believe that the patient must have a six-month prognosis or less to receive hospice care, while others are overly optimistic in their assessment of prognosis, presuming treatment will be more effective than it is. As a result, the majority of patients are referred to hospice in the very end-stages of their diseases, or choose that time to seek hospice care. The average length of stay in hospice before a patient dies was 26 days in 1994 and 19 days in 1998. Although the length of average stays has since increased, the term of care continues to be underused. In 2004 the average stay was 57 days and the median length was 22 days. 33% of hospice patients admitted in 2004 died within seven days of admission.

Such late admission is inconsistent with the process of hospice, which is to alleviate patient distress over a period of time, based on time for patients and family members to develop relationships with the hospice team.

Some people believe that only individuals suffering from cancer or AIDS can receive hospice care. Hospice in the United States developed around the model of cancer care, with a relatively predictable pattern of deterioration. According to 2002's The Case Against Assisted Suicide: For the Right to End-of-life Care, "60% of hospice patients have cancer." But, patients can be on hospice for numerous other illnesses, such as end-stage heart and lung diseases, stroke, renal failure, Alzheimer's disease, or many other conditions. Any diagnosis that would be an acceptable cause of death on a death certificate is, if expected to be terminal, an acceptable diagnosis for hospice care.

=== Re-certification ===
To qualify for hospice, a patient has to be certified as having a prognosis of less than 6 months to live. Sometimes patients live longer. Medicare patients who receive the hospice benefit must waive other Medicare benefits that could prolong life. Under the Medicare provisions, the hospice benefit through the first six months is broken up into two 90-day benefit periods. At the end of these two benefit periods, the hospice team will evaluate whether or not the patient continues to have a prognosis of less than six months to live. Following these two 90-day benefit periods, the hospice is required to evaluate more closely and review the case every 60 days. Commercial insurers, managed care program providers, and Medicaid often have their own regulations regarding re-certification. When the hospice re-certifies a six-month or less prognosis, this is based on the patient's current condition.

=== Pediatric hospice care ===
Patients in hospice have primarily been elderly; according to the 2006 Handbook of Social Work in Health and Aging, more than 80% of hospice patients in the United States are over 65. But hospice care is available to all age groups, including those under 21. Not all hospices are able to serve every population.

In 1983, less than 1% of hospice providers offered pediatric care; by 2001, that number had grown to 15%. The first pediatric hospice facility in the United States, the George Mark Children's House Hospice of San Francisco, opened in 2003. While pediatric hospice options are expanding, as of 2006 many adult-oriented hospice programs remained ill-prepared to handle younger populations.

The primary diagnosis for children in hospice treatment is cancer, but, like the adult population, children may enter hospice for a variety of conditions, including AIDS, prematurity, congenital disorder, cerebral palsy, cystic fibrosis, or "death-inducing trauma", such as automobile accidents. Hospice care, which is intended to treat the whole family, may also be made available to families expecting a child who is not anticipated to survive long after delivery.

The recommended model of hospice for children differs from that of adults. In 2000, the committees on Bioethics and Hospital Care for the American Academy of Pediatrics jointly released a recommendation that palliative care for children should be provided for any life-threatening condition from the point of diagnosis, whether death is the prognosis or not, as the benefits of palliative care can be offered concurrently with curative treatment. The Virginia-based Children's Hospice International also recommends hospice services for all children with life-threatening conditions, even if seeking "hopeful" treatment, "to enhance the quality of life for the child and family". However, the federal standards set by Medicaid require the six-months terminal prognosis. Insurance providers may restrict access to hospice care to pediatric patients undergoing life-extending treatment.

== Expense ==
The cost of hospice care may be met by health insurance providers, including Medicare or Medicaid for eligible Americans. Hospice is covered 100% with no co-pay or deductible by Medicare Part A except that patients are responsible for a copay for outpatient drugs and respite care, if needed. (Respite care may be necessary, for instance, if a family member who is providing home hospice care is briefly unable to perform his or her duties and an alternative care provider becomes necessary.) As of 2008, Medicare was responsible for around 80% of hospice payments, reimbursing providers differently from county to county with a higher rate for inpatient hospice care. A lower rate is paid for home care, with a higher rate paid for round-the-clock nursing care in order to get a patient's symptoms under control.

Most commercial health insurances and Medicaid have a hospice benefit as well. These typically are similar to the Medicare benefit. There may be a co-pay required by commercial health insurance providers depending on individual plans. According to a 2008 article by Lauren Tara LaCapra on TheStreet.com, Medicare and Medicaid paid 78% of home-based hospice charges in 2008, with 12% being supplied by private insurance providers and 10% "out of pocket", paid by the patient. Most non-profit hospice agencies have contingencies for patients who lack insurance coverage and will provide care to the patient free of charge or at reduced rates. LaCapra said that out-of-pocket expenses for home-based hospice services were $758 a year in 2008 for the average hospice patient.

Once a patient is enrolled in hospice, the hospice becomes the insurance payor for that patient for any hospice-related illnesses. In other words, if a patient is on hospice for end-stage congestive heart failure, the hospice is responsible for all care related to the heart failure. However, if the patient were to see a podiatrist, this would be billed through their regular insurance.

== Providers ==
Hospice is a competitive business. In any given service area, there may be hundreds of different non-profit and commercial providers. Hospices can be small community-based operations, part of regional and national corporations, or part of a hospital or other health system. Data from the National Hospice and Palliative Care Organization indicated that in 2008 58.3% of hospice agencies were independent, with 20.8% based in hospitals, 19.7% geared for home health care and 1.3% in conjunction with nursing homes. In 2007, the mean number of patients being treated in hospice facilities on any given day was 90.2. 79.4% of hospice providers admitted fewer than 500 patients per year. The number of for-profit and non-profit providers has become more balanced as the for-profit sector has grown. In 2007, 47.1% of agencies were for-profit, with 48.6% non-profit. The remaining 4.3% were government-owned providers.

In order to receive payments for hospice patients under Medicare or Medicaid, a hospice must be certified by the Centers for Medicare and Medicaid Services, and in 2007 93.1% were. Among those that were not certified, some were in the process of seeking certification. However, some agencies do not seek certification or voluntarily relinquish it. For one example, an agency that is entirely supported through donations or relies on volunteer staff might not choose to seek certification. The NHPCO estimated in 2008 that at least 200 "all-volunteer" programs were in operation in the United States.

== Levels of care ==
There are four primary levels of care; routine home care, continuous care, general inpatient and respite/respite inpatient. All hospices in the United States certified by Medicare are required to offer each of these levels of care.

=== Routine home care ===
Routine home care is the most common level of care provided. In spite of its title, routine home care does not indicate a location of care, but a level (or intensity) of care provided. Routine care may be provided at a nursing home or assisted living facility, although the majority of hospice patients are treated at home. Interdisciplinary team members supply a variety of services during routine home care, including offering necessary supplies, such as durable medical equipment, medications related to the hospice diagnosis and incidentals like diapers, bed pads, gloves, and skin protectants. Twenty-four-hour on-call services must be available as needed. Typically this is provided after normal business hours by a registered nurse prepared to address urgent patient concerns.

=== Continuous care ===
Continuous care is a service provided in the patient's home. It is for patients who are experiencing severe symptoms and need temporary extra support. Once a patient is on continuous care, the hospice provides services in the home a minimum of eight hours a day. Because the criteria for continuous care are similar to general inpatient care, and due to the challenges a hospice can face with staffing extended day care in the home, continuous care is intended to be used for short periods of time.

=== General inpatient care ===
General inpatient care is an intensive level of care which may be provided in a nursing home, a specially contracted hospice bed or unit in a hospital, or in a free-standing hospice unit. General inpatient criterion is for patients who are experiencing severe symptoms which require daily interventions from the hospice team to manage. Often, patients on this level of care have begun the "active phase" of dying, when their prognosis is measured in days as opposed to weeks or months. Although there is a limit to how long Medicare will cover this level of care, it is usually provided for brief periods of time, with five to seven days being the average.

=== Respite ===
Respite care (sometimes referred to as respite inpatient) is a brief and periodic level of care a patient may receive. Respite is a unique benefit in that the care is provided for the needs of the family, not the patient. Should a family member need a "break" from caregiving, or if a vacation is planned, then this level of care may be provided. During respite, the patient is transferred from the home to an institutional setting; this can be a nursing home, assisted living, hospital or an inpatient hospice unit. Should a patient be transferred to an assisted living facility, nursing home, or hospital, the hospice would continue to provide care to the patient which is on par with the services provided under the routine home care benefit. In this way, the only difference between respite and routine care is that the hospice pays the room and board charges of the facility. Should a patient receive respite in an inpatient hospice unit the care would be similar to what other patients of the hospice unit receive. Respite is provided for a maximum of five days every benefit period.

== Hospice interdisciplinary team ==
The hospice interdisciplinary team is the core service which every hospice provides to patients and families. Hospice differs from other forms of care in that the core members of the hospice team function as an interdisciplinary, rather than a multidisciplinary, team. Multidisciplinary teams involve several professionals who independently treat various issues a patient may have. The problems that are being treated may or may not relate to other issues being addressed by individual team members. Interdisciplinary team approach involves all members of the team working together towards the same goal, which in this case is to afford patients a comfortable dying experience and families the support they need in coping with this. In an interdisciplinary team approach, there can often be role blending by members of the core team, who may take on tasks usually filled by other team members.

The hospice team is required by Medicare to meet every 14 days. During this team meeting, patient needs are discussed and planned for the next two weeks. Additionally, the team reviews the patient's medical condition to ensure that the patient still meets criteria for hospice care.

=== Team members ===
Team members include hospice medical directors, physicians, pharmacists, registered nurses, social workers, counselors, home health aides, and volunteers.

- Hospice Medical Director: The hospice medical director, a physician, often provides the most support to the clinical staff providing care to the patient and family. The medical director may also provide medical care if the primary physician is unavailable or if the patient does not have a primary care provider. The hospice medical director is also required under Medicare to recertify patients.
- Physician: Physicians involved in patient care may include the primary physician, who can provide valuable information about patient medical history, and physicians connected to the hospice team. These primarily provide support to other hospice team members, but may also treat the patient directly. The physician subspecialty of Hospice and Palliative Medicine was established in 2006, to provide expertise in the care of patients with life-limiting, advanced disease and catastrophic injury; the relief of distressing symptoms; the coordination of interdisciplinary patient and family-centered care in diverse settings; the use of specialized care systems including hospice; the management of the imminently dying patient; and legal and ethical decision making in end-of-life care.
- Registered Nurses: Registered nurses are responsible for coordinating all aspects of the patient's care and insuring symptoms (physical or otherwise) are being addressed and managed. The primary care nurse visits a minimum of twice weekly, and the content of the visit can vary greatly. When patients are experiencing few symptoms and/or are early in their diseases, the RN visit may just be a short check up. If a patient's symptoms worsen, the nurse will visit more often, make recommendations for increasing or changing the medication intervention and provide support and education regarding the disease/dying process. Many patients on hospice may require complex treatments: respiratory care, wound care or even IV therapy at home. In most cases, the hospice nurse is trained to handle these unique needs as well.
- Social Worker: Every patient is assigned a social worker who visits at the time of admission to hospice. The social worker function can vary from providing superficial support to patients and families to intensive crisis-oriented counseling. Additionally, with a terminal illness often comes more complicated financial stressors; the social worker can be instrumental in connecting the patient and family with community resources including services such as Meals on Wheels. Lastly, if a patient is unable to be cared for at home, the social worker will work to find a safer place for the patient to receive hospice care.
- Counselor: Counselors are required as part of the core team by Medicare regulations. Typically, the role is filled by a Chaplain or Spiritual Counselor, but social workers or other persons, sometimes specially trained, may also serve. While not every patient will see a Chaplain on hospice, all hospices have to be able to provide regular and consistent Chaplain services. The Chaplain is available to provide spiritually supportive counseling, life review and may connect a patient with clergy they are comfortable with. At times the hospice Chaplain will officiate at a patient's funeral.
- Home Health Aide: The home health, or hospice, aide is not a core service for a hospice patient; this means it is not required that every patient on hospice receive an aide. However, most patients do receive this service, and it is often the one most depended on by the patient and family. The hospice aide typically visits anywhere from 3–7 days a week for approximately 1–2 hours at each visit. His or her functions include providing respite to the primary caregiver and physical support to the patient, including bathing, dressing, or feeding. Many times it is the hospice aide who develops the closest relationship with the patient, due to the frequency of visits. The hospice aide is not a licensed nurse and therefore can not administer medications, treat wounds, handle IV's or similar treatments.
- Pharmacist: Pharmacists oversee the patient's drug therapy, which includes filling prescriptions, monitoring for drug interactions and adverse effects, anticipating problems, and assessing the appropriateness of drug therapies in the context of patient-oriented goals.
- Volunteers: Volunteers form a major part of hospice care in the United States and may provide a variety of physical or emotional comforts to patients and family, including providing housework, health care, spiritual counseling and companionship. Hospice volunteers also provide administrative assistance to hospices.

== Discharge from hospice ==
The majority of discharges from hospice are due to the death of the patient, although hospice treatment may not end then as care also provides for a period of bereavement counseling for the family afterward. However, there are several other scenarios when a patient may be discharged from hospice.

De-certification:

If it is determined at the time of review that a patient's prognosis may be greater than six months, the patient is de-certified (discharged) from hospice. The hospice is required by law to give advance notification to the patient, and the patient can appeal the hospice's decision to Medicare. Usually the hospice plans these discharges weeks in advance to make the transition off hospice, which can be traumatic for patients who have been preparing to die, as smooth as possible. Should the patient's condition worsen once discharged from hospice they can be readmitted to hospice.

Revocation:

Patients may be discharged by revocation if they choose to relinquish the hospice benefit. Revocation could be due to hospitalization, if the patient chooses to pursue some type of curative treatment or experiences dissatisfaction with hospice care. However, not all hospitalizations of patients require revocation; should the admitting diagnosis to the hospital be unrelated to the condition for which they are in hospice, the patient may remain on hospice while undergoing treatment for it.

Transfer of hospice:

Transfer of hospice does not involve a discharge from hospice in general, but a discharge from the current hospice provider to another one.

Discharge for cause:

Occasionally a hospice will be unable to provide care to a patient, either due to philosophical differences with the patient or due to a safety issue. Such causes could include disruptive or abusive behavior from the patient or other persons in the patient's home or refusal to cooperate with the hospice program. Patients may, after being discharged from hospice for any reason, re-enroll in hospice at a later date as necessary.

== Barriers to access ==
As indicated, hospice is frequently under-utilized and often not taken advantage of until very late in a patient's illness. The reasons for this have as much to do with financial considerations as with the psycho-social difficulty in choosing hospice. A 2009 study found that with proper case management hospice access could be liberalized without additional costs to insurers.

=== Reimbursement ===
- Physicians: There are multiple aspects as to why, financially, hospice care may be difficult to access. The first would relate to physician reluctance. As stated previously, when enrolled in hospice, the patient transitions from their primary insurance to having most of their care managed directly by the hospice. As hospices typically have a limited budget, expensive care may not be permitted by the hospice. Additionally, reimbursement for physician visits can be complicated and result in non-payment to physicians. Therefore, difficulty in authorizing expensive treatments and lack of payment for visits can be reasons for non-referral from a physician.
- Nursing Homes: A second aspect to reimbursement pertains to the nursing home. In many cases, patients who are transferred to a nursing home from a hospital will have a portion of their nursing home stay reimbursed by Medicare. In these cases, Medicare is paying for some kind of rehabilitative care. Medicare will not reimburse any room and board coverage in the nursing home for patients on hospice. Occasionally, patients who would be better served receiving hospice care will be "rehabilitated" in the nursing home so as to defray the costs of the room and board.
- Hospices: While late referral to hospice is a much more prevalent problem than early referral, some hospice providers will hesitate to admit patients to hospice (or they may de-certify them from hospice too early) due to scrutiny from Medicare for patients deemed to be on hospice too long. After a patient has been on hospice for six months, Medicare is more aggressive in auditing the hospice for inappropriate payment of services. For some hospices this is simply not worth the trouble, and patients are screened very carefully prior to admission.

=== Stigma ===
- Physicians: Medical care is traditionally focused on curing and healing the patient. For many, hospice care is not seen as the true practice of medicine. Physicians face a persistent social stigma in that hospice is mistaken as giving up on a patient, rather than committing to palliation. Additionally, and although this perception has been changing, when thinking of hospice the doctor is often focused on patients with cancer and not many of the other terminal diseases which qualify for hospice care.
- Patients: Many patients and families simply do not want to receive hospice care. The most common reason is an unwillingness to recognize when comfort rather than cure is a more realistic goal. When hospice is framed as care for when "there is nothing left to do" instead of a different kind of treatment, patients may believe that choosing hospice is the equivalent of doing nothing.

== See also ==
- Hospice
- Stephen Connor (psychologist)
