= American Academy of Hospice and Palliative Medicine =

US health organization

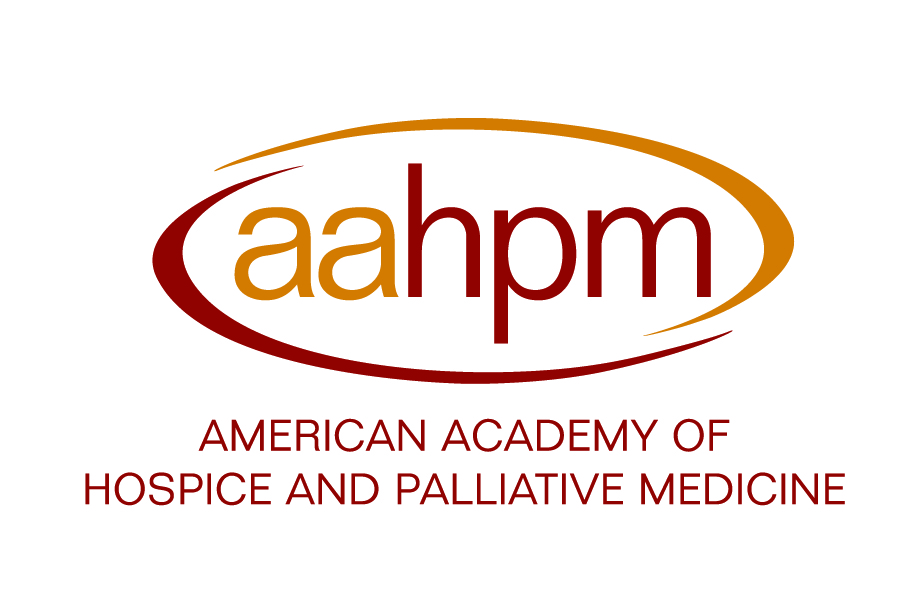
- Formation: 1988
- Type: medical association
- Headquarters: Chicago, Illinois
- Location: United States
- Official language: English
- President: Joanne Wolfe, MD MPH (2019-2020)
- Website: Official Web site

The American Academy of Hospice and Palliative Medicine (AAHPM) is a professional organization for physicians specializing in Hospice and Palliative Medicine, headquartered in Chicago, Illinois. Membership is open to all health care providers committed to improving the care of patients with serious or life-threatening illnesses. AAHPM has more than 5,200 members; 82 percent are physicians, 12 percent are nurses or other health care providers and 6 percent are residents or students.

AAHPM started a patient website to help educate the public on the importance of hospice and palliative care.

== Background ==
AAHPM was founded in 1988, with 250 charter members, as the Academy of Hospice Physicians (The academy). Josefina B. Magno, MD, president of the International Hospice Institute and Gerald Holman, MD, director of St. Anthony's Hospice and Life Enrichment Center met to discuss the formation of The academy.

== See also ==
- Hospice
- Palliative Care
- Hospice care in the United States
- Stephen Connor (psychologist)
