= Edward Shotter =

English Anglican priest (1933–2019)

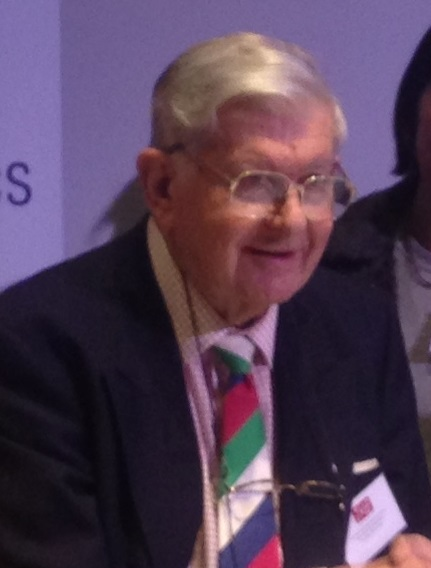
- Shotter in 2016
- Born: 29 June 1933
- Died: 3 July 2019 (aged 86)
- Education: Humberstone Foundation School; Durham University
- Occupation: Priest
- Religion: Anglican
- Ordained: 1961
- Offices held: Dean of Rochester

Edward Frank Shotter (29 June 1933 – 3 July 2019) was an Anglican priest.

Shotter was educated at Humberstone Foundation School. He studied architecture for some time at Durham University, before completing a theology degree at St David's College, Lampeter, followed by further training at St Stephen's House, Oxford. He was ordained in 1961. He began his ministry as a curate at St Peter's Plymouth, after which he was intercollegiate secretary of the Student Christian Movement. From 1966 to 1989, he was director of studies at the London Medical Group and was appointed Dean of Rochester, a post he held until retirement in 2003.

Shotter is most notable for founding the London Medical Group in the mid-1960s. This was a forum for the discussion of the ethical issues of medicine and grew out of his work with the Student Christian Movement, the Diocese of London, and the London Medical Deaneries. This group was widely exported to other UK medical schools. The group, its activities, and members presaged the Society for the Study of Medical Ethics, later the Institute of Medical Ethics, which set up the Journal of Medical Ethics. Despite being involved with the LMG and its descendant organisations for over four decades, he never lectured on any particular medical ethical topic. He only ever chaired two meetings of the LMG, once because of the last-minute cancellation of the arranged chair. Ensuring that LMG was not seen as a 'chaplaincy exercise' was important to its success; Shotter ensured its impartiality and the even-handed representation of all parties in debates.

On 9 December 2016, Shotter was presented with the Hastings Center's Henry Knowles Beecher Award for 2017.

He died on 3 July 2019, four days after his 86th birthday.

Church of England titles
Preceded by John Robert Arnold	Dean of Rochester; 1989–2003	Succeeded by Adrian Newman
