= Sobell House Hospice =

Hospice in Oxfordshire, England

- Oxford University Hospitals NHS Trust

Geography
- Location: Churchill Hospital, Oxford, Oxfordshire, England

Organisation
- Care system: NHS and Charity
- Type: Adult Palliative Care and Teaching

Services
- Beds: 20 Inpatient and Day Centre

History
- Opened: 1976

Links
- Website: http://www.sobellhouse.org/
- Lists: Hospitals in England

Sobell House Hospice is an Oxford-based hospice serving the residents of Oxfordshire, England affected by life-limiting illness.

== History ==
In 1968 a report published established a clear need for a palliative care service in Oxfordshire. In 1972 this came to the attention of Sir Michael Sobell, then president of the National Society for Cancer Relief (NSCR).

Sir Michael committed to supporting the building of a hospice. In 1974 the charity Friends of Sir Michael Sobell House was established (now the Sobell House Hospice Charity), and together with funding from the NHS, and from Sir Michael and the NSCR, sufficient was raised to build a specialist palliative care unit, which opened to patients in 1976.

The charity subsequently built a new twenty bed hospice which was opened in 2003.

Sir Michael Sobell House Hospice continues to be jointly funded by the NHS and charitable donations.

== Activities ==
The hospice is a comprehensive specialist palliative care service, with an inpatient unit and day service available. It offers specialist palliative care to people with terminal illnesses, including physical, psychological, social and spiritual care, together with support for their families and those close to them.

It is also a World Health Organization Collaborating Centre for Palliative Care.

== Sobell House Hospice Charity ==
Sobell House Hospice Charity has operated since 1974 when Dr. Alstair Laing established the committee the Friends of Sir Michael Sobell House. The committee swiftly developed to become the Friends of Sobell House with Sir Michael Sobell as patron and the Duchess of Marlborough as president. By 1975 the membership of the Friends of Sobell House totalled 60 and Lord Trend (Rector of Lincoln College and formerly Secretary of the Cabinet) was Chairman. Later in 1975 the Charity Commission accorded the Friends of Sobell House charity status.

Thanks to generous donations from Sir Michael Sobell, the NSCR (currently Macmillan Cancer Support) and the people of Oxfordshire, the Friends of Sobell House had raised £300,000.00 by 1979 allowing the first hospice to be built and handed over to the public. The current hospice is very different from the building handed over in 1979, the light airy space was built following a £3,000,000.00 fundraising drive by the Charity. Funds were raised with donations from the people and business of Oxfordshire, and The Sobell Foundation.

The Charity current operates as Sobell House Hospice Charity Ltd and although it has been through many constitutional changes its aims remain the same as the original friends:

1. To ensure that links to the community are established and nurtured to support patients and encourage volunteering.
2. To raise funds to benefit Sobell House.
3. To engage with other bodies for the benefit of Sobell House.

Today the Charity and NHS work together to ensure that good quality specialist palliative care and end of life support is provided by the Hospice. Sobell House Hospice is an NHS hospice, with additional funds provided by the Charity. The funds provided by the Charity are used for the day-to-day running of the hospice, to help the hospice staff focus on developing care, and to allow the hospice to reach out and provide care in the community and other hospitals.

The Charity is based in an office within the current hospice building, the day-to-day running of the Charity is responsibility of Amelia Foster the Chief Executive. The Charity's trustees take overall responsibility for the Charity and may be seen at fundraising events.

=== Current Fundraising ===
The Charity's fundraising team are based in the Charity's head office and engage with corporate sponsors and individuals, as well as running numerous events. Individuals raise funds for the hospice by taking part in a range of activities from coffee mornings to marathon running to sky diving. The Charity and the hospice also engage a large volunteer work force from the local community who donate their time to reduce the overheads of running the Charity. The Charity also manages and gains funds from numerous legacies.

As well as raising funds from individuals the Charity has strong relationships with local businesses. Companies are encouraged to engage with the Charity in a variety of ways ranging from donations through to donations of time. To help the Charity celebrate its fortieth birthday the 40 Club was formed which is a group of 40 companies each pledging to raise £10,000.00 over the next four years to support the work of the hospice.

The main activities of the fundraising team is organising and hosting events. The Charity's annual headline event is the Moonlight Stroll where walkers are sponsored to complete a late night walk around the beautiful Oxford city centre. The stroll start in 2006 and goes from strength to strength each year the target of the 2015 was to raise £100,000.00 in just one evening. The Charity holds numerous other events throughout the year culminating with, the Christmas Gift Fair and the Lights of Love.

=== Sobell House Charity Shops ===
The main public face of the Charity is its eleven shops located across Oxfordshire. The shops sell a variety of donated items from large pieces of furniture through to small ornaments and clothing. The trading company also sells a mix of new goods including branded calendars, Christmas cards and diaries. The shops are run from the Trading Office a separate administrative unit from the Charity office. All the profits from the sale of donated and new goods are donated to the Charity each year. Currently the Charity's shops raise approximately the same amount as the fundraising team.
