= British Journal of Sexual Medicine =

- Discipline: Sexology
- Language: English

Publication details
- History: 1973–present

Standard abbreviations
- ISO 4: Br. J. Sex. Med.

Indexing
- ISSN: 0301-5572

Links
- Journal homepage

The British Journal of Sexual Medicine (abbreviated Br J Sex Med or BJSM) is a medical periodical, which was first published in 1973.

The first issue declared an intent "to provide authoritative and scientific knowledge on sexual problems and medical problems that have sexual implications to them. The journal will explore the purely clinical field as well as areas of related knowledge that can be brought to bear upon medical practice from the world of psychology, sociology and other behavioural sciences… we will not attempt to be tied to any one particular point of view with relation to human sexuality".

The remit of the journal has broadened to cover developments in HRT, contraception, oncology and HIV.

The BJSM is published by Hayward Medical Communications.
