= Florence Wald =

American nurse (1917–2008)

- Born: Florence Sophie Schorske; April 19, 1917; New York City
- Died: November 8, 2008 (aged 91); Branford, Connecticut
- Education: Mount Holyoke College; Yale School of Nursing
- Occupation: Dean of the Yale School of Nursing
- Known for: Pioneering the American hospice movement

Florence Wald (April 19, 1917 – November 8, 2008) was an American nurse, former Dean of Yale School of Nursing, and largely credited as "the mother of the American hospice movement". She led the founding of Connecticut Hospice, the first hospice program in the United States. Late in life, Wald became interested in the provision of hospice care within prisons. In 1998, Wald was inducted into the National Women's Hall of Fame.

== Biography ==
=== Early life ===
Wald was born as Florence Sophie Schorske in New York City on April 19, 1917. Due to a chronic respiratory ailment, she spent several months as a child in a hospital. This hospitalization experience led her to pursue a career in nursing. Wald received a B.A. from Mount Holyoke College in 1938 and an M.N. from Yale School of Nursing in 1941.

After World War II, she became a staff nurse with the Visiting Nurse Service of New York, a research assistant at the Columbia University College of Physicians and Surgeons, and was an instructor at the Rutgers University school of nursing. She received a second master's degree from Yale University in mental health nursing in 1956 and became an instructor at the school's nursing program. She became Dean of Yale School of Nursing in 1959, after being named to the position on an acting basis the previous year. A short time later, she reconnected with Henry Wald, whom she met initially while she was conducting a study with the United States Army Signal Corps. The couple married later that year.

=== Hospice movement ===
Wald's interest in the care of the terminally ill was piqued in 1963 when she attended a lecture at Yale University presented by the English physician Cicely Saunders, an innovator in the field who later created St. Christopher's Hospice, the world's first purpose-built hospice. Dr. Saunders spoke that day about her methods of using palliative care for terminally ill cancer patients, with the intention of allowing those in the latest stages of their disease to focus on their personal relationships and prepare themselves for death. An "indelible impression" was made by Dr. Saunders, with Wald noting that "until then I had thought nurses were the only people troubled by how a terminal illness was treated".

Following the Saunders lecture, Wald worked to update the nursing school's curriculum to encourage students to focus on the patient and their family, and to keep all of them involved in the patient's care. She left her position as dean in 1966, with plans to develop a hospice in the United States similar to the one Saunders was developing in England. Though she stepped down as dean, Wald retained a faculty position as a research associate and as a member of the clinical nursing faculty, and was promoted to a full professor there in 1980. Despite the financial impact on their family, she continued her goal of building a program and visited England twice with her husband to visit Dr. Saunders. St. Christopher's Hospice opened in 1967; Wald worked there for a month in 1969.

Her husband left his engineering firm and enrolled at Columbia University in 1971 with a major in hospital planning. It was his master's degree thesis that provided the framework for the Connecticut Hospice. Wald conducted a two-year research program studying how terminally ill patients fared at home or in a healthcare facility, and tracked how patients and their families felt throughout the process. After returning to the United States, she organized a team of doctors, clergy and nurses to investigate the needs of dying patients. In 1974, she, along with two pediatricians and a Yale medical center chaplain, founded the first hospice in the United States at the Connecticut Hospice, located in Branford, Connecticut. Initially the program provided home care, and had its first inpatient location in 1980, a 44-bed facility in Branford. Disagreements had been brewing within the board about her vision for the hospice program, and she was forced to resign shortly after its opening.

Other hospice programs were created building on Wald's innovation at Branford. By 1980, Medicaid began to pay for care provided at a hospice, which led to a sharp rise in such facilities. By the time of her death in 2008, there were more than 3,000 hospice programs in the United States, serving some 900,000 patients annually.

=== Later life ===
Well into her 80s, Wald traveled to prisons in Connecticut performing a research project on behalf of the National Prison Hospice Association, an organization founded in 1991 and based in Boulder, Colorado. Wald served on the organization's board of directors. Wald worked on considering ways to make hospice care available to those incarcerated in the prison system, including training inmates to become hospice volunteers for dying inmates or arranging for outside hospice care for inmates granted compassionate leave given their medical condition. Wald noted that training prisoners to provide such care would assist the terminally ill and help rehabilitate the volunteers at almost no cost to the prisons. She was awarded an honorary doctorate in 1996 from Yale University, Wald was introduced as "the mother of the American hospice movement".

Speaking of her interest in prison hospice care in 1998, Wald said, "People on the outside don’t understand this world at all. Most people in prison have had a rough time in life and haven’t had any kind of education in how to take care of their health. There is the shame factor, the feeling that dying in prison is the ultimate failure."

Florence Wald died at age 91 on November 8, 2008, at her home in Branford, Connecticut.

== See also ==
- List of Living Legends of the American Academy of Nursing

== Sources ==
- Friedrich, M.J. (1999) "Hospice Care in the United States: A Conversation With Florence S. Wald". JAMA. 281: 1683–1685.
- History and contributions of Yale School of Nursing
- Connecticut Women's Hall of Fame
- The Hospice Experiment
- Florence and Henry Wald Papers (MS 1659). Manuscripts and Archives, Yale University Library.
