= Hospice =

Type of health care for the terminally ill

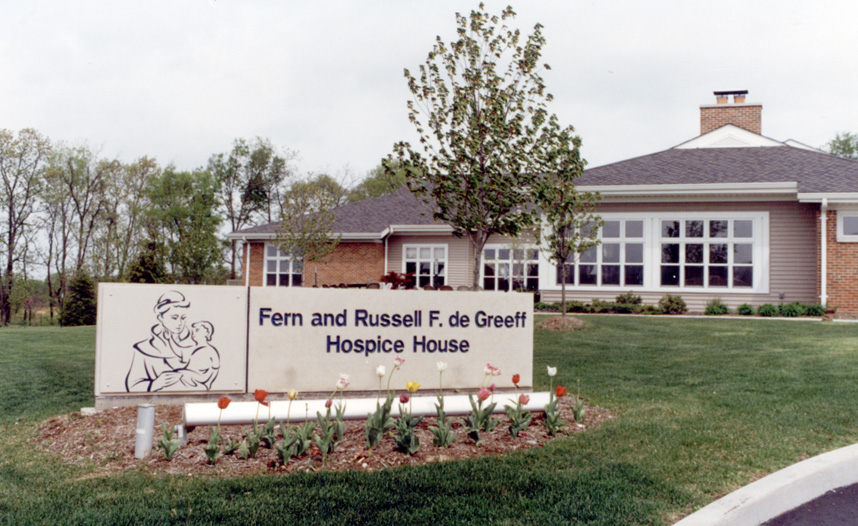
A Hospice House in Missouri

Hospice care is a type of health care that focuses on the palliation (providing relief of pain) of a terminally ill patient's pain and symptoms and attending to their emotional and spiritual needs at the end of life. Hospice care prioritizes comfort and quality of life by reducing pain and suffering. Hospice care provides an alternative to therapies focused on life-prolonging measures that may be arduous, likely to cause more symptoms, or are not aligned with a person's goals.

Hospice care in the United States is largely defined by the practices of the Medicare system and other health insurance providers, which cover inpatient or at-home hospice care for patients with terminal diseases who are estimated to live six months or less. Hospice care under the Medicare Hospice Benefit requires documentation from two physicians estimating a person has less than six months to live if the disease follows its usual course. Hospice benefits include access to a multidisciplinary treatment team specialized in end-of-life care and can be accessed in the home, long-term care facility or the hospital.

Outside the United States, the term tends to be primarily associated with the particular buildings or institutions that specialize in such care. Such institutions may similarly provide care mostly in an end-of-life setting, but they may also be available for patients with other palliative care needs. Hospice care includes assistance for patients' families to help them cope with what is happening and provide care and support to keep the patient at home.

The English word hospice is a borrowing from French. In France however, the word hospice refers more generally to an institution where sick and destitute people are cared for, and does not necessarily have a palliative connotation.

== Philosophy ==
The goal of hospice care is to prioritize comfort, quality of life and individual wishes. How comfort is defined is up to each individual or, if the patient is incapacitated, the patient's family. This can include addressing physical, emotional, spiritual and/or social needs. In hospice care, patient-directed goals are integral and interwoven throughout the care. Hospices typically do not perform treatments that are meant to diagnose or cure an illness but also do not include treatments that hasten death. Instead, hospices focus on palliative care to relieve pain and symptoms.

This philosophy affects how hospice staff treat people and their families. Compared to general healthcare providers, hospice professionals take a different approach to talking to people and their families. They are more likely to make predictions or express uncertainty around future events (e.g., "He might die this week" or "I think she might live longer") than to issue orders or prescribe actions (e.g., "She needs a nurse" or "He can't go home").

== History overview ==
=== Early development ===
The word hospice derives from Latin hospitum, meaning hospitality or place of rest and protection for the ill and weary. Historians believe the first hospices originated in Malta around 1065, dedicated to caring for the ill and dying en route to and from the Holy Land. The rise of the European Crusading movement in the 1090s placed the incurably ill into places dedicated to treatment. In the early 14th century, the order of the Knights Hospitaller of St. John of Jerusalem opened the first hospice in Rhodes. Hospices flourished in the Middle Ages, but languished as religious orders became dispersed. They were revived in the 17th century in France by the Daughters of Charity of Saint Vincent de Paul. France continued to see development in the hospice field; the hospice of L'Association des Dames du Calvaire, founded by Jeanne Garnier, opened in 1843. Six other hospices followed before 1900.

Meanwhile, hospices developed in other areas. In the United Kingdom attention was drawn to the needs of the terminally ill in the middle of the 19th century, with Lancet and the British Medical Journal publishing articles pointing to the need of the impoverished terminally ill for good care and sanitary conditions. Steps were taken to remedy inadequate facilities with the opening of the Friedenheim in London, which by 1892 offered 35 beds to patients dying of tuberculosis. Four more hospices were established in London by 1905, including the Hostel of God on Clapham Common founded in 1891 by Clara Maria Hole, Mother Superior of Sisterhood of St James' (Anglican) and taken over in 1896 by the Society of Saint Margaret of East Grinstead. Australia, too, saw active hospice development, with notable hospices including the Home for Incurables in Adelaide (1879), the Home of Peace (1902) and the Anglican House of Peace for the Dying in Sydney (1907). In 1899 New York City, the Servants for Relief of Incurable Cancer opened St. Rose's Hospice, which soon expanded to six locations in other cities.

The more influential early developers of hospice included the Irish Religious Sisters of Charity, who opened Our Lady's Hospice in Harold's Cross, Dublin, Ireland, in 1879. It served as many as 20,000 people—primarily with tuberculosis and cancer—dying there between 1845 and 1945. The Sisters of Charity expanded internationally, opening the Sacred Heart Hospice for the Dying in Sydney in 1890, with hospices in Melbourne and New South Wales following in the 1930s. In 1905, they opened St Joseph's Hospice in London.

=== Hospice movement ===
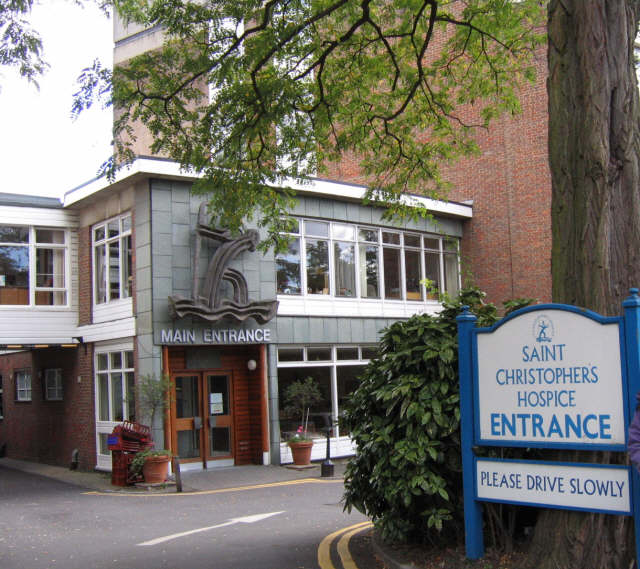
St Christopher's Hospice in 2005

In Western society, the concept of hospice began evolving in Europe in the 11th century. In Roman Catholic tradition, hospices were places of hospitality for the sick, wounded, or dying, as well as for travelers and pilgrims. The modern hospice concept includes palliative care for the incurably ill in institutions as hospitals and nursing homes, along with at-home care. The first modern hospice care was created by Dame Cicely Saunders in 1967. Saunders was a British registered nurse whose chronic health problems forced her to pursue a career in medical social work. The relationship she developed with a dying Polish refugee helped solidify her ideas that terminally ill patients needed compassionate care to help address their fears and concerns as well as palliative comfort for physical symptoms. After the refugee's death, Saunders began volunteering at St Luke's Home for the Dying Poor, where a physician told her that she could best influence the treatment of the terminally ill as a physician. Saunders entered medical school while continuing her volunteer work at St. Joseph's. When she completed her degree in 1957, she took a position there.

Saunders emphasized focusing on the patient rather than the disease and introduced the notion of 'total pain', which included psychological and spiritual as well as physical discomfort. She experimented with opioids for controlling physical pain. She also considered the needs of the patient's family. She developed many foundational principles of modern hospice care at St Joseph's.

She disseminated her philosophy internationally in a series of tours of the United States that began in 1963. In 1967, Saunders opened St Christopher's Hospice. Florence Wald, the dean of Yale School of Nursing, who had heard Saunders speak in America, spent a month working with Saunders there in 1969 before bringing the principles of modern hospice care back to the United States, establishing Hospice, Inc. in 1971. Another early hospice program in the United States, Alive Hospice, was founded in Nashville, Tennessee, on November 14, 1975. By 1977 the National Hospice Organization had been formed, and by 1979, a president, Ann G. Blues, had been elected and principles of hospice care had been addressed. At about the same time that Saunders was disseminating her theories and developing her hospice, in 1965, Swiss psychiatrist Elisabeth Kübler-Ross began to consider social responses to terminal illness, which she found inadequate at the Chicago hospital where her American physician husband was employed. Her 1969 best-seller, On Death and Dying, influenced the medical profession's response to the terminally ill. Dr. Balfour Mount introduced the concept of palliative care to Canada in the early 1970s and established the first hospice program at the Royal Victoria Hospital in Montreal, laying the foundation for modern palliative care practices. Saunders and other thanatology pioneers helped to focus attention on the types of care available to them.

In 1984, Josefina Magno, who had been instrumental in forming the American Academy of Hospice and Palliative Medicine and sat as first executive director of the US National Hospice Organization, founded the International Hospice Institute, which in 1996 became the International Hospice Institute and College and later the International Association for Hospice and Palliative Care (IAHPC). The IAHPC follows the philosophy that each country should develop a palliative care model based on its own resources and conditions. IAHPC founding member Derek Doyle told the British Medical Journal in 2003 that Magno had seen "more than 8000 hospice and palliative services established in more than 100 countries." Standards for Palliative and Hospice Care have been developed in countries including Australia, Canada, Hungary, Italy, Japan, Moldova, Norway, Poland, Romania, Spain, Switzerland, the United Kingdom and the United States.

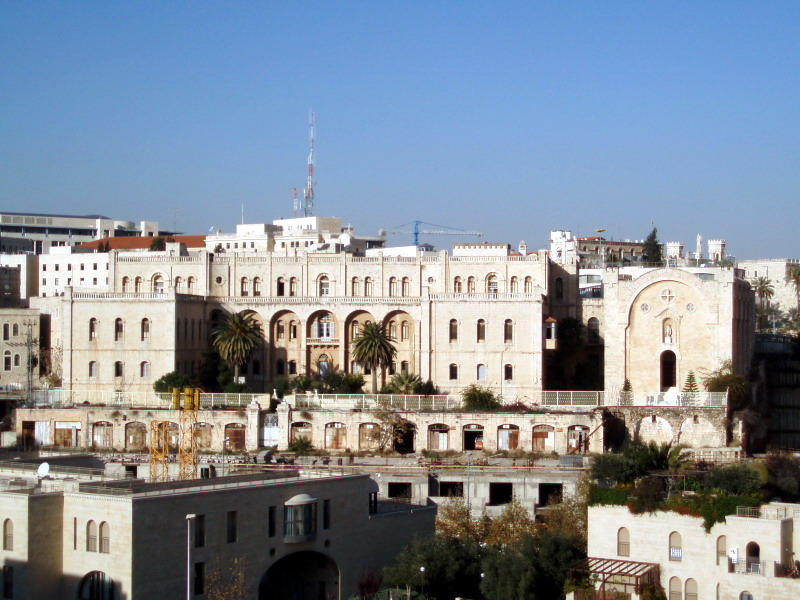
Hospice Saint Vincent de Paul, Jerusalem

In 2006, the United States–based National Hospice and Palliative Care Organization (NHPCO) and the United Kingdom's Help the Hospices jointly commissioned an independent, international study of worldwide palliative care practices. Their survey found that 15% of the world's countries offered widespread palliative care services with integration into major health care institutions, while an additional 35% offered some form of palliative care services, in some cases localized or limited. As of 2009, an estimated 10,000 programs internationally provided palliative care, although the term hospice is not always employed to describe such services.

In hospice care, the main guardians are the family care giver(s) and a hospice nurse/team who make periodic visits. Hospice can be administered in a nursing home, hospice building, or sometimes a hospital; however, it is most commonly practiced in the home. Hospice care targets the terminally ill who are expected to die within six months.

=== Popular media ===
Hospice was the subject of the Netflix 2018 Academy Award–nominated short documentary End Game, about terminally ill patients in a San Francisco hospital and Zen Hospice Project, featuring the work of palliative care physician BJ Miller and other palliative care clinicians. The film was executive produced by hospice and palliative care activist Shoshana R. Ungerleider.

In 2016, an open letter to the singer David Bowie written by a palliative care doctor, Professor Mark Taubert, talked about the importance of good palliative care and hospice provision, especially being able to express wishes about the last months of life, and good education about end of life care generally. The letter went viral after David Bowie's son Duncan Jones shared it. The letter was subsequently read out by the actor Benedict Cumberbatch and the singer Jarvis Cocker at public events.

== National variations ==
Hospice faced resistance from cultural and professional taboos against open communication about death among healthcare providers and the wider population, discomfort with unfamiliar medical techniques and perceived professional callousness towards the terminally ill. Nevertheless, the movement has spread throughout the world.

=== Africa ===
A hospice opened in 1980 in Harare (Salisbury), Zimbabwe, the first in Sub-Saharan Africa. In spite of skepticism in the medical community, the hospice movement spread, and in 1987 the Hospice Palliative Care Association of South Africa formed. In 1990, Nairobi Hospice opened in Nairobi, Kenya. As of 2006, Kenya, South Africa and Uganda were among 35 countries offering widespread, well-integrated palliative care. Programs adopted the United Kingdom model, but emphasise home-based assistance.

Following the foundation of hospice in Kenya in the early 1990s, palliative care spread throughout the country. Representatives of Nairobi Hospice sit on the committee to develop a Health Sector Strategic Plan for the Ministry of Health and work with the Ministry of Health to help develop palliative care guidelines for cervical cancer. The Government of Kenya supported hospice by donating land to Nairobi Hospice and providing funding to several of its nurses.

In South Africa, hospice services are widespread, focusing on diverse communities (including orphans and homeless) and offered in diverse settings (including in-patient, day care and home care). Over half of hospice patients in South Africa in the 2003–2004 year were diagnosed with AIDS, with the majority of the remaining diagnosed with cancer. Palliative care is supported by the Hospice Palliative Care Association of South Africa and by national programmes partly funded by the President's Emergency Plan for AIDS Relief.

Hospice Africa Uganda (HAU), founded by Anne Merriman, began offering services in 1993 in a two-bedroom house loaned for the purpose by Nsambya Hospital. HAU has since expanded to a base of operations at Makindye, Kampala, with hospice services offered at roadside clinics by Mobile Hospice Mbarara since January 1998. That same year the Little Hospice Hoima opened in June. Hospice care in Uganda is supported by community volunteers and professionals, as Makerere University offers a distance diploma in palliative care. The government of Uganda published a strategic plan for palliative care that permits nurses and clinical officers from HAU to prescribe morphine.

=== North America ===
==== Canada ====
Canadian physician Balfour Mount, who first coined the term "palliative care", was a pioneer in medical research and in the Canadian hospice movement, which focused primarily on palliative care in a hospital setting. After meeting Kübler-Ross, Mount studied the experiences of the terminally ill at Royal Victoria Hospital, Montreal; the "abysmal inadequacy", as he termed it, that he found prompted him to spend a week with Cicely Saunders at St. Christopher's. Mount decided to adapt Saunders' model for Canada. Given differences in medical funding, he determined that a hospital-based approach would be more affordable, creating a specialized ward at Royal Victoria in January 1975. Canada's official languages include English and French, leading Mount to propose the term "palliative care ward", as the word hospice was already used in France to refer to nursing homes. Hundreds of palliative care programs then followed throughout Canada through the 1970s and 1980s.

However, as of 2004, according to the Canadian Hospice Palliative Care Association (CHPCA), hospice palliative care was only available to 5–15% of Canadians, with government funding declining. At that time, Canadians were increasingly expressing a desire to die at home, but only two of Canada's ten provinces were provided medication cost coverage for home care. Only four of ten identified palliative care as a core health service. At that time, palliative care was not widely taught at nursing schools or universally certified at medical colleges; only 175 specialized palliative care physicians served all of Canada.

==== United States ====
Hospice in the United States has grown from a volunteer-led movement to improve care for people dying alone, isolated, or in hospitals, to a significant part of the health care system. In 2010, an estimated 1.581 million patients received hospice services. Hospice is the only Medicare benefit that includes pharmaceuticals, medical equipment, twenty-four-hour/seven-day-a-week access to care, and support for loved ones following a death. Hospice care is covered by Medicaid and most private insurance plans. Most hospice care is delivered at home. Hospice care is available to people in home-like hospice residences, nursing homes, assisted living facilities, veterans' facilities, hospitals and prisons.

Florence Wald, Dean of the Yale School of Nursing, founded one of the first hospices in the United States in New Haven, Connecticut, in 1974. The first hospital-based palliative care consultation service developed in the US was the Wayne State University School of Medicine in 1985 at Detroit Receiving Hospital. The first US-based palliative medicine and hospice service program was started in 1987 by Declan Walsh at the Cleveland Clinic Cancer Center in Cleveland, Ohio. The program evolved into The Harry R. Horvitz Center for Palliative Medicine, which was designated as a World Health Organization international demonstration project and accredited by the European Society of Medical Oncology as an Integrated Center of Oncology and Palliative Care. Other programs followed; some notable ones are: the Palliative Care Program at the Medical College of Wisconsin (1993); Pain and Palliative Care Service, Memorial Sloan-Kettering Cancer Center (1996); and The Lilian and Benjamin Hertzberg Palliative Care Institute, Mount Sinai School of Medicine (1997).

In 1982, Congress initiated the creation of the Medicare Hospice Benefit, which became permanent in 1986. In 1993, President Clinton installed hospice as a guaranteed benefit and an accepted component of health care provisions. As of 2017, 1.49 million Medicare beneficiaries were enrolled in hospice care for one day or more, which is a 4.5% increase from the previous year. From 2014 to 2019, Asian- and Hispanic-identifying beneficiaries of hospice care increased by 32% and 21% respectively.

=== UK and Ireland ===
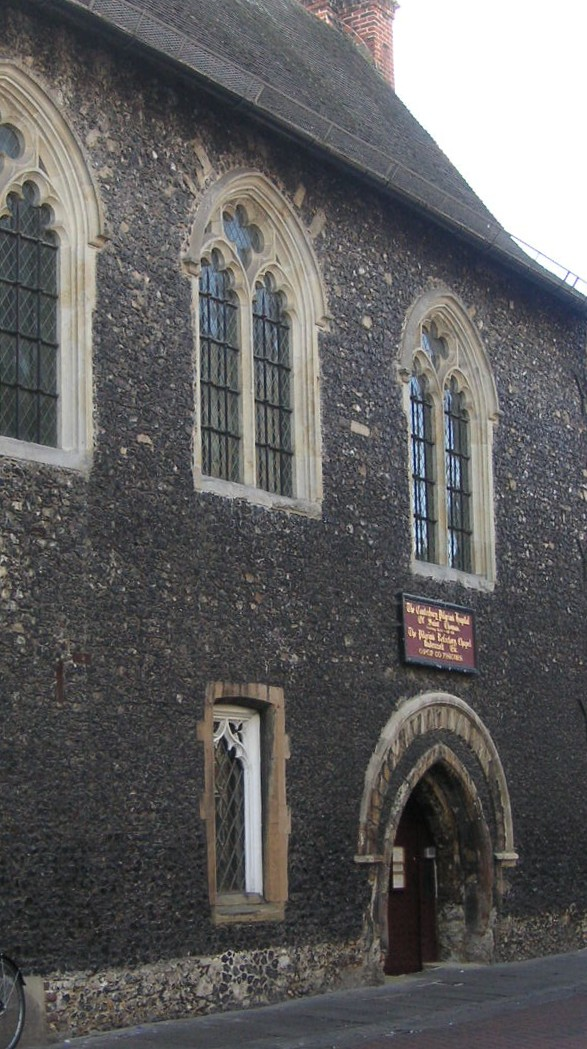
St Thomas Hospice, Canterbury

In 1879, the Religious Sisters of Charity opened Our Lady's Hospice in Dublin, Ireland.The first hospice to open in Great Britain was the Trinity Hospice in Clapham south London in 1891, on the initiative of the Hoare banking family. More than half a century later, a hospice movement developed after Dame Cicely Saunders opened St Christopher's Hospice in 1967, widely considered the first modern hospice. According to the UK's Help the Hospices, in 2011 UK hospice services consisted of 220 inpatient units for adults with 3,175 beds, 42 inpatient units for children with 334 beds, 288 home care services, 127 hospice at-home services, 272 day care services, and 343 hospital support services. These services together helped over 250,000 patients in 2003 and 2004. Funding varies from 100% funding by the National Health Service to almost 100% funding by charities, but the service is always free to patients. The UK's palliative care has been ranked as the best in the world "due to comprehensive national policies, the extensive integration of palliative care into the National Health Service, a strong hospice movement, and deep community engagement on the issue."

As of 2006, about 4% of all deaths in England and Wales occurred in a hospice setting (about 20,000 patients); a further number of patients spent time in a hospice, or were helped by hospice-based support services, but died elsewhere.

Hospices also provide volunteering opportunities for over 100,000 people in the UK, whose economic value to the hospice movement has been estimated at over £112 million.

=== Egypt ===
According to the Global Atlas of Palliative Care at the End of Life, 78% of adults and 98% of children in need of palliative care at the end of life live in low and middle-income countries. Nevertheless, hospice and palliative care provision in Egypt is limited and sparsely available relative to the size of the population. Some of the obstacles to the development of these services have included the lack of public awareness, restricted availability of opioids, and the absence of a national hospice and palliative care development plan. Key efforts made in the past 10 years have been initiated by individuals allowing for the emergence of the first non-governmental organisation providing primarily home-based hospice services in 2010, the opening of one palliative medicine unit at Cairo University in 2008 and an inpatient palliative care unit in Alexandria.

Models of both home-based care and stand-alone hospices exist globally, but with the cultural and societal preferences of patients and their families to die at home in Egypt there is an inclination to focus on the development of home-based hospice and palliative care services.

=== Israel ===
The first hospice unit in Israel opened in 1983. More than two decades later, a 2016 study found that 46% of the general Israeli public had never heard of it, despite the 70% of physicians who reported that they had the skill to treat patients according to palliative principles.

=== Other nations ===
Hospice care in Australia predated the opening of St Christophers in London by 79 years. The Irish Sisters of Charity opened hospices in Sydney (1889) and in Melbourne (1938). The first hospice in New Zealand opened in 1979. Hospice care entered Poland in the mid-1970s. Japan opened its first hospice in 1981, officially hosting 160 by July 2006. India's first hospice, Shanti Avedna Ashram, opened in Bombay in 1986. The first hospice in the Nordics opened in Tampere, Finland in 1988. The first modern free-standing hospice in China opened in Shanghai in 1988. The first hospice unit in Taiwan, where the term for hospice translates as "peaceful care", opened in 1990. The first free-standing hospice in Hong Kong, where the term for hospice translates as "well-ending service", opened in 1992.

The International Hospice Institute was founded in 1984.

==== World Hospice and Palliative Care Day ====
In 2006, the first World Hospice and Palliative Care Day was organised by the Worldwide Palliative Care Alliance, a network of hospice and palliative care national and regional organisations that support the development of hospice and palliative care worldwide. The event takes place on the second Saturday of October every year.

=== Hospice home health ===
Nurses that work in hospice in the home healthcare setting aim to relieve pain and holistically support their patient and the patient's family. Patients can receive hospice care when they have less than six months to live or would like to shift the focus of care from curative to comfort care. The goal of hospice care is to meet the needs of both the patient and family, knowing that a home death is not always the best outcome. Medicare covers all costs of hospice treatment.

The hospice home health nurse must be skilled in both physical care and psychosocial care. Most nurses will work with a team that includes a physician, social worker and possibly a spiritual care counselor. Some of the nurse's duties will include reassuring family members, and ensuring adequate pain control. The nurse will need to explain to the patient and family that a pain-free death is possible, and scheduled opioid pain medications are appropriate in this case. The nurse will need to work closely with the medical provider to ensure that dosing is appropriate, and in the case of tolerance, the dose is raised. The nurse should be aware of cultural differences and needs and should aim to meet them. The nurse will also support the family after death and connect the family to bereavement services.

== See also ==
- Ann Robertson
- Children's hospice
- Deathbed phenomena
- Death midwife
- Hospice chaplain
- Life support
- Pain management
- Robert Twycross
- Sanatorium
- Worldwide Hospice and Palliative Care Alliance
