= St Christopher's Hospice =

Hospice in London Borough of Bromley, England

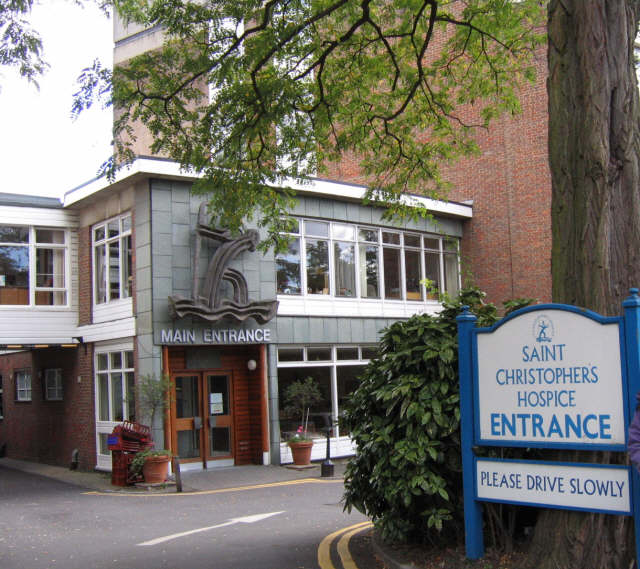
- St Christopher's Hospice in 2005; Photo by Stephen Craven

Geography
- Location: London Borough of Bromley, England
- Coordinates: 51.421608°N 0.058717°W

Organisation
- Type: Specialist

Services
- Speciality: End-of-life care (Hospice)

History
- Founded: 1967

Links
- Website: www.stchristophers.org.uk
- Lists: Hospitals in England

St. Christopher's Hospice is a hospice in south London, England, established in 1967 by Cicely Saunders, whose work is considered the basis of modern hospice philosophy.

== Legacy ==
Among the first staff at St. Christopher's were nurse Barbara McNulty and GP Mary Baines, who began the first hospice home care project, and Florence Wald, who took Saunders' philosophies back to the United States to become the founder of the hospice movement in the United States.

In 1971 Robert Twycross was appointed as a Clinical Research Fellow by Saunders. During his tenure there, his studies on the effectiveness of morphine, diamorphine and methadone helped standardize and simplify the management of cancer pain.

The hospice houses an exhibition of sculptures by the Polish artist Witold Gracjan Kawalec.
