= Cicely Saunders =

English nurse, social worker, physician and writer (1918–2005)

Dame Cicely Saunders OM DBE FRCS FRCP FRCN
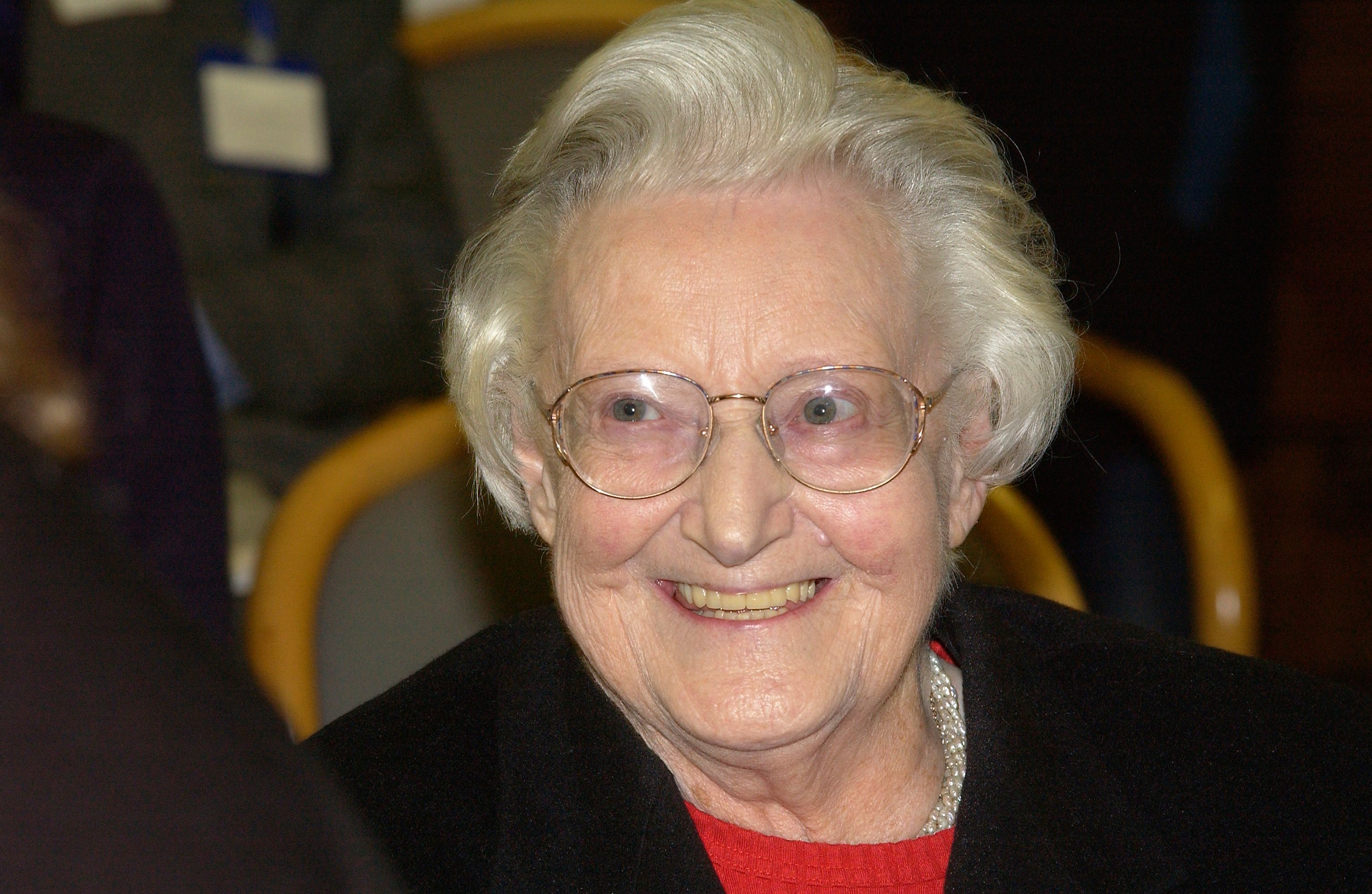
- Saunders in 2002
- Born: Cicely Mary Strode Saunders; 22 June 1918; Barnet, Hertfordshire, England
- Died: 14 July 2005 (aged 87); Bromley, London, England
- Education: St Thomas's Hospital Medical School; St Anne's College, Oxford
- Occupations: Nurse; social worker; physician; writer
- Known for: Hospice care movement, Founder of St Christophers Hospice
- Spouse: Marian Bohusz-Szyszko (m. 1980; died 1995)

Dame Cicely Mary Strode Saunders (22 June 1918 – 14 July 2005) was an English nurse, social worker, physician and writer. She is noted for her work in terminal care research and her role in the birth of the hospice movement, emphasising the importance of palliative care in modern medicine, and opposing the legalisation of voluntary euthanasia.

== Early life and education ==
Saunders was born in Barnet, Hertfordshire, to Philip Gordon Saunders, a chartered surveyor and landowner, and to Mary Christian Knight. She had two younger brothers, John Frederick Stacey Saunders and Christopher Gordon Strode Saunders.

After attending Roedean School (1932–37), Saunders began studying politics, philosophy, and economics at St Anne's College, Oxford in 1938. During the war, she decided to become a nurse and trained at Nightingale School of Nursing based at St Thomas's Hospital from 1940 to 1944. Returning to St Anne's College after a back injury in 1944, she took a BA in 1945, qualifying as a medical social worker in 1947 and eventually trained as a doctor at St Thomas's Hospital Medical School (now merged to form King's College London GKT School of Medical Education) and qualified MBBS in 1957.

== Relationships ==
In 1948, Saunders fell in love with a patient, Ela Majer "David" Tasma, a Polish-Jewish refugee who, having escaped from the Warsaw Ghetto, worked as a waiter; he was dying of cancer. He bequeathed her £500 (equivalent to £16,000 in 2025) to be "a window in your home". This donation, which helped germinate the idea that would become St Christopher's Hospice, Sydenham, London, is memorialized with a plain sheet of glass at the hospice's entrance.

While training for social work, she experienced a spiritual awakening and realized that she very much believed in a higher power, a revelation that underpinned her work. In the late 1940s, Saunders began working part-time at St Luke's Home for the Dying Poor in Bayswater, and it was partly this which, in 1951, led her to begin studying to become a physician.

== Hospice ==
A year later, Saunders began working at St Joseph's Hospice, a Catholic establishment in Hackney, East London, where she would remain for seven years, researching pain control. There she met a second Pole, Antoni Michniewicz, a patient with whom she fell in love. His death, in 1960, coincided with the death of Saunders's father in 1961, and another friend, and put her into what she later called a state of "pathological grieving". But she had already decided to set up her own hospice, serving cancer patients, and said that Michniewicz's death had shown her that "as the body becomes weaker, so the spirit becomes stronger".

Saunders said that after 11 years of thinking about the project, she had drawn up a comprehensive plan and sought finance after reading Psalm 37: "Commit thy way unto the Lord; trust also in him; and he shall bring it to pass." She succeeded in engaging the support of Albertine Winner, the deputy chief medical officer at the Ministry of Health at the time. Later, as Dame Albertine Winner, she served as chair of St Christopher's. In 1965, Saunders was appointed Officer of the Order of the British Empire.

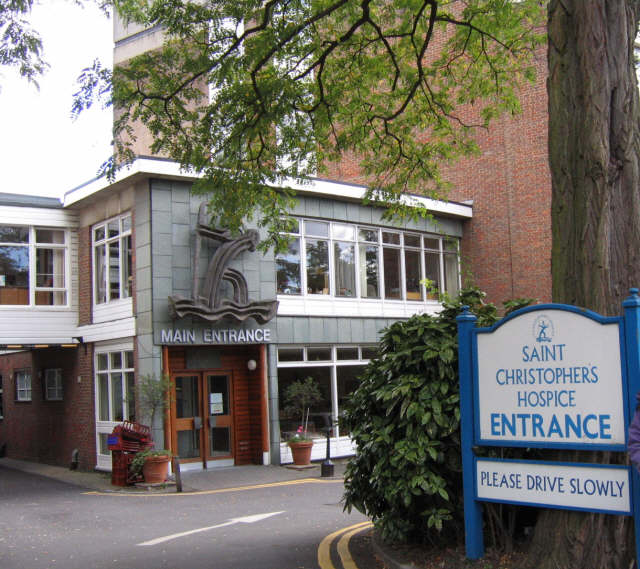
St Christopher's Hospice, Sydenham, London

In 1967, St Christopher's Hospice, the world's first purpose-built hospice, was established. The hospice was founded on the principles of combining teaching and clinical research, expert pain and symptom relief with holistic care to meet the physical, social, psychological and spiritual needs of its patients and those of their family and friends. St Christopher's Hospice was developed based on a care philosophy that "you matter because you are you, you matter to the last moment of your life", an approach requiring specialist care which led to a new medical specialty – palliative care – that could be adapted to different situations. Research shows that St Christopher's was quite different from hospitals in the 1960s, designed and managed as a "home from home" where the physical environment was important. It was a place where patients could garden, write, talk – and get their hair done. There was always, Saunders would emphasize, so much more to be done, and she worked in this spirit as its medical director from 1967, and then, from 1985, as its chairperson, a post she occupied until 2000 when she became president.

She was, however, reluctant for St Christopher's to admit patients with AIDS in the years after the syndrome first emerged. In a letter to the Secretary of State for Social Services, she stated, "we have strong reservations about the use of our existing inpatient facilities for AIDS patients", explaining in a memorandum to the Select Committee on Social Services: "A hospice ward is a very personal place, welcoming families, with their children, to be with the dying family member. Among them, I believe, there would be many who would extremely fearful of doing this if they knew AIDS patients were being admitted. However irrational, this fear is a very real matter, and would be an added burden on those facing the loss of loved ones."

Saunders was an Anglican. In 1977, she was awarded an honorary Lambeth doctorate by the Archbishop of Canterbury. She later was made a Dame of the Order of St Gregory the Great (awarded by the Pope)

In 1979, she was appointed Dame Commander of the Order of the British Empire (DBE). In 1981 she was awarded the Templeton Prize, the world's highest-value annual prize awarded to an individual. In 1989, she was appointed to the Order of Merit. In 2001, she received the world's largest humanitarian award, the Conrad N. Hilton Humanitarian Prize, on behalf of St Christopher's.

On 25 April 2005, another portrait of Saunders was unveiled at the National Portrait Gallery. Saunders was one of the subjects of Prime Minister Gordon Brown's book: Courage: Eight Portraits. She was a Fellow of the Royal College of Physicians, a Fellow of the Royal College of Nursing and a Fellow of the Royal College of Surgeons.

St Christopher's includes an arts team that provides art therapy, music therapy, drama therapy and community arts. The work of the arts team is reflected in two publications: End of Life Care: A Guide for Therapists, Artists and Arts Therapists and The Creative Arts in Palliative Care.

== Marriage ==
In 1963, three years after the death of Michniewicz, Saunders became familiar with the paintings of Marian Bohusz-Szyszko, a Polish émigré and professor with a degree in fine art. They met and became friends, and she became a patron of his art. A substantial amount of his work is hung at St Christopher's Hospice.

Bohusz-Szyszko had a long-estranged wife in Poland, whom he supported, and was a devout Roman Catholic. In 1980, five years after the death of his wife, he married Saunders. She was 61 and he was 79. Bohusz-Szyszko died in 1995, at the age of 94, spending his last days at St Christopher's Hospice.

== Charitable organisation ==
In 2002, Saunders co-founded a new charitable organisation, Cicely Saunders International, of which she was the founding trustee and president. The charity's mission is to promote research to improve the care and treatment of all patients with progressive illness and to make high-quality palliative care available to everyone who needs it – hospice, hospital or home. The charity has co-created the world's first purpose built institute of palliative care – the Cicely Saunders Institute, and supported research to improve the management of symptoms such as breathlessness, action to meet more closely patient and family choice in palliative care and better support for older people. Cicely Saunder's obituary in the Royal College of Physicians of London's Munk's Roll collection contains further information about her work with this organisation.

== Medical ethics ==
Saunders was instrumental in the history of UK medical ethics. She was an advisor to Andrew Mephem whose report led the Rev. Edward Shotter to set up the London Medical Group (LMG), a forerunner of the Society for the Study of Medical Ethics, later the Institute of Medical Ethics. She gave one of the first LMG lectures on the subject of pain, developing the talk into "The Nature and Management of Terminal pain" by 1972.

This went on to be one of the most often repeated and requested lectures of the LMG and other such Medical Groups that sprung up around Great Britain, where it was often given as their inaugural lecture. Her talk on the care of the dying patient was printed by the LMG in its series 'Documentation in Medical Ethics, a forerunner of the Journal of Medical Ethics.

She strongly opposed voluntary euthanasia. This was partly because of her Christian faith, but she also argued that it is never needed, because effective pain control is always possible. She did, however, accept that both sides in the euthanasia debate were against unnecessary pain and the loss of personal dignity.

== Total pain ==
Saunders introduced the idea of "total pain", which included physical, emotional, social, and spiritual distress.

== Death ==
Saunders developed breast cancer but still continued to work. She died aged 87 in 2005 at St Christopher's Hospice.

== Biographies ==
She is the subject of a biography, Cicely Saunders: A Life and Legacy, published in 2018 to mark the 100th anniversary of her birth, and of the biographical novel Di cosa è fatta la speranza. Il romanzo di Cicely Saunders by Emmanuel Exitu, published in Italy by Bompiani editore.

== Honours ==
- Member of the Order of Merit (OM)
- Dame Commander of the Order of the British Empire (DBE)
- Fellow of the Royal College of Surgeons (FRCS)
- Fellow of the Royal College of Physicians (FRCP)
- Fellow of the Royal College of Nursing (FRCN)
- Dame of the Order of St Gregory the Great (awarded by the Pope)

== See also ==
- Thelma Bates, the oncologist who established Britain's first hospital-based palliative care service and worked with Saunders
