= Ruth McCorkle =

American nurse

Margaret Ruth McCorkle FAAN, FAPOS (March 4, 1941, in Johnson City, Tennessee – August 17, 2019, in Hamden, Connecticut) was an American nurse, oncology researcher, and educator. She was the Florence Schorske Wald Professor of Nursing at the Yale School of Nursing.

McCorkle's professional biography included research and working as a professor of nursing at the University of Washington School of Nursing in Seattle, Washington, and as a professor of nursing at the University of Pennsylvania School of Nursing and an associate director of cancer control at the University of Pennsylvania Cancer Comprehensive Center in Philadelphia, Pennsylvania.

McCorkle was a prolific writer and her published research appears in many professional nursing and medical journals in the United States and abroad. She received many prestigious awards for her ground-breaking research. Most notably, she was the first non-medical research recipient of a National Cancer Institute Research Training Grant and this opened the door for other disciplines to apply for these training grants. She was elected to the Institute of Medicine in 1990.

== Graduate education ==
McCorkle went to the University of Iowa School of Nursing for her masters in medical-surgical nursing. After graduation, she worked as a Clinical Nurse Specialist (CNS) in oncology at the University of Iowa Hospital. During her time as a CNS she studied how cancer patients were able to manage their symptoms during their treatment and studied their responses to progression of their disease.

=== Transition to research ===
McCorkle wanted to better understand management of terminal cancer patients. In 1972, she went to London, England, to study under the internationally renowned founder of hospice care, physician Dame Cicely Saunders at St. Christopher's Hospice. At St. Christopher's Hospice she observed how chronically and terminally ill cancer patients were managed. It was at St. Christopher's Hospice that she began to recognize the interdisciplinary help that cancer patients and their families needed after a diagnosis of cancer. She realized that advanced practice nurses (APNs) could help cancer patients and their families better coordinate care. Her hope was that hospice care would become a reality for Americans.

=== Doctoral education ===
In 1973 McCorkle returned to the United States to continue to study the role of advanced practice nurses in cancer patients and their families care. She went to the University of Southern California to study at the Ethel Percy Andrus Gerontology Center. In 1975, she obtained her PhD from the University of Iowa in Mass Communication at the School of Journalism. Her dissertation was a qualitative study designed to describe what happens to patients and their families’ attachments and intended goals during a diagnosis of lung cancer overtime.

After graduation, she moved to Seattle to work with Jeanne Quint Benoliel, an international nurse leader in death and dying at the University of Washington. They worked together for over 10 years and developed a graduate program, the Oncology Transition Program, to prepare advanced practice nurses to deliver nursing interventions for patients and their families across the cancer trajectory.

== Academic career and research findings ==
McCorkle's primary research interest was the role of advanced practice nurses in managing the care of the cancer patient and family. Her interest in care for terminally ill cancer patients began during her time as Clinical Nurse Specialist in Iowa where she learned the care and management of terminally ill patients. In Seattle she and Benoliel developed the Symptom Distress Scale and the Enforced Social Dependency Scale, both groundbreaking scales that measured patient and family outcomes associated with involvement of an advanced practice nurse.

McCorkle received funding for her research from the National Institute of Health and the American Cancer Society to conduct seven randomized clinical intervention studies delivered by advanced practice nurses to cancer patients and their families. Three of her most important interventional studies are described in detail in this Wikipedia article.

=== Development of the Symptom Distress Scale ===
The Symptom Distress Scale (SDS) was one of McCorkle's most notable achievements. Drs. McCorkle and Kathy Young Graham developed and tested SDS at the University of Washington from 1976 to 1978.

The SDS is a scale that measures the degree of discomfort from specific symptoms reported by the patient. The original scale contains 13 symptoms: nausea (presence and intensity), appetite, insomnia, pain (presence and intensity), fatigue, bowel patterns, concentration, dyspnea, appearance, outlook and cough. The symptoms are placed on 5 x 7 index cards with Likert-response ratings ranging from 1 (normal or no distress) to 5 (extensive distress). It is a tool that healthcare providers use today to evaluate the symptoms of their cancer patients.

=== Research studies ===
==== Evaluation of Cancer Management ====
McCorkle's premiere study was the “Evaluation of Cancer Management.” From 1983-1986 she designed a Randomized Control Trial (RCT) to test the efficacy of home care interventions provided by APNs in the Seattle community. Patients with lung cancer were assigned to one of three groups: an APN group that received oncology home care (OHC) education, standard home care (SHC) group that received care from the traditionally prepared home care nurse, or an office care (OC) group that received usual outpatient care. McCorkle found that patients who received care in the OHC group and patients in the SHC group remained physically and socially independent longer than patients in the OC group. The APNs helped to minimize symptom distress and maintain independence longer compared to patients in the OC group. In addition, patients enrolled in OHC had fewer re-hospitalizations from complications of their cancer therapies compared to patients enrolled in SHC or OC.

==== Spouse bereavement ====
McCorkle became aware of the responsibility of the caregiver during her first study, so in 1986-1988 she and her colleagues extended their study to include caregivers. They tested how the OHC intervention for terminally ill cancer patients affected caregiver distress during the bereavement period. The APNs assisted families through the living-dying transition of the illness trajectory. In the OHC group the trained APNs taught families about symptom management and comfort care. The OHC group proved an overall decrease in psychological distress between the caregivers who interacted with trained APNs.

==== Quality of life in older people after surgery ====
In 1992-1996 she launched an RCT to test the effects of APNs role in quality of life outcomes of newly diagnosed post-surgical older cancer patients and their caregiver's psychological status at the cancer patient's discharge. Patients were randomly assigned to the experimental group where APNs were highly trained in post-operative oncology care. The patients in the control group received standard post-operative care. The APNs in the experimental group were trained with specific guidelines to help cancer patients recover post-operatively to improve quality of life and extend survival. The study found more cancer patients died in the control group than in the experimental intervention group.

The psychological status of the caregivers improved from baseline and then stabilized. However, for a subgroup of caregivers who had physical health problems, the psychological status of those in the treatment group declined over time compared to those in the control group. McCorkle concluded that cancer patient's caregivers who had physical problems of their own were at higher risk for psychologic morbidity when they became caregivers.

== Boards ==
McCorkle served on many boards of nursing. She was the first research chair of the Oncology Nursing Society. She served on Study Sections for the National Cancer Institute and the National Institute of Nursing Research. She resided on the board of directors for the American Psychosocial Oncology Society (APOS) and was a past president of the organization. She served on the American Cancer Society Board of Directors, Philadelphia Division. She served on the Editorial Board for the journal, Cancer Nursing Practice, Journal of Palliative Medicine, Journal of Nursing and Health Care of Chronic Illness and Psycho-Oncology, and she reviewed for many prestigious journals including: The Cancer Journal, Journal of Pain and Symptom Management, The New England Journal of Medicine, and the Journal of Clinical Oncology.

=== International Nurses Association ===
In 1985, McCorkle joined Robert Tiffany, a British nurse and Fellow of the Royal College of Nursing with others to found the International Nurses Association and the International Society of Nurses in Cancer Care. In 2004, the International Nurses Association and the World Health Organization formed a coalition.

== Awards ==
Throughout her research career McCorkle was granted a number of prestigious awards. In 1979 she was elected by the American Nurses Association as Fellow of the American Academy of Nursing. In 1990 she was elected to the Institute of Medicine National Academy of Sciences. In 1993 in Washington, D.C., she was awarded the Nurse Scientist of the Year by the Council of Nurse Researchers. In 2001 she became the Florence S. Wald Professor at the Yale School of Nursing. In 2007 in New Orleans she received the Distinguished Research Award from the National Hospice and Palliative Care Organization. In 2009 in Vienna, Austria she received the Bernard Fox Memorial Research Award from the International Psycho-Oncology Society. In 2014 in Hong Kong she was elected to Sigma Theta Tau International Nurse Researcher Hall of Fame. In 2015, she was recognized as one of twenty-five Visionary Nurse Leaders at the University of Maryland School of Nursing 125th anniversary. In 2017 she received the Lifetime Achievement Award from the Yale Cancer Center. In 2018 she was named a Living Legend of the American Academy of Nursing.
