= Palliative sedation =

Sedation of the terminally ill

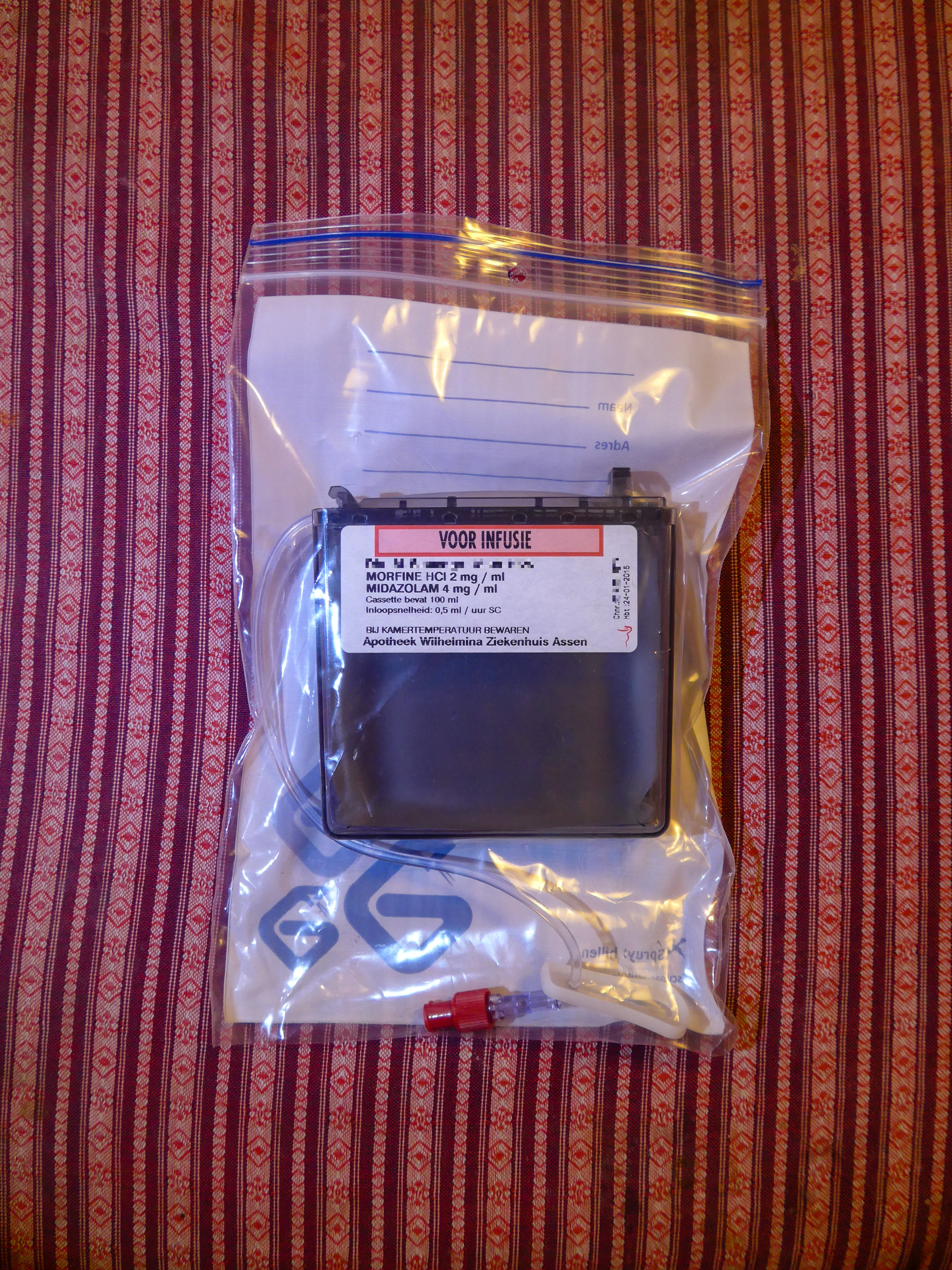
Infusion pump reservoir containing midazolam and morphine, used for the palliative sedation of a terminal cancer patient.

In medicine, specifically in end-of-life care, palliative sedation (also known as terminal sedation, continuous deep sedation, or sedation for intractable distress of a dying patient) is the palliative practice of relieving distress in a terminally ill person in the last hours or days of a dying person's life, usually by means of a continuous intravenous or subcutaneous infusion of a sedative drug, or by means of a specialized catheter designed to provide comfortable and discreet administration of ongoing medications via the rectal route.

Sometimes palliative sedation results in only a light unconsciousness, in which the patient may still be somewhat aware of the presence of others. In other cases it results in a deep unconsciousness, like coma.

As of 2013, approximately tens of millions of people a year were unable to resolve their needs of physical, psychological, or spiritual suffering at their time of death. Due to the amount of pain a dying person may face, palliative care is considered important. Proponents claim palliative sedation can provide a more peaceful and ethical solution for such people.

Palliative sedation is an option of last resort for the people whose symptoms cannot be controlled by any other means. In most cases, it is not considered a form of euthanasia or physician-assisted suicide, as the ostensible goal of palliative sedation is to control symptoms, rather than to shorten or end the person's life.

Palliative sedation is legal everywhere and has been administered since the hospice care movement began in the 1960s. The practice of palliative sedation has been a topic of debate and controversy as many view it as a form of slow euthanasia or mercy killing, associated with many ethical questions. Discussion of this practice occurs in medical literature, but there is no consensus because of unclear definitions and guidelines, with many differences in practice across the world.

== Definition ==
Palliative sedation is the use of sedative medications to relieve refractory symptoms when all other interventions have failed. The phrase "terminal sedation" was initially used to describe the practice of sedation at end of life, but was changed due to ambiguity as to what the word 'terminal' meant. The term "palliative sedation" was then used to emphasize palliative care. The level of sedation via palliative sedation may be mild, intermediate or deep and the medications may be administered intermittently or continuously.

Sedation is generally administered at the lowest level necessary to provide adequate relief of suffering, an approach termed "proportionate palliative sedation". This principle of proportionality has been incorporated into definitions of palliative sedation, such that sedation that does not meet this principle (e.g., deep sedation for relatively moderate symptoms) is generally not considered palliative sedation.

The term "refractory symptoms" is defined as symptoms that cannot be controlled despite the use of extensive therapeutic resources, with such symptoms having an intolerable effect on the patient's well-being in the final stages of life. The symptoms may be physical, psychological, or both.

== General practice ==
=== Palliative care ===
Palliative care is aimed to relieve suffering and improve the quality of life for people with serious and/or life-threatening illness in all stages of disease, as well as for their families. It can be provided either as an add-on therapy to the primary curative treatment or as a monotherapy for people who are on end-of-life care. In general, palliative care focuses on managing symptoms, including but not limited to pain, insomnia, mental alterations, fatigue, difficulty breathing, and eating disorders. In order to initiate the care, self-reported information is considered the primary data to assess the symptoms along with other physical examinations and laboratory tests. However, in people at the advanced stage of the disease with potential experience of physical fatigue, mental confusion or delirium which prevent them from fully cooperating with the care team, a comprehensive symptom assessment can be utilized to fully capture all symptoms as well as their severity.

There are multiple interventions that can be used to manage the conditions depending on the frequency and severity of the symptoms, including using medications (i.e. opioid in cancer-related pain), physical therapy/modification (i.e. frequent oral hygiene for xerostomia/dry mouth treatment), or reversal of precipitating causes (i.e. low fiber diet or dehydration in constipation management).

=== Palliative sedation ===
Palliative sedation is the last resort if a person's symptoms cannot be managed with other therapies. Symptoms may include pain, delirium, dyspnea, and severe psychological distress.

In terms of the initiation of palliative sedation, it should be a shared clinical decision initiated preferably between the person receiving treatment and the care team. If severe mental alterations or delirium is the concern for the person to make an informed decision, consent can be obtained in the early stage of the disease or upon the admission to the hospice facility. Family members can only participate in the decision-making process if explicitly requested by the person in care.

Palliative sedation can be used for short periods with the plan to awaken the person after a given time period, making terminal sedation a less correct term. The person is sedated while symptom control is attempted, then the person is awakened to see if symptom control is achieved. In some cases (i.e. for those whose life expectancy is hours or days at the most), palliative sedation is begun with the plan to not attempt to reawaken the person.

=== Assessment and obtaining consent ===
Despite best practice palliative care, refractory symptoms can occur. Intentionally sedating a person may be the best option to alleviate intolerable symptoms and suffering. Prior to receiving palliative sedation, persons should undergo careful consideration along with their health care team to make sure all other resources and treatment strategies have been exhausted. In the case the person is unable to participate in decision making, the individual's family member should be consulted. Addressing the distress of family members is also a key component and goal of palliative care and palliative sedation.

The first step in consideration of palliative sedation is assessment of the person seeking the treatment.

There are several states that one may be in that can make palliative sedation the preferred treatment, including but not limited to physical and psychological pain and severe emotional distress. More often than not, refractory or intolerable symptoms give a more sound reason to pursue palliative sedation. Though the interdisciplinary health care team is there to help each person make the most sound medical decision, the individual's judgement is considered to be the most accurate in deciding whether or not their suffering is manageable.

According to a systematic review encompassing over thirty peer-reviewed research studies, 68% of the studies used stated physical symptoms as the primary reason for palliative sedation. The individuals involved in the included studies were terminally ill or suffering from refractory and intolerable symptoms. Medical conditions that had the most compelling reasons for palliative sedation were not only limited to intolerable pain, but include psychological symptoms such as delirium accompanied by uncontrollable psychomotor agitation. Severe trouble breathing (dyspnea) or respiratory distress were also considered a more urgent reason for pursuing palliative sedation. Other symptoms such as fatigue, nausea, and vomiting were also reasons for palliative sedation.

Once the assessment is completed and palliative sedation has been decided for the person, a written consent for administration to proceed may be given by the individual. This may be mandatory in some jurisdictions. The consent (if mandated) must state their agreement for sedation and lowering their consciousness, regardless of each individual's stage in illness or the treatment period of palliative sedation. In order to make a decision, one must be sufficiently informed of their disease state, the specificities and implications of treatment, and potential risks they may face during the treatment. At the time of consent, the person should fully be aware of and understand all necessary legal and medical consequences of palliative sedation. It is also critical that the individual is making the decision upon their own free will, and not under coercion of any sort. The only exception where the individual's consent is not obtained would be in emergency medical situations where one is incapable of making a decision, in which the individual's family or caregiver must give the consent after adequate education, as one would have been given.

In many situations, palliative sedation is the only route to good symptom control at the end of life, and does not need written consent. Shared decision making with the patient (if possible) and family members should occur during this process.

=== Continuous vs. intermittent sedation ===
Palliative sedation can be administered continuously, until the person's death, or intermittently, with the intention to discontinue the sedation at an agreed upon time. Although not as common, intermittent sedation allows family members of the person to gradually come to terms with their grief and while still relieving the individual of their distress. During intermittent palliative sedation, the person is still able to communicate with their family members. Intermittent sedation is recommended by some authorities for use prior to continuous infusion to provide the person with some relief from distress while still maintaining interactive function.

== Sedative medications ==
=== Sedating agents ===
Benzodiazepines: This is a drug class that works on the central nervous system to tackle a variety of medical conditions, such as seizures, anxiety, and depression. As benzodiazepines suppress the activities of nerves in the brain, they also create a sedating effect which is utilized for multiple medical procedures and purposes. Among all benzodiazepine agents, midazolam is the most frequently used medication for palliative sedation for its rapid onset and short duration of action. The main indications for midazolam in palliative sedation are to control delirium and alleviate breathing difficulties so as to minimize distress and prevent exacerbation of these symptoms.

Opioids: Opioids (e.g., morphine) can be used as an analgesics (pain relief) but should not be used to induce sedation. The optimal balance of effect (analgesia ie pain relief) versus side effect (drowsiness) of opioids depends on a person's individual situation. In some settings. drowsiness as a side effect of good pain control may be acceptable, but opioids are not generally used with the primary goal of sedation.

Other agents: Levomepromazine is a sedating antipsychotic that can be used for palliative sedation. As third-line therapy, phenobarbital can be used.

=== Administration and monitoring ===
Palliative sedation is administered commonly in hospital or inpatient settings, but also reported to be performed in home care settings. The medication prescribed for palliation will need dose titration to initially manage the refractory symptoms and relieve suffering, and therapy will continue to maintain adequate effect. Prescribed sedatives can be administered intravenously, rectally, etc. on a continuous and/or intermittent basis. When breakthrough symptoms occur, emergency bolus therapy will be needed to maintain symptom management. Both mild and deep levels of sedation may be used to provide relief from suffering, with deeper levels used when death is imminent and a catastrophic event has occurred.

The person being treated will be monitored during palliative sedation to maintain adequate symptom relief, but the following clinical situations will determine a need for dose titration:

- Person is at end-of-life: Vitals are not monitored except for respiratory rate to assess respiratory distress and tachypnea. The goal is to achieve comfort, so downward titration of sedation is not recommended due to risk of recurrent distress.
- Person is nearing end-of-life: Vitals such as heart rate, blood pressure, and oxygen saturation, are monitored to maintain physiological stability through sedation. Depending on the risk of a person to have respiratory depression or become unstable, the treatment dose may need to be adjusted or a benzodiazepine antagonist may be administered.
- Suffering managed and symptom controlled: Sedation may be carefully lowered for lucidity. This would provide possibility of reevaluating the person's preferences for care or allow family communication.

== Nutrition and fluids ==
As people undergoing terminal sedation are typically in the last hours or days of their lives, they are not usually eating or drinking significant amounts. There have not been any conclusive studies to demonstrate benefit to initiating artificial nutrition (TPN, tube feedings, etc.) or artificial hydration (subcutaneous or intravenous fluids). There is also a risk that IV fluids or feedings can worsen symptoms, especially respiratory secretions and pulmonary congestion. If the goal of palliative sedation is comfort, IV fluids and feedings are often not consistent with this goal.

A specialized rectal catheter can provide an immediate way to administer small volumes of liquids for people in the home setting when the oral route is compromised. Unlike intravenous lines, which usually need to be placed in a hospital environment, the rectal catheter can be placed by a clinician, such as a hospice nurse or home health nurse, in the home. This is useful for people who cannot swallow, including those near the end of life.

Before initiating terminal sedation, a discussion about the risks, benefits and goals of nutrition and fluids is encouraged, and is mandatory in the United Kingdom.

== Sedation vs. euthanasia ==
Titrated sedation might speed up death, although death is considered a side effect and sedation does not equate with euthanasia. A survey of 663 physicians in the United States, found half had an experience of their treatment being characterised as murder, euthanasia, or killing in the preceding five years with palliative sedation (along with stopping of hydration and nutrition) being the most common act in palliative care interpreted as killing.

The primary difference between palliative sedation, relief of severe pain and symptoms, and euthanasia (the intentional ending of a person's life) is both their intent and their outcome. At the end of life sedation is only used if the individuals perceives their distress to be unbearable, and there are no other means of relieving that distress. The intended goal is to provide them some relief of their suffering through the use of benzodiazepines and other agents which inadvertently may increase the risk of death. Studies have been conducted however, showing that the risk of death through palliative sedation is much lower than earlier perceived. This has raised the argument that palliative sedation does not cause or hasten death and that an individual's death following palliative sedation is more likely to be due to their disease—the measure of success of palliative sedation remains relief of a person's symptoms until their end of life. On the other hand, euthanasia is performed with the intent to permanently relieve the person of their pain through death—the measure of success being their death.

In palliative care, the doses of sedatives are titrated (i.e., varied) to keep the individual comfortable without compromising respiration or hastening death. Death typically results from the underlying medical condition.

People (or their legal representatives) only have the right to refuse treatments in living wills; however the demand of life saving treatments, or any treatments at all is controversial among states and heavily depends on each specific situation. However, once unconsciousness begins, as the person is no longer able to decide to stop the sedation or to request food or water, the clinical team can make decisions for the individual. A living will made when competent, can, under UK law, give a directive that the person refuses "Palliative Care" or "Terminal Sedation", or "any drug likely to suppress my respiration."

The use of sedation for palliative care in the UK was considered as part of an independent review of the Liverpool Care Pathway for the Dying Patient. Families of patients in some instances said that they thought the doses of sedatives prevented patients from asking for water leading to death from dehydration, there were many accounts of subcutaneous infusions being started as a matter of course rather than to control a specific symptom, there were many reports of patients being left alone for a short period of time by their families only to find that sedation had been administered leaving them unable to speak to their relatives; relatives and carers reported instances where they felt that the administration of morphine had directly led to the death of a patient.

== Epidemiology ==
=== Prevalence ===
In a review of research articles on various aspects of palliative care, the prevalence of palliative sedation was reported as highly varied. In palliative care units or hospice, the prevalence ranged between 3.1 – 51%. In the home care setting, two Italian studies reported a prevalence of 25% and 52.5%. Hospital-based palliative support teams vary in prevalence, with reports of 1.33% and also 26%. Different countries also report large differences in prevalence of palliative sedation:

Country	Prevalence
Netherlands	10%
Belgium	8.2%
Italy	8.5%
Denmark	2.5%
Switzerland	4.8%
Sweden	3%

A 2009 survey of almost 4000 U.K. people whose care had followed the Liverpool Care Pathway for the Dying Patient found that while 31% had received low doses of medication to control distress from agitation or restlessness, only 4% had required higher doses.

Almost half of the studies reviewed differentiated intermittent versus continuous palliative sedation. The prevalence of intermittent sedation was 30 – 67% of cases and continuous sedation was 14 – 68% of cases. People starting intermittent sedation may progress to use of continuous sedation in 10 – 27% of cases. The prevalence of mild versus deep sedation was also reported: one study reported 51% of cases used mild sedation and 49% deep sedation; a second study reported 80% of cases used mild sedation and 20% deep sedation.

=== Survival ===
There are reports that after initiation of palliative sedation, 38% of people died within 24 hours and 96% of people died within one week. Other studies report a survival time of < 3 weeks in 94% of people after starting palliative sedation. Some physicians estimate that this practice shortens life by ≤24 hours for 40% of people and > 1 week for 27% of people. Another study reported people receiving sedation in their last week of life survived longer than those who did not receive sedation, or only received sedation during last 48 hours of life.

According to 2009 research, 16.5% of all deaths in the United Kingdom during 2007–2008 took place after continuous deep sedation.

== History of hospice ==
=== U.S. hospice care movement ===
Hospice care emphasizes palliative, rather than curative, treatment to support individuals during end-of-life care when all other alternatives have been exhausted. It differs vastly from other forms of healthcare because both the person and the family are included in all decision-making and aims to treat the individual, not the disease. The Hospice Care Movement began in the United States during the 1960s and was influenced heavily on the model published by St. Christopher's Hospice of London located in Great Britain. Despite differing setting, services, and staffing, the U.S. hospice care movement still sought to maintain the goals and philosophy of St. Christopher's model which centered on symptom control to allow the person to die with freedom, rather than attempting curative treatment.

The first Hospice in the United States, Connecticut Hospice, was founded by Florence Wald and opened in 1974. Supporters of the movement faced many challenges early on, the biggest being the lack of insurance coverage for hospice care services. Initiatives to increase public awareness of the movement were created to combat this obstacle and supply the movement with public funding in order to maintain their services. One of the greatest accomplishments made by the movement was in the inclusion of hospice care in services covered under Medicare in 1982. This victory prompted the creation of National Hospice Week by President Reagan to take place from November 7–14 as a form of recognition to the vital impact nurses and caregivers have on these individuals and their families. Less than five decades after the first hospice program began, there are now over 4,000 programs in place under the umbrella of a multi-billion dollar industry. The cumulative budget for hospice programs nationwide increased from 10 million in the late 1970s, to 2.8 billion dollars in 1995, and 10 billion in 2008.

== Policies ==
=== United States ===
In 2008, the American Medical Association Council on Ethical and Judicial Affairs approved an ethical policy regarding the practice of palliative sedation. There is no specific law in barring the practice of palliative sedation, and the U.S. Conference of Catholic Bishops is reported to accept the practice of keeping people pain-free at end of life.

=== Sweden ===
In October 2010 Svenska Läkaresällskapet, the Swedish medical association, published guidelines which allowed for palliative sedation to be administered even with the intent of the terminally ill person not to reawaken.

== See also ==
- Uniform Rights of the Terminally Ill Act (United States)
- Principle of Double Effect
