= Diane E. Meier =

American Geriatrics

- Born: April 15, 1952; Princeton, New Jersey
- Citizenship: American
- Education: Oberlin College, Northwestern University
- Known for: Geriatrics; Palliative Care; Policy/Advocacy
- Awards: MacArthur Fellowship The New York Academy of Medicine 2015 Academy Distinguished Awards
- Scientific career
- Fields: geriatrics, palliative care
- Workplaces: Icahn School of Medicine at Mount Sinai, New York

Diane E. Meier (born April 15, 1952), an American geriatrician and palliative care specialist. In 1999, Dr. Meier founded the Center to Advance Palliative Care, a national organization devoted to increasing access to quality health care in the United States for people living with serious illness. She continues to serve as CAPC's Director Emerita and Strategic Medical Advisor. Meier is also Vice-Chair for Public Policy, Professor of Geriatrics and Palliative Medicine and Catherine Gaisman Professor of Medical Ethics at the Icahn School of Medicine at Mount Sinai Hospital in New York City. Meier was founder and Director of the Hertzberg Palliative Care Institute at the Icahn School of Medicine in New York City from 1997 to 2011.

An expert on palliative medicine, Meier has appeared in media including, CBS Evening News with Scott Pelley, PBS NewsHour, Boston Globe, NewsHour, ABC World News Tonight, The Open Mind with Richard Heffner, The New York Times, the Los Angeles Times, USA Today, the New York Daily News, Newsday, The New Yorker and Newsweek. In 2002, she was featured in the Bill Moyers series On Our Own Terms: Dying in America, a four-part PBS documentary.

Meier has published more than 200 peer-reviewed papers, several books, over twenty-nine book chapters and has been principal investigator on numerous grants. She edited the first textbook on geriatric palliative care, as well as four editions of Geriatric Medicine. Her book, Meeting the Needs of Older Adults with Serious Illness, was published by Springer Publishing in 2014. Palliative Care: Transforming the Care of Serious Illness, was published in 2010.

== Biography ==
Meier was born in Princeton, New Jersey in 1952. She earned a BA in psychology from Oberlin College in 1973 and earned her MD at Northwestern University School of Medicine in Chicago in 1977. She completed both an internship and a residency at Oregon Health Sciences from 1977 to 1981 and completed a fellowship in geriatric medicine at the VA Medical Center in Portland, Oregon.

In 1983, Meier joined the Mount Sinai School of Medicine as an instructor in the Department of Geriatrics and Adult Development. She was named associate professor in 1990 and professor of geriatrics and medicine as well as professor of medical ethics in 1998. From 1995 until 2003 she served as chief of the Division of Geriatrics in Mount Sinai's Department of Medicine, and from 1995 to the present she has directed Mount Sinai's Palliative Care Program. In 1999 she was named director of both the Hertzberg Palliative Care Institute and the Center to Advance Palliative Care.

Since 2000, Meier has sat on the board of the Visiting Nurse Service of New York Hospice Care. She serves or has served on national committees including the National Palliative Care Research Center (Chair, Scientific Advisory Committee) and the U.S. Senate’s Health Care Services Task Force. She sits on the editorial boards of the journals Drugs & Aging, Interdisciplinary Topics in Gerontology, Journal of Palliative Medicine, Journal of Pain and Symptom Management and Internal Medicine News.

== Honors and awards ==
Meier is the recipient of the 2008 MacArthur Fellowship. She received the 2015 Academy Distinguished Award from the New York Academy of Medicine and was listed among New York Magazine's Best Doctors of 2009.

- Alexander Richman Commemorative Award for Humanism in Medicine, Mount Sinai School of Medicine, 1998
- Founders Award of the National Hospice and Palliative Care Organization, April 2007
- MacArthur Fellowship, September 2008
- Gold Humanism Honor Society National Honoree, November 2008
- AARP 50th Anniversary Social Impact Award, November 2008
- American Academy of Hospice and Palliative Medicine Lifetime Achievement Award, March 2009

== Grants ==
Meier's work has been supported by numerous large grants, including:

- Archstone Foundation; Donaghue Foundation; John A. Hartford Foundation; Brookdale Foundation; Milbank Foundation for Rehabilitation; Mill Park Foundation; New York Community Trust; New York State Health Foundation; Olive Branch Fund; Partnership for Palliative Care; Robert Wood Johnson Foundation; The Atlantic Philanthropies; The Fan Fox and Leslie R. Samuels Foundation, Inc. United Hospital Fund; U.S. Department of Veteran Affairs; Y.C. Ho/Helen and Michael Chiang Foundation. December 1999- November 2011; Total direct costs: $36.5 million
- Palliative care for hospitalized cancer patients: National Cancer Institute NCI-NIH (R01 CA116227-01); August 2006 – August 2011; Direct costs: $5.2 million

== Books ==
- Meier, DE, Kelley, Amy S, (eds). Meeting the Needs of Older Adults with Serious Illness: Challenges and Opportunities in the Age of Health Care Reform. Springer: 2014
- Hughes RG, Isaacs SL, Meier DE, (eds). Palliative Care: Transforming the Care of Serious Illness. Wiley/Jossey-Bass: March 2010. ISBN 978-0-470-52717-7
- Cassel CK, Leipzig RM, Cohen HJ, Larson EB, Meier DE, (eds). Geriatric Medicine. 4th ed. New York: Oxford University Press, 2003. ISBN 0-387-95514-3
- Cassel CK, Leipzig RM, Cohen HJ, Larson EB, Meier DE, eds. Geriatric Medicine: An Evidence-Based Approach. 4th ed. New York: Springer-Verlag, 2003. ISBN 0-387-95514-3
- Morrison RS, Meier DE (eds). Geriatric Palliative Care. New York: Oxford University Press, 2003. ISBN 0-19-514191-1

== Publications ==
Partial list:

- Meier DE, Lim B, Carlson MD (2010). "Raising the standard: palliative care in nursing homes". Health Aff (Millwood). 29: 136–40. doi:10.1377/hlthaff.2009.0912. PMID 20048372.
- Meier DE, Casarett DJ, von Gunten CF, Smith WJ, Storey CP (February 2010). "Palliative medicine: politics and policy". J Palliat Med. 13: 141–6. doi:10.1089/jpm.2010.9852. PMID 20043709.
- Adler ED, Goldfinger JZ, Kalman J, Park ME, Meier DE (December 2009). "Palliative care in the treatment of advanced heart failure". Circulation. 120: 2597–606. doi:10.1161/CIRCULATIONAHA.109.869123. PMID 20026792.
- Weissman DE, Morrison RS, Meier DE (February 2010). "Center to Advance Palliative Care palliative care clinical care and customer satisfaction metrics consensus recommendations". J Palliat Med. 13: 179–84. doi:10.1089/jpm.2009.0270. PMID 19922199.
- Meier DE, Beresford L (Jul 2009). "Palliative care seeks its home in national health care reform". Journal of Palliative Medicine. 12 (7): 593–7. doi:10.1089/jpm.2009.9596. PMID 19594342.
- Meier DE (April 2009). "Finding my place". J Palliat Med. 12: 331–5. doi:10.1089/jpm.2009.9644. PMID 19327069.
- Horton JD, Lee S, Brown SR, Bader J, Meier DE (May 2009). "Survival trends in children with hepatoblastoma". Pediatr. Surg. Int. 25: 407–12. doi:10.1007/s00383-009-2349-3. PMID 19308432.
- Weissman DE, Meier DE (Jan 2009). "Center to advance palliative care inpatient unit operational metrics: consensus recommendations". Journal of Palliative Medicine. 12 (1): 21–5. doi:10.1089/jpm.2008.0210. PMID 19284258.
- Meier DE, Beresford L (Jan 2009). "Palliative care cost research can help other palliative care programs make their case". Journal of Palliative Medicine. 12 (1): 15–20. doi:10.1089/jpm.2009.9692. PMID 19284257.
- Weissman DE, Meier DE, Spragens LH (Dec 2008). "Center to Advance Palliative Care palliative care consultation service metrics: consensus recommendations". Journal of Palliative Medicine. 11 (10): 1294–8. doi:10.1089/jpm.2008.0178. PMID 19115885.
- Meier DE (November 2008). "Voices. Why palliative care matters to patients and to your bottom line. Interview by Bill Santamour". Hosp Health Netw. 82: 16, 19. PMID 19093402.
- Weissman DE, Meier DE (Nov 2008). "Operational features for hospital palliative care programs: consensus recommendations". Journal of Palliative Medicine. 11 (9): 1189–94. doi:10.1089/jpm.2008.0149. PMID 19021479.
- Meier DE, Beresford L (Oct 2008). "Palliative care professionals contribute to state legislative and policy initiatives". Journal of Palliative Medicine. 11 (8): 1070–3. doi:10.1089/jpm.2008.9849. PMID 18980444.
- Ferrell B, Connor SR, Cordes A, Dahlin CM, Fine PG, Hutton N, Leenay M, Lentz J, Lund-Person J, Meier DE, Zuroski (2007). "The National Consensus Project and the National Quality Forum". Journal of Pain and Symptom Management. 33: 737–744. doi:10.1016/j.jpainsymman.2007.02.024. PMID 17531914.
- Morrison RS, Meier DE, Fischberg D; et al. (May 2006). "Improving the management of pain in hospitalized adults". Arch. Intern. Med. 166: 1033–9. doi:10.1001/archinte.166.9.1033. PMC 3045761. PMID 16682579.
- Meier D (2005). "Palliative care as a quality improvement strategy for advanced, chronic illness". J Healthc Qual. 27: 33–9. PMID 16416890.
- Nelson JE, Meier DE, Litke A, Natale DA, Siegel RE, Morrison RS (2004). "The symptom burden of chronic critical illness". Critical Care Medicine. 32: 1527–1534. PMID 15241097.
- Morrison RS, Meier DE (2004). "Clinical Practice. Palliative care". The New England Journal of Medicine. 350 (25): 2582–90. doi:10.1056/NEJMcp035232. PMID 15201415.
- Meier DE. United States (2002). "Overview of cancer pain and palliative care". Journal of Pain and Symptom Management. 24: 265–269. PMID 12231160.
- Meier DE, Back A, Morrison RS (2001). "The inner life of physicians and the care of the seriously ill". JAMA. 286: 3007–3014. PMID 11743845.
