= Cara Tannenbaum =

Canadian researcher and physician

Cara Tannenbaum CM
- Education: McGill University
- Known for: Gender and Health
- Scientific career
- Fields: geriatrics, women's health and gender research
- Workplaces: Université de Montréal

Cara Tannenbaum CM is a Canadian researcher and physician in the fields of geriatrics, women's health, and gender research. From 2015-2022, Tannenbaum served as the Scientific Director of Canadian Institutes of Health Research's Institute of Gender and Health. She was appointed as a Member of the Order of Canada on November 17, 2021.

== Career ==
Tannenbaum completed medical school (1994), additional training in geriatrics (2000), and a Master of Science degree in epidemiology and biostatistics (2002) at McGill University. She is now a professor of medicine and pharmacy at the Université de Montréal, where she conducts research at the Centre de recherche de l'Institut universitaire de gériatrie de Montréal. In 2015, Tannenbaum was appointed Scientific Director of the Institute of Gender and Health at the Canadian Institutes of Health Research and was appointed Departmental Science Advisor for Health Canada in 2019.

=== Research ===
Tannenbaum was initially involved in the EMPOWER (Eliminating Medications Through Patient Ownership of End Results) trial, which is an educational intervention (using a theory-based patient handout) to engage older adults with their pharmacist or physician in discontinuing inappropriate medication. The EMPOWER trial resulted in 27% of participants in the intervention group discontinuing their benzodiazepine use (compared with 5% of the control group) at six months. Through this trial, Tannenbaum and her colleagues found that two-thirds of individuals who received EMPOWER handouts had taken it to their doctor or pharmacist, but in about half of these instances, the health care professionals discouraged deprescribing. This prompted Tannenbaum to launch and oversee the D-PRESCRIBE clinical trial, which tested whether a pharmacist-led educational intervention could decrease the number of prescriptions issued for inappropriate medication among 489 older adults in Quebec. The trial found that a pharmacist intervention resulted in greater medication discontinuation (43%) at six months than those receiving regular care.

Between May 2013 and July 2017, Tannenbaum led the international "Dare to Age Well for Women" urinary incontinence trial (also referred to as the CACTUS-D i.e. Continence Across Continents To Upend Stigma and Dependency), which was a randomised controlled trial to test the effect of a continence promotion intervention on the urinary symptoms and quality of life in 910 women, aged 65 or older, in the United Kingdom, France, and Canada (Alberta, Quebec). So far, results from the women recruited from the UK indicate that participants in the combined intervention group had the highest rate of urinary symptom improvement, and that the recruitment rate for local community organizations was as high as 44%.

Tannenbaum co-founded the Canadian Deprescribing Network (CaDeN), and previously served as a co-director.

During the COVID-19 pandemic, Tannenbaum has served on the Canada Chief Science Advisor's Expert Group on Health Systems, and helped lead the implementation efforts for CanCOVID, a Canada-wide network of over 3,000 health, science and policy researchers to facilitate COVID-19 research collaboration. With Holly Witteman and Jenna Haverfield, Tannenbaum found that when the Canadian Institutes of Health Research implemented data-driven gender policy interventions in a second COVID-19 funding competition (April-May 2020), the funding competition received more grant applications from female scientists, and received and funded more grant applications which considered sex and gender in their study design.

Tannenbaum has published over 200 academic publications, which have been cited over 6,500 times, resulting in a h-index and i10-index of 42 and 101 respectively.

=== Awards, honours and public engagement ===
In 2018, Tannenbaum was inducted as a fellow of the Canadian Academy of Health Sciences. She has been awarded the Association of Faculties of Medicine of Canada's May-Cohen Gender Equity Award, the Canadian Institutes of Health Research's Betty Haven's Knowledge Transfer Prize in Aging, the Society of Chemical Industry Purvis Memorial Award (2020) and the American Society for Clinical Pharmacology & Therapeutics' William B. Abrams Awards in Geriatric Clinical Pharmacology (2021), and is the Michel-Saucier Endowed Chair in Geriatric Pharmacology, Health and Aging. In 2020, Tannenbaum was awarded the Canadian Science Policy Centre's Exceptional Contribution to Science Policy Award: Trailblazer Award.

On November 17, 2021, Tannenbaum was appointed as a Member of the Order of Canada for "her leadership in geriatrics, women's health and gender research, and for her inter-professional collaborations to optimize healthy aging across the lifespan".

Tannenbaum has also written editorials regarding various issues related to her research expertise, including an editorial in The BMJ to address the International Association of Athletics Federations' new "differences of sex development" rules causing Caster Semenya to no longer be eligible, and why sex and gender matter in implementation research in the BMC Medical Research Methodology.

== Selected bibliography ==
- Tannenbaum, Cara, Philippe Martin, Robyn Tamblyn, Andrea Benedetti, and Sara Ahmed. "Reduction of inappropriate benzodiazepine prescriptions among older adults through direct patient education: the EMPOWER cluster randomized trial." JAMA Internal Medicine 174, no. 6 (2014): 890-898.
- Tannenbaum, Cara, Julie Clark, Kevin Schwartzman, Sylvan Wallenstein, Robert Lapinski, Diane Meier, and Marjorie Luckey. "Yield of laboratory testing to identify secondary contributors to osteoporosis in otherwise healthy women." The Journal of Clinical Endocrinology & Metabolism 87, no. 10 (2002): 4431-4437.
- Andersson, Karl-Erik, Christopher R. Chapple, Linda Cardozo, Francisco Cruz, Hashim Hashim, Martin C. Michel, Cara Tannenbaum, and Alan J. Wein. "Pharmacological treatment of overactive bladder: report from the International Consultation on Incontinence." Current Opinion in Urology 19, no. 4 (2009): 380-394.
- Tannenbaum, Cara, Amélie Paquette, Sarah Hilmer, Jayna Holroyd-Leduc, and Ryan Carnahan. "A systematic review of amnestic and non-amnestic mild cognitive impairment induced by anticholinergic, antihistamine, GABAergic and opioid drugs." Drugs & Aging 29, no. 8 (2012): 639-658.
