= Liverpool Care Pathway for the Dying Patient =

Clinical protocol

- Developed by: Royal Liverpool University Hospital
- Introduced: Late 1990s
- Industry: Palliative care
- Superseded by: Individual approach to end of life care for each patient

The Liverpool Care Pathway for the Dying Patient (LCP) was a care pathway in the United Kingdom (excluding Wales) covering palliative care options for patients in the final days or hours of life. It was developed to help doctors and nurses provide quality end-of-life care, to transfer quality end-of-life care from the hospice to hospital setting. The LCP is no longer in routine use after public concerns regarding its nature. Alternative methodologies for advance care planning are now in place to ensure patients are able to have dignity in their final hours of life. Hospitals were also provided cash incentives to achieve targets for the number of patients placed on the LCP.

The Liverpool Care Pathway was developed by Royal Liverpool University Hospital and the Marie Curie Palliative Care Institute in the late 1990s for the care of terminally ill cancer patients. The LCP was then extended to include all patients deemed dying. Its inflexible application by nursing staff of Liverpool Community Health NHS Trust was subject to scrutiny after the poor care delivered to a relative of Rosie Cooper MP.

While the initial reception was positive, it was heavily criticised in the media in 2009 and 2012 following a nationwide roll-out. In July 2013, the Department of Health released a statement which stated the use of the LCP should be "phased out over the next 6-12 months and replaced with an individual approach to end of life care for each patient". However, The Daily Telegraph reported that the programme was just rebranded and that its supposed replacement would "perpetuate many of its worst practices, allowing patients to suffer days of dehydration, or to be sedated, leaving them unable to even ask for food or drink."

== Aims ==
The Pathway was developed to aid members of a multi-disciplinary team in matters relating to continuing medical treatment, discontinuation of treatment and comfort measures during the last days and hours of a patient's life. The Liverpool Care Pathway was organised into sections ensuring that evaluation and care is continuous and consistent. It was not intended to replace the skill and expertise of health professionals.

In the first stage of the pathway a multi-professional team caring for the patient was required to agree that all reversible causes for the patient's conditions have been considered and that the patient was, in fact, dying. The assessment then made suggestions for what palliative care options should be considered and whether non-essential treatments and medications should be discontinued.

In practice, the implementation of this guideline was found to be poor. Many decisions were taken in ward settings without the oversight of experienced doctors of medicine. In almost half of the cases neither patient nor family were consulted or informed that it had been decided to place the patient on the LCP.

The programme suggested the provision of treatments to manage pain, agitation, respiratory tract secretions, nausea and vomiting, or shortness of breath (dyspnoea) that the patient may experience. However, a 2016 Cochrane Systematic Review concluded "there is limited available evidence concerning the clinical, physical, psychological or emotional effectiveness of end-of-life care pathways."

The care was not designed to be a one-way street to death. However, in 2012 controversy arose indicating that in most cases it was, and even patients who might have survived longer otherwise died because of the LCP. In a response to negative media reports, Clare Henry and Professor Mike Richards issued a statement on behalf of the NHS End of Life Care Team, stating that the pathway was reversible, and that approximately 3% of patients initially put on the pathway are removed from the pathway when reassessed.

== Assessment ==
Initial assessments of the effects and value of the pathway were largely positive. A 2003 study published in the International Journal of Palliative Nursing found that nurses saw the pathway as having a generally positive effect on patients and their families. A 2006 study published in the same journal found that, despite some "initial scepticism", the doctors and nurses who were interviewed saw the approach as having a valuable place in hospice care, though its use on "dying" patients on general wards was not addressed. A multi-centre study was published in 2008 in the Journal of Palliative Medicine that found that nurses and relatives thought that the approach improved the management of patients' symptoms, but did not significantly improve communication. The authors concluded that they "consider LCP use beneficial for the care for dying patients and their family."

A 2009 study published in Journal of Pain and Symptom Management studied the impact of the pathway on the end-of-life care of over three hundred patients and found that it produced a large decrease in the use of medication that might shorten life and increased patients' involvement in their medication and care. A 2009 survey of 42 carers providing the pathway was published in the Journal of Palliative Medicine, it found that 84% were "highly satisfied" with the approach and that it enhanced patient dignity, symptom management and communication with families.

Research into its use outside the British healthcare system has not, however, demonstrated the same results: a cluster phase II trial conducted in Italy showed no statistically significant improvement in patients' symptom control. On the other hand, the study did find significant improvements in the other four dimensions it surveyed: respect, kindness and dignity; family emotional support; family self-efficacy; and coordination of care.

Jonathan Potter, the director of the Clinical Effectiveness and Evaluation Unit of the Royal College of Physicians stated in 2009 that their audits showed that "where the Liverpool Care Pathway for the dying patient (LCP) is used, people are receiving high quality clinical care in the last hours and days of life". The 2009 audit looked at end-of-life care in 155 hospitals, and examined the records of about 4,000 patients. A major criticism of this study was that each of the participating hospitals was only asked to submit datasets from 30 patients: arguably, the study was heavily biased by the ability to "cherry-pick" the most favourable datasets, and the lack of availability of all data for independent scrutiny and objective assessment.

Version 12 of the LCP was launched on 8 December 2009, after more than two years of consultation. Among other revisions, it includes new decision-making support on whether or not to start the LCP; highlighted guidance to review the appropriateness of continuing on the pathway at any time if concern is expressed by either the patient, a relative, or a team member; and new prompts to support decisions on artificial nutrition and hydration. An editorial in the BMJ judged the new release did "much to tackle recent criticisms".

== Independent review ==
In July 2013, the results of an independent review into the LCP led by Baroness Neuberger were published. Accepting the review's recommendations, the government advised that NHS hospitals should phase out the use of the LCP over the next 6–12 months, and that "NHS England should work with clinical commissioning groups (CCGs) to bring about an immediate end to local financial incentives for hospitals to promote a certain type of care for dying patients, including the LCP.

== Criticism ==
=== Medical issues ===
A 2008 article in the American Journal of Hospice and Palliative Care criticised the Liverpool Pathway for its traditional approach and not taking an explicit position on the artificial hydration for critically ill patients. A 2009 editorial in the Journal of Clinical Nursing welcomed the impetus towards providing improved care at the end of life and the more widespread use of integrated care pathways, but warned that much more research is needed to assess which of the several approaches that are in use is most effective.

In 2009 The Daily Telegraph wrote that the pathway has been blamed by some doctors for hastening the death of some mortally ill patients, and possibly masking signs that the patient is improving. This story was criticised by the Association for Palliative Medicine and the anti-euthanasia charity Care Not Killing as inaccurate. In contrast, The Times welcomed the pathway as an attempt to address patients' wishes and warned about "alarmist" press coverage of the scheme. A German study in 2015 found no indication of hastening death. One in ten patients improves and leaves the pathway. The other nine die.

=== Media reports ===
The LCP has continued to be controversial. Many witnesses have testified that elderly patients were admitted to hospital for emergency treatment and put on the LCP without documented proof that the patient consented to it, or could not recover from their health problem; 48-year-old Norfolk man Andrew Flanagan was revived by his family and went home for a further five weeks after doctors put him on the LCP. The Royal College of Physicians found that up to half of families were not informed of clinicians' decision to put a relative on the pathway.

In a 2012 letter to The Daily Telegraph, six doctors belonging to the Medical Ethics Alliance, a Christian medical organisation, called on LCP to provide evidence that the pathway is "safe and effective, or even required", arguing that, in the elderly, natural death is more often painless, provision of fluids is the main way of easing thirst, and "no one should be deprived of consciousness except for the gravest reason." In response, 1,300 healthcare workers signed a letter to the Telegraph in support of the LCP, saying it would be the way that they themselves would choose to die.

== Financial inducements to NHS trusts ==
In October 2012 figures released under the Freedom of Information Act showed that some two thirds of NHS trusts had received incentive payments for meeting "targets" for using the LCP, and that such payments totalled £12 million or more.

== See also ==
- End-of-life care
- Medical social work
- Palliative medicine
- Pain management
- Terminal illness
