= Jeanne Quint Benoliel =

American nurse

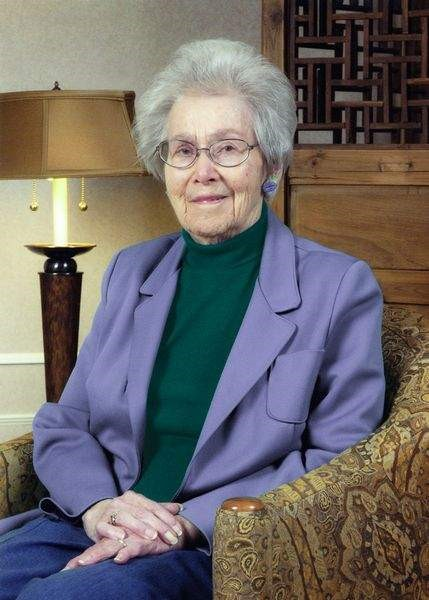
- Born: December 9, 1919; National City, California
- Died: January 23, 2012 (aged 92)
- Occupations: Nurse, academic
- Known for: Contributions to palliative care

Jeanne Quint Benoliel (December 9, 1919 (Note: Some sources list her birth year as 1920.) – January 23, 2012) was an American nurse who studied the role of nursing in end-of-life settings. She founded the Ph.D. program at the University of Washington School of Nursing. She was designated a Living Legend of the American Academy of Nursing.

== Early life and education ==
Jeanne Carolyn Quint Benoliel was born in 1919 in National City, California. Benoliel attended San Diego High School, graduating in 1937. In her last year of high school, she decided to become a nurse, and attended San Diego State College to get her nursing prerequisites. She completed a nursing diploma in 1941 at St. Luke's Hospital in San Francisco, California. Benoliel found her first job as a San Diego County Nurse working with tuberculosis patients, and later joined the Army Nurse Corps during World War II, serving from 1934-1946. She was stationed for nearly two years in New Guinea and the Philippines, where many of her patients suffered from tropical diseases such as malaria and dengue fever. After her time in the Army, she returned to the West Coast. Using the GI bill, Benoliel went on to earn a B.S. degree in Nursing Education at Oregon State University in 1948 while working as a staff nurse, surgical nursing instructor, and educational director in Oregon and California.

Benoliel stated that she was “committed to the idea that work was something women did until they married and had a family.”

== Graduate education ==
=== Master's education ===
Benoliel attended UCLA from 1954-55 for a Masters in Nursing. She continued at UCLA for post-Master's studies in statistics and physiology from 1959-1961 soon after divorcing her husband. She started therapy for her depression to cope with the loss.

In between her studies at UCLA, she worked as an assistant professor in surgical nursing and as the project director for a mastectomy study. Her own research about women after mastectomies led to her to publish four articles. Benoliel later stated that this study piqued her interest in studying the women's experiences of “living with uncertainty and fear of death," and her interest in “mutilating surgeries” and their effect on post-surgical patients.

This time in Benoliel's life involved the deaths of several family members. Her youngest sister suffered an unexpected brain hemorrhage while 8 months pregnant with her fourth child. The lack of discussion around death and dying had a profound effect on Benoliel and contributed to her criticism of “the conspiracy of silence” around death and dying in hospitals.

=== Transition to research ===
During her time at UCLA, Benoliel considered pursuing a doctorate in neurophysiology or statistics. She postponed these plans after meeting Anselm Strauss in San Francisco. He mentored her and taught her how to undertake field research. She began to publish more articles in the field of nursing research while working [null with] Anselm Strauss and Barney Glaser to study the care of terminally ill patients. She was opposed to the use of invasive activities in patient's end of life and advocated for a better quality of life at the end of life.

=== Doctoral education ===
In 1967, Benoliel moved to the University of California, San Francisco to pursue a Doctor of Nursing Science degree in Medical-Surgical Nursing. Her doctoral dissertation was entitled Becoming Diabetic: A Study of Emerging . She also taught a class called “The Threat of Death in Clinical Practice” the same year of the Kent State Shooting. According to Benoliel, the unexpected deaths of young students “confirmed my belief that helping nurses learn how to deal with death-related issues required experiential as well as intellectual learning opportunities.”

In 1969, Benoliel graduated from UCSF and married Robert Benoliel. They moved to the University of Washington where she began working as an associate professor in Nursing.

== Academic career ==
Benoliel began working as full-time faculty at the University of Washington School of Nursing. She and her colleagues decided to create a PhD program in Nursing. In 1974, Benoliel met Ruth McCorkle, who would go on to have a renowned career in Nursing, at the first American Cancer Society National Conference on Cancer Nursing. McCorkle later moved to the University of Washington School of Nursing, and together she and Benoliel obtained a grant to create a Master's program in oncology nursing in 1977. This curriculum, known as the Oncology Transition Services, focused on nursing care in the community for cancer patients at the end of life. In 1976, Benoliel gave the third annual Alexander Ming Fisher Lecture on death and dying at Columbia University Medical Center.

As a faculty member, she also established the Jeanne Q. Benoliel Endowed Fellowship Fund at the University of Washington for doctoral students who studied end-of-life themes. In recognition of her contributions, the school named her the first Elizabeth Sterling Soule Professor of Nursing in 1987.

During this time, she continued to publish research and served on the National Nursing Advisory Committee of ACS. She had visiting professorships in Israel and Japan in the early 1970s, and taught a seminar on “Research in Psychosocial Oncology” in Umea, Sweden . She would go on to teach in Norway, Denmark, and the People's Republic of China. Benoliel was the first nurse to serve as chair of the International Work Group on Death, Dying and Bereavement from 1982-1985.

In 1989, UW hosted a Jeanne Quint Benoliel Celebration Day.

== Retirement ==
After 20 years of teaching at UW, Jeanne Quint Benoliel retired from her UW faculty position in 1990.

After leaving Rutgers, she joined the Ethics Task Force of the Oncology Nursing Society. In 1993, she was awarded the Distinguished Researcher Award from the ONS, as well as an honorary Doctor of Science degree from the University of Pennsylvania for her work.

=== Legacy ===
By the time she retired, Benoliel had published 4 books, 64 chapters in books, 70 journal articles, 15 reviews, and 11 articles reprinted in books or collections. In 2000, Benoliel was designated a Living Legend of the American Academy of Nursing.^{[7]} She was the recipient of the Lifetime Achievement Award from the Oncology Nursing Society.^{[4]} In 2008, she received the Leading the Way Award from the Hospice & Palliative Nurses Association.^{[8]}

Yale University recognized her with an honorary Doctor of Medical Science degree in 2002. She also received honorary degrees from the University of San Diego and the University of Pennsylvania.

Her work, personal journals, and other effects are located in the Barbara Bates Center for the Study of the History of Nursing at the University of Pennsylvania School of Nursing.

== See also ==
- List of Living Legends of the American Academy of Nursing
- Cecily Saunders
- Palliative Care
- Distress in Cancer Caregiving
