= Take Care Utah =

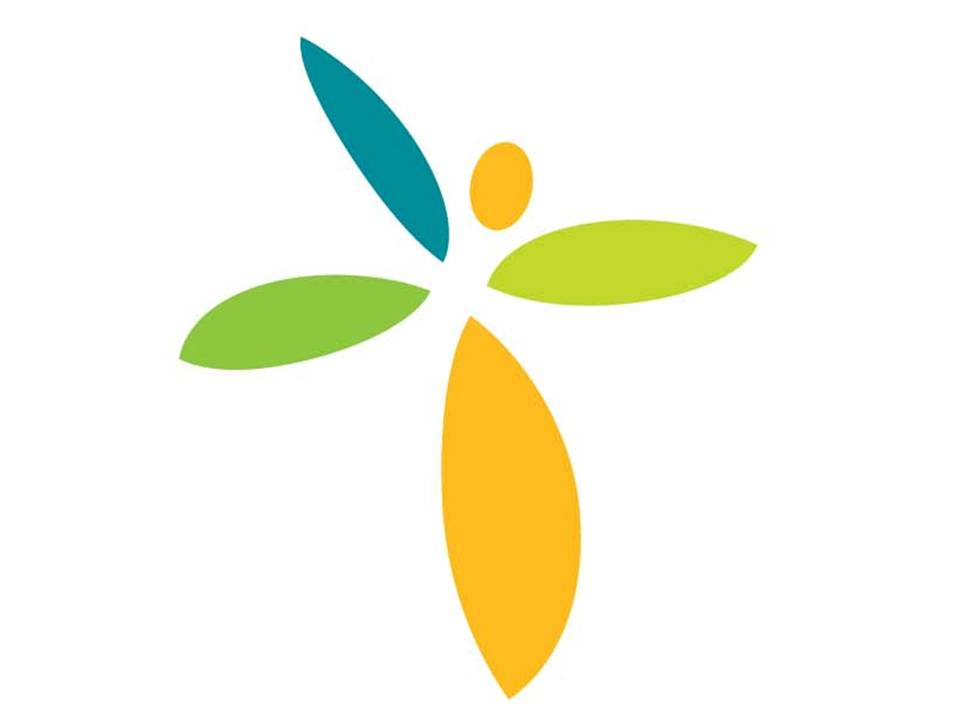
- Formation: 2012
- Type: Nonprofit Organization
- Headquarters: 2369 West Orton Circle Suite 20 West Valley City, UT 84119
- Location: Salt Lake City, Utah
- Executive Director: Matt Slonaker

Take Care Utah is a network of nonprofit organizations and individuals across the state of Utah focused on helping people access health insurance coverage.

== Overview ==
Take Care Utah consists of over 100 enrollment specialists across the state. The network is a program of the Utah Health Policy Project (UHPP), and partners with United Way of Salt Lake, 2-1-1, and the Association for Utah Community Health (AUCH). The organization provides assistance with signing up for health insurance through the Marketplace (Obamacare), Medicaid, and the Children's Health Insurance Program (CHIP). All services are provided free of charge. Many of the people who utilize Take Care Utah's services are referred by 2-1-1 operators who can locate the nearest enrollment specialist to a person's location.

== Funding ==
Take Care Utah's organizations receive funding from several sources, including the competitive Federal Navigator grant which is awarded annually.

== Annual Summit ==
Take Care Utah holds a summit every year in September for all patient navigators and Certified Application Counselors across the state to receive required trainings and set goals.
