= Oncology Care Model =

Medicare payment model for cancer care

The Oncology Care Model (OCM) is an episode-based payment system developed by the Center for Medicare and Medicaid Innovation. The multipayer model is designed for discrete instances of care, especially those involving chemotherapy, which triggers the six-month episode. The program combines fee-for-service (FFS) payments for established services, monthly payments for additional care under a structured guideline, and performance-based payments weighed against quality metrics and benchmarks.

OCM is part of a general move away from the FFS model, "which pays doctors and hospitals according to the number of procedures they do, toward value-based care, which pays based on what helps patients get better." This idea was advanced by the Affordable Care Act (ACA), which was signed into law on March 23, 2010. As of March 18, 2017, OCM is being utilized by 190 healthcare provider groups, which include over 3,000 physicians in the United States. Along with Centers for Medicare and Medicaid Services, the payment system is accepted by 16 other health care coverage programs in the US. The payment model went into operation in July 2016, and barring changes to the Affordable Care Act, is slated to run until 2021. Over this five-year period, it is estimated that the model will be used for $6 billion spent on medical care to 155,000 patients.

The program is a move by the CMS to shift its focus to include specialized care. The bundled design has been the source of praise and criticism for the payment system. The program has been criticized for not going far enough; that is not eliminating FFS altogether. Other criticisms include the lack of flexibility in allowing primary care physicians to conduct care as they see fit, the arbitrary nature of the time period or episode, the cumbersome burden of the reporting standards and how it penalizes practices for outcomes out of their control.

== History ==
The Affordable Care Act mandated the creation of the Center for Medicare and Medicaid Innovation (CMMI) as part of the Centers for Medicare and Medicaid Services (CMS). It was created to test new "payment and delivery system models" to be used by "Medicare, Medicaid, and the Children's Health Insurance Program." The legislation also created the accountable care organizations (ACO) model, which holds voluntarily-enrolled health care practitioners accountable to patients and third-party payers for the quality, appropriateness, and efficiency of its services. ACO introduced the concept of rewards based on savings or "shared savings," which would later be applied to OCM. However, the results were mixed, with "only 31 percent of the nearly 400 ACOs" being successful in seeing returns.

A related program is the Community Oncology Medical Home or COME HOME—a program to develop medical homes as a part of several oncology centers across the US. OCM was based on this earlier model developed by Barbara McAneny and Innovative Oncology Business Solutions through a $20 million grant from the CMMI. COME HOME included provisions which would later be emulated by OCM such as: requirement for use of electronic health records (EHR), patient education, access to 24/7 telephone support and same-day appointments. The program has reported lower rate of hospitalization, use of emergency services and lower cost of care.

In September 2014, while OCM was still in development, the American Society of Clinical Oncology (ASCO) commented on the program, "urging CMS to explore more substantial reforms," and also offered its own alternative payment model. In February 2015, CMMI launched a demonstration program that would include a potential 100 oncology practices and invited other insurance payers to participate. OCM was officially launched on July 1, 2016. It was announced on June 28, as part of Vice President Joe Biden's Cancer Moonshot Summit.

== Design ==
Physicians and Hospitals can earn $160 per patient per month for an entire 6 months which begins at the initiation of chemotherapy treatment. In order to qualify for these payments, the practice has to continually meet the following six care-standards:

- Must provide 24/7 access to a healthcare provider who has access to the practice's medical records,
- Develop and maintain a comprehensive care management plan, as outlined by Institute of Medicine,
- Coordinate care through the use of patient navigators,
- Participants of OCM are obligated to use an Office of the National Coordinator-certified EHR and must attest to stage 1 meaningful use by year one and stage 2 by year three,
- Use accepted clinical treatments based on guidelines
- Report care improvements implemented and clinical outcomes, and use data for continuous quality improvement,

In order to receive performance-based payments, the practices must demonstrate a lowered spending per treatment episode when compared to benchmark standards. The benchmark is determined through the use of a risk-adjustment of expenditures compared to "a historical baseline period trended forward to the current performance period." The program requires that practices report the outcome of their treatments and compares that to quality metrics to determine the level of reimbursement to the practice. A number of healthcare provider groups have announced that they have developed systems of reporting specifically designed for oncology to meet the demands of OCM and its EHR requirements. Some of these include third-parties solutions like Archway Health, Cota Healthcare, Flatiron Health, McKesson Specialty Health, and Navigating Cancer.

== Criticisms ==
In their response to the model, Blase Polite and Harold Miller of the University of Chicago criticized OCM for not going far enough. In their view, the failure to eliminate FFS all together is a primary shortcoming of the payment model. A superficial monthly payment does little to prevent the unnecessary clinic visits doctors are forced to schedule in order to justify fees for actual care provided:

For example, as oncology moves to more oral chemotherapies, it may be more efficient for the practice and less time consuming for the patient to have more frequent phone and electronic check-ins rather than face-to-face visits. Doing that in an FFS-based system translates into significant lost revenue.

They argue that the $160 per-beneficiary-per-month payments are insufficient to alleviate this sort of lose of revenue and the possibility of return-on-savings rarely succeeded in previous ACO models in testing.

There is little scientific basis for the six months length of an episode of care that begins at the initiation of chemotherapy. While some oncology treatments take only mere weeks to complete, others can take the full six months of the episode to complete. However, the physician is paid the full bundle rate for both cases. In fact, if the care of the patient takes a little over six months, the physician is required to maintain care for a second episode and entitled to payments for two bundled episodes. According to Polite and Miller, this creates a "perverse incentive" to the physician to delay ending treatment or delay a portion of the treatment until the second episode in order to demonstrate lowered spending in the first episode, which is a requirement of performance-based payment.

== Participating insurers ==
As of March 18, 2017, the following insurers currently accept the OCM payment system:

- Aetna
- Blue Cross Blue Shield of Michigan
- Blue Cross Blue Shield of New Mexico
- Blue Cross Blue Shield of Oklahoma
- Blue Cross Blue Shield of Texas
- BlueCross BlueShield of South Carolina
- Capital BlueCross (Central Pennsylvania)
- Centers for Medicare and Medicaid Services
- Cigna
- EmblemHealth
- Health Alliance Plan
- Highmark
- Priority Health
- SummaCare
- The University of Arizona Health Plans
- UPMC Health Plan
- VIVA Health
