= European Pathway Association =

European non-profit organisation

The European Pathway Association is a European non-profit organisation which brings together researchers, managers and clinicians on the management concept of clinical pathways. The organisation works on the establishment of clinical care pathways in order to systematically plan and follow up a patient focused care program.

== History ==
In 2003, at the conference of the International Society for Quality in Healthcare (ISQUA) in Dallas (United States), the idea of a European Pathway Association was suggested by Kris Vanhaecht of the Katholieke Universiteit Leuven (Belgium) and Massimiliano Panella of the University of Eastern Piedmont (Italy). On 16 and 17 September 2004, the EPA was founded at a meeting in Jesi (Italy).

== See also ==
- European Institute for Health Records
