= Rectal administration =

Delivery of medication via the rectum

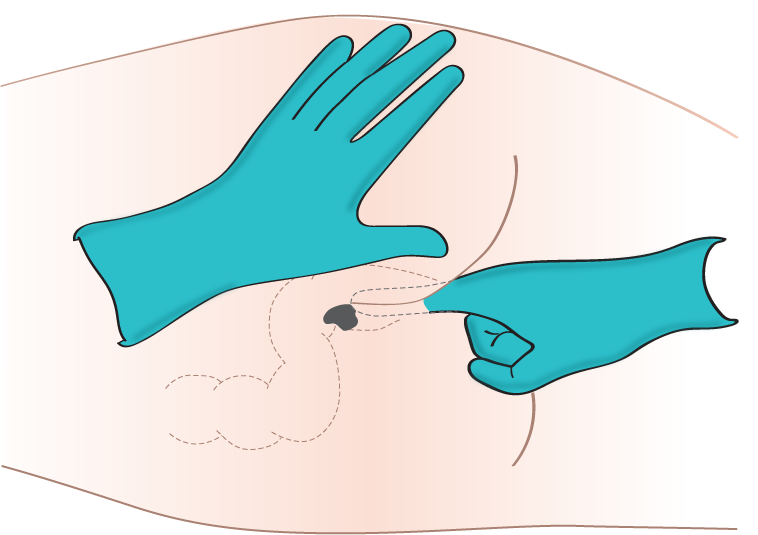
Administering medication rectally

Rectal administration uses the rectum as a route of administration for medication and other fluids, which are absorbed by the rectum's blood vessels, (Note: The rectum has numerous blood vessels available to absorb drugs: upwards ^{2}/_{3}rds of the dose bypasses first-pass metabolism through systemic distribution and the rest is taken through the liver and metabolized via the hepatic portal system.) and flow into the body's circulatory system, which distributes the drug to the body's organs and bodily systems. (Note: The organs and systems include, depending on if the drug is able to pass the blood–brain barrier (BBB) or not, the central nervous system (CNS), peripheral nervous system (PNS), cardiovascular system (CVS), et cetera.)

== Uses ==
=== Medical uses ===
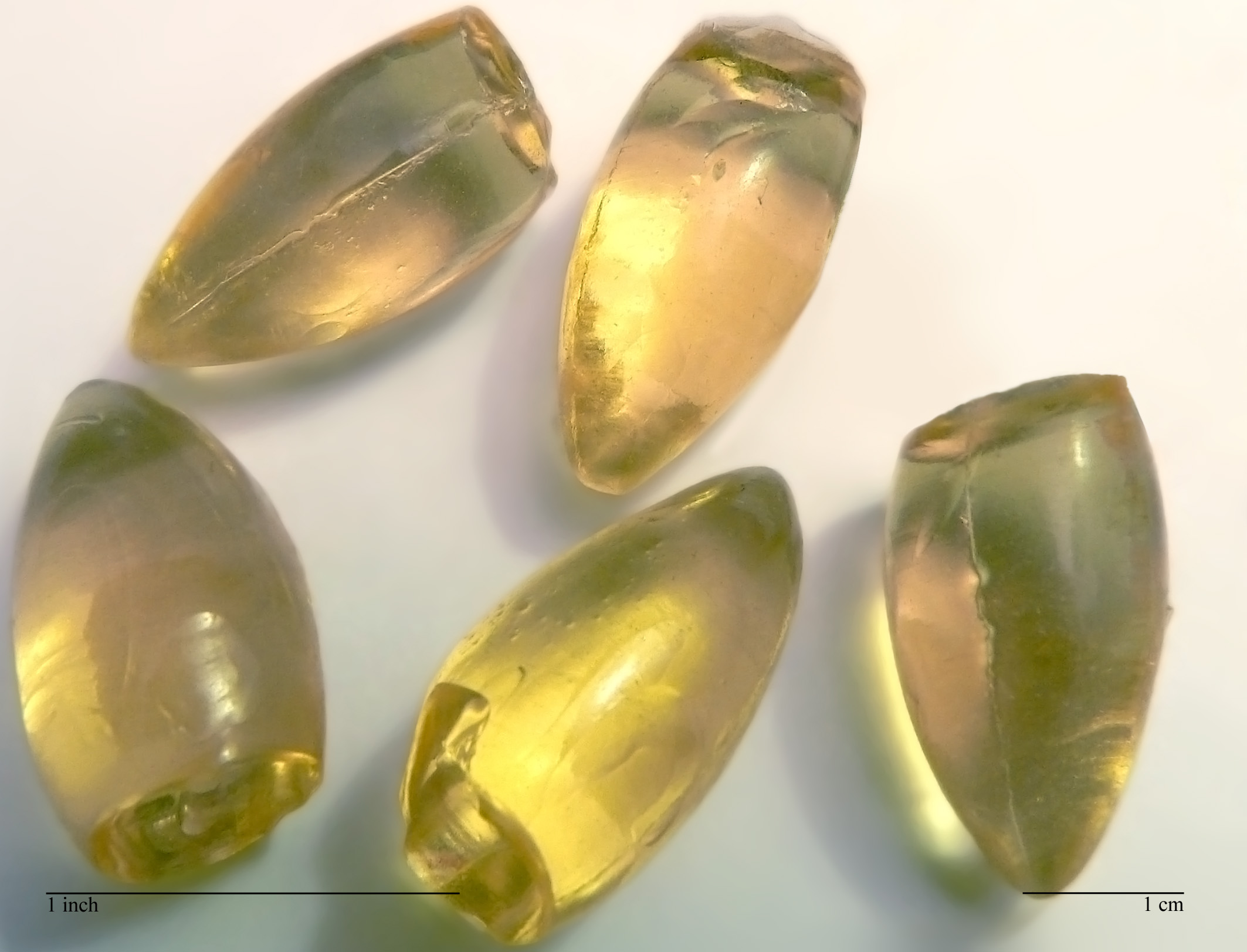
Glycerin (laxative) suppositories for insertion into the rectum.

In addition to pharmacological effects, rectal administration has some properties which can be advantageous for the use in medicine. Rectal administration can allow patients to remain in the home setting when the oral route is compromised. Unlike intravenous lines, which usually need to be placed in an inpatient environment and require special formulation of sterile medications, a specialized rectal catheter can be placed by a clinician, such as a hospice nurse or home health nurse, in the home. Many oral forms of medications can be crushed and suspended in water to be given via a rectal catheter.

The rectal route of administration is useful for patients with any digestive tract motility problem, such as dysphagia, ileus, or bowel obstruction, that would interfere with the progression of the medication through the tract. This often includes patients near the end of life (an estimated 1.65 million people are in hospice care in the US each year). Because using the rectal route enables a rapid, safe, and lower cost alternative to administration of medications, it may also facilitate the care of patients in long-term care or palliative care, or as an alternative to intravenous or subcutaneous medication delivery in other instances.

=== Recreational ===
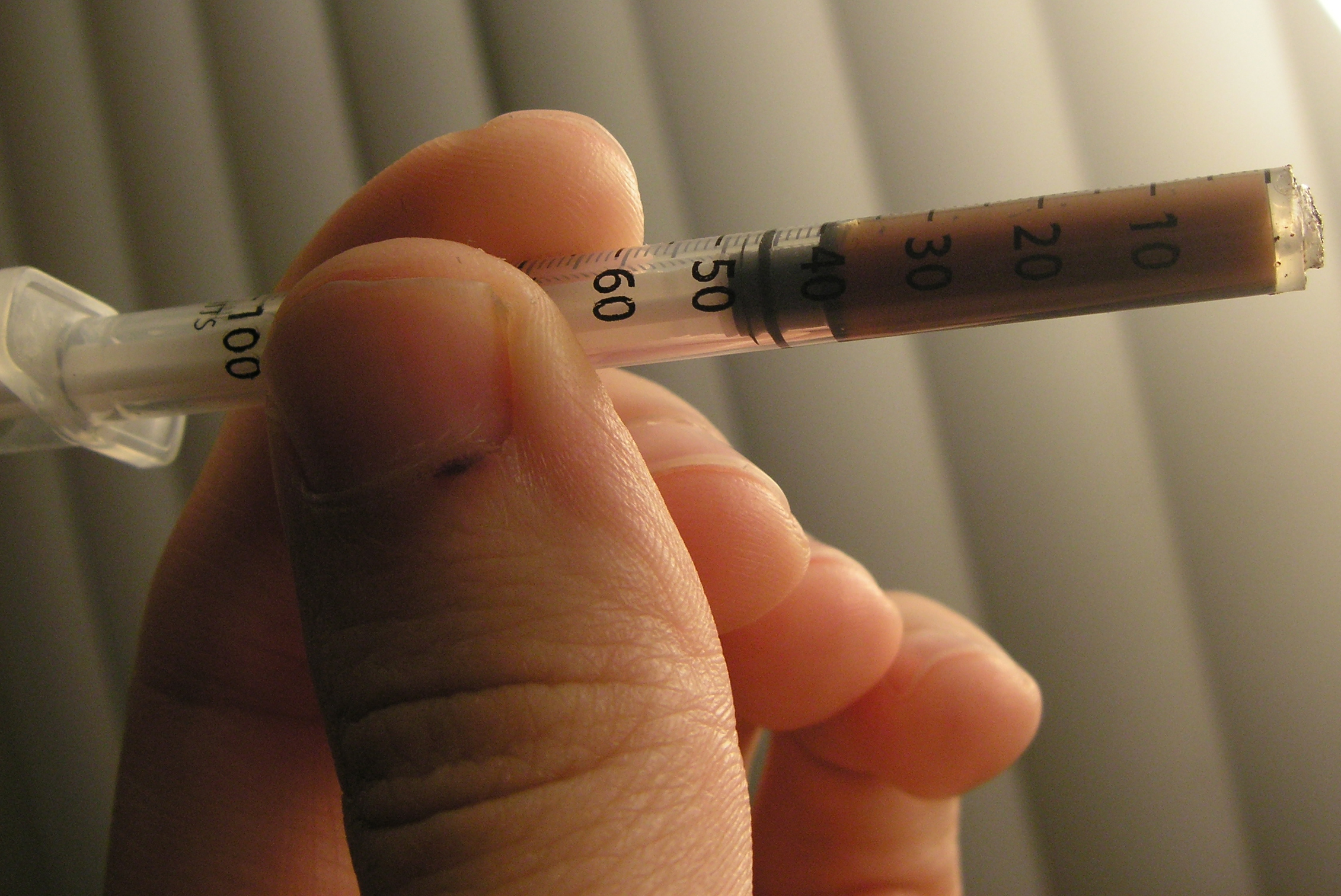
A modified hypodermic syringe used for rectal administration of heroin.

Colloquially known as boofing or plugging, rectal administration is, besides its application in medicine, also employed by users of psychoactive substances. As in the medical procedure, the psychoactive drug is injected via the anus and is absorbed by the rectum's blood vessels.

A study shows that awareness of rectal administration as a possible route of administration varies greatly among users of different drugs. The knowledge of rectal administration is highest among groups of users of alcohol, stimulants and opioids, where over 30% of users are aware of it.

The reasons for rectal administration are largely the same as with medicinal drugs: Bypassing the first-pass effect, fast onset, and a relatively high bioavailability with some drugs.

Rectal administration is sometimes thought of as a safer alternative to intravenous injection of psychoactive substances, which carries a significant risk of infections and illnesses like pulmonary granulomatosis.

However, rectal administration of psychoactive drugs has risks associated with it also. The combination of a brief acting time (compared to oral administration) and an unpredictable absorption-rate can, particularly for new users, result in a risk of overdoses. Use of shared or non-sterile equipment can increase the risk of acquiring sexually transmitted infections. Some psychoactive substances like substituted amphetamines can induce a strong vasoconstriction in the rectal vasculature and lead to intestinal ischemia.

As with illicit psychoactive drugs in general, risks connected to rectal administration stem from the often unknown purity and composition of the drugs. This leads to the user not knowing if and what substances, by-products or cutting agents are present in their drugs before administering them rectally. Possible impurities or falsely marketed substances greatly increase the risk of administering illicit drugs rectally.

== Mechanism and effects ==
A drug that is administered rectally will in general (depending on the drug) have a faster onset, higher bioavailability, shorter peak, and shorter duration than oral administration. Another advantage of administering a drug rectally is that it tends to produce less nausea compared to the oral route and prevents any amount of the drug from being lost due to emesis (vomiting). In addition, the rectal route bypasses around two-thirds of the first-pass metabolism as the rectum's venous drainage is two-thirds systemic (middle and inferior rectal vein) and one-third hepatic portal system (superior rectal vein). This means the drug will reach the circulatory system with significantly less alteration and in greater concentrations. (Note: Other ROAs that bypass first-pass metabolism include inhalation (smoking, vaporizing, etc.), intravenous injection (IV), insufflation ("snorting"), et cetera, but the oral route does not bypass first-pass metabolism.)

== Methods ==
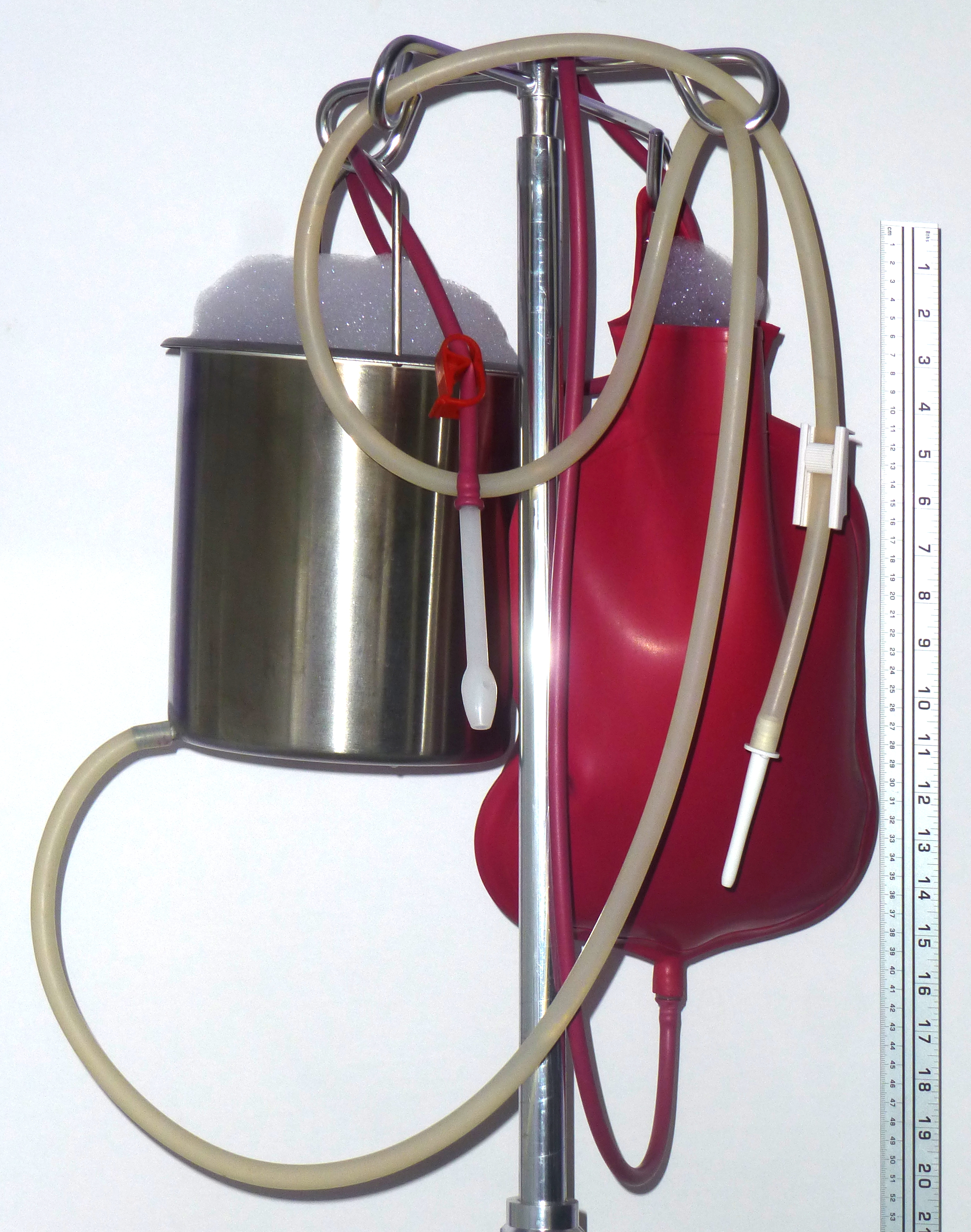
Enema equipment for introducing a large amount of fluid into the colon via the rectum.

Rectal administration of medication may be performed with any of the following:

- A suppository, a solid drug delivery system inserted into the rectum, where it dissolves or melts to exert local or systemic effects.
- A micro-enema, a small amount (usually less than 10 millilitres) of a liquid-drug solution injected into the rectum.
- A large volume enema to inject liquid into the colon either to cleanse feces from as much of the colon as possible or to deliver a drug solution.
- A specialized catheter designed for rectal administration of medications and liquids, that can be placed safely and remain comfortably in the rectum for repeated use.

== See also ==
- Enema
- Rectal discharge
- Routes of administration
- Suppository
