= Daughter from California syndrome =

Medical slang in palliative care

"Daughter from California" syndrome is a phrase used in the American medical profession to describe a situation in which a hitherto disengaged relative challenges the care a dying elderly patient is being given, or insists that the medical team pursue aggressive measures to prolong the patient's life. In California, the "Daughter from California" is known as the "Daughter from New York"; the "Daughter from Ontario" is a Canadian variant. The "Daughter from California" is often described as angry, articulate, and uninformed.

The phrase was first documented by a collective of gerontologists in a 1991 case report published in the Journal of the American Geriatrics Society, titled "Decision Making in the Incompetent Elderly: 'The Daughter from California Syndrome'". In the paper, David Molloy and colleagues presented strategies intended to help medical staff deal with the difficult family members of mentally incompetent patients.

Medical professionals say that because the "Daughter from California" has been absent from the life and care of the elderly patient, they are frequently surprised by the scale of the patient's deterioration, and may have unrealistic expectations about what is medically feasible. They may feel guilty about having been absent, and may therefore feel motivated to reassert their role as an involved caregiver. In his 2015 book The Conversation: A Revolutionary Plan for End-of-Life Care, American physician Angelo Volandes ascribes this to "guilt and denial" rather than "necessarily what is best for the patient".
