= Holly Witteman =

Health informatics researcher

Holly Witteman is a health informatics researcher. She is a Full Professor (professeure titulaire) in the Department of Family & Emergency Medicine at the Université Laval, in Quebec City, Canada. Witteman is the Canada Research Chair (Tier 2) in Human-Centred Digital Health (Santé numérique axée sur les personnes).

== Research career ==
Witteman's research explores person-centred digital health, with a focus on human-computer interaction in health education, risk communication and decision making. She previously completed a PhD in human factors engineering at the University of Toronto, where she was a fellow in Health Care, Technology, and Place, and was a post-doctoral research fellow at the Center for Bioethics and Social Science in Medicine at the University of Michigan.

In 2019, Witteman led a study, published in The Lancet, which found that when grant reviewers at the Canadian Institutes of Health Research primarily assessed the applicant as a scientist (rather than their proposed research), there were significant differences in success between male (13.9% success) and female (9.2%) principal investigators. In a later study, Witteman found that when the Canadian Institutes of Health Research implemented data-driven gender policy interventions in a second COVID-19 funding competition (April-May 2020), the funding competition received more grant applications from female scientists, and received and funded more grant applications which considered sex and gender in their study design.

In June 2020, Witteman received a Canadian Institutes of Health Research grant ($311,296) to investigate how Canadians perceive COVID-19 risk-reduction messages (such as the two-meter rule), and create digital health materials, such as videos and web applications, to help people better understand the science about COVID-19.

Witteman has published over 150 academic publications, which have been cited over 3,800 times, resulting in an h-index and i10-index of 30 and 67 respectively. She has spoken about different aspects of academia and the COVID-19 pandemic for various media outlets, including gender bias in academic grant applications, ableism, vaccine hesitancy, and the confusing COVID-19 vaccine roll-out for people with chronic health conditions in Quebec. Witteman has previously co-authored an open letter calling for the Canadian Common CV (CCV) to be abandoned, which was signed by over 2,000 CCV users.

== Personal life ==
Witteman has two children, and has been living with a chronic condition since 1983 (Type I Diabetes).

== Selected academic publications ==
- Shared decision making: examining key elements and barriers to adoption into routine clinical practice. France Légaré, Holly O Witteman. Health Affairs. 2013.
- "You get reminded you're a sick person": personal data tracking and patients with multiple chronic conditions. Jessica S Ancker, Holly O Witteman, Baria Hafeez, Thierry Provencher, Mary Van de Graaf, Esther Wei. Journal of Medical Internet Research. 2015.
- A three-talk model for shared decision making: multistage consultation process. Glyn Elwyn, Marie Anne Durand, Julia Song, Johanna Aarts, Paul J Barr, Zackary Berger, Nan Cochran, Dominick Frosch, Dariusz Galasiński, Pål Gulbrandsen, Paul KJ Han, Martin Härter, Paul Kinnersley, Amy Lloyd, Manish Mishra, Lilisbeth Perestelo-Perez, Isabelle Scholl, Kounosuke Tomori, Lyndal Trevena, Holly O Witteman, Trudy Van der Weijden. The BMJ. 2017.
- Are gender gaps due to evaluations of the applicant or the science? A natural experiment at a national funding agency. Holly O Witteman, Michael Hendricks, Sharon Straus, Cara Tannenbaum. The Lancet. 2019.
- COVID-19 gender policy changes support female scientists and improve research quality. Holly O. Witteman, Jenna Haverfield, and Cara Tannenbaum. Proceedings of the National Academy of Sciences. 2021.
