= International Journal of Palliative Nursing =

- Discipline: Palliative care
- Language: English
- Edited by: Brian Nyatanga

Publication details
- History: 1995–present
- Publisher: Mark Allen Group
- Frequency: Monthly

Standard abbreviations
- ISO 4: Int. J. Palliat. Nurs.

Indexing
- ISSN: 1357-6321 (print); 2052-286X (web)
- OCLC no.: 300303750

Links
- Journal homepage; Online access; Online archive

The International Journal of Palliative Nursing is a monthly peer-reviewed medical journal covering palliative care nursing. It was established in 1995 and is published by the Mark Allen Group. The editor-in-chief is Brian Nyatanga (of the University of Worcester). The journal is abstracted and indexed in CINAHL, Emerging Sources Citation Index, MEDLINE/PubMed, and Scopus.
