= Macy Catheter =

Medical tool for rectal drug administration

The Macy Catheter is a specialized catheter designed to provide comfortable and discreet administration of ongoing medications via the rectal route. The catheter was developed to make rectal access more practical and provide a way to deliver and retain liquid formulations in the distal rectum so that health practitioners can leverage the established benefits of rectal administration. Patients often need medication when the oral route is compromised, and the Macy Catheter provides an alternative for those medications that can be prescribed per rectum. The Macy Catheter is of particular relevance during the end of life, when it can help patients to remain comfortable in their home.

== Key features and functions ==
The Macy Catheter is a disposable device approved by the U.S. Food and Drug Administration (FDA), consisting of a dual-porl-lumen ballooned tube that is inserted by a clinician into the rectum just past the rectal sphincter. Once inserted into the rectum, a soft balloon is inflated with water via a balloon inflation valve to hold the device in place. This small, flexible "semi-retention" balloon exerts very little pressure on the rectal wall, and is designed for safety and comfort, while also allowing the catheter to be easily expelled when the patient needs to defecate. The catheter utilizes a small flexible silicone shaft, allowing the device to be placed safely and remain comfortably in the rectum for repeated administration of medications or liquids.

Once in place, the medication delivery port of the Macy Catheter rests on the patient's leg or abdomen, where it is easily accessible for repeated administration of liquid medications in solution or suspension form. The device stays in place until the patient has a bowel movement and expels the retention balloon, or until manually removed after first deflating the balloon.

The Macy Catheter medication port has a specialized valve to prevent leakage and is designed to be non-clogging and compatible only with the connectors on oral/enteral syringes (not luer syringes) for safety. The device is FDA-approved to remain in the rectum for up to 28 days. The catheter has a small lumen, allowing for small flush volumes to get medication to the rectum. Small volumes of medications (under 15ml) improve comfort by not stimulating the defecation response of the rectum, and can increase the overall absorption of a given dose by decreasing pooling of medication and migration of medication into more proximal areas of the rectum where absorption can be less effective.

== Indications for use ==
The Macy Catheter is intended to provide rectal access to administer liquids and medications. The Macy Catheter can be used in the following clinical situations:

1. Medication administration when the oral route fails
2. Administration of fluids and electrolytes
3. Administration of retention enemas

== Common clinical use scenarios ==
The Macy Catheter provides an immediate way to administer medication or liquids for patients in the home setting when the oral route of medication administration is compromised. Unlike intravenous lines, which usually need to be placed in an inpatient environment and require special formulation of sterile medications, the Macy Catheter can be placed by a clinician, such as a hospice nurse or home health nurse in the home. Many oral forms of medications can be crushed and suspended in water to be given via the Macy Catheter. The Macy Catheter is useful for patients who cannot swallow, including those near the end of life (an estimated 1.65 million people are in hospice care in the US each year). Because the Macy Catheter enables a rapid, safe, and lower cost alternative to administration of medications, it may also be applicable to care of patients in long-term care or palliative care, or as an alternative to intravenous or subcutaneous medication delivery in some instances.

The Macy Catheter is clinically indicated for the following scenarios:

1. Symptom management at the end of life, including but not limited to:

- Pain
- Agitation
- Dyspnea, or shortness of breath
- Nausea and vomiting
- Seizures
- Fever

2. Bowel obstruction

- For medication management, hydration, and symptom control when the oral route is not viable due to total obstruction

3. Discharge from acute care to the home setting

- Allows for easy, discreet, and safe medication administration and short-term hydration in the home setting
- For transitioning from intravenous or subcutaneous route to the rectal route when discharged from acute settings to the home setting

== History ==
The Macy Catheter was invented by Brad Macy, RN, BSN, a 22-year veteran hospice nurse. Inspired by a patient who was terminally agitated and not responding to a solid form of a rectally delivered medication, Macy administered the same medication in a liquid suspension with a small tube inserted into the patient's rectum. The patient's agitation rapidly diminished, and the patient was sleeping within 30 minutes. After practicing repeated successful interventions involving the application of medication in highly concentrated form to the distal one-third of the rectum, Macy realized the potential implications for hospice and palliative patients worldwide. With this motivation, he proceeded to develop the Macy Catheter, a device designed and developed for commercial use. The commercial product is protected by two issued U.S. patents and received 510(k) clearance from the Food and Drug Administration in early 2014.

== Rectal drug delivery ==
Rectal drug delivery is an effective route of medication delivery for many medications used at the end of life. The walls of the rectum absorb many medications quickly and effectively. Medications delivered to the distal one-third of the rectum at least partially avoid the "first pass effect" through the liver, which allows for greater bio-availability of many medications than that of the oral route.

The rectal route of administration is highly effective as the rectal mucosa is highly vascularized tissue that allows for rapid and effective absorption of medications. Although intravenous administration is the most commonly used alternate route in acute care settings, it is rarely used in hospice care, given the associated cost and need for a high level of care and training for providers. It can also lead to complications such as infection and pain. Although subcutaneous medication delivery is more common in hospice, it is also expensive and can cause infection, pain and swelling. The rectal route of administration is highly effective as the rectal mucosa is highly vascularized tissue that allows for rapid and effective absorption of medications. The Macy Catheter provides a solution to overcome the challenges and leverage the benefits of rectal administration.
