= Journal of Palliative Medicine =

- Discipline: Palliative medicine
- Language: English
- Edited by: Charles F. von Gunten

Publication details
- History: 1998 onward
- Publisher: Mary Ann Liebert (United States)
- Frequency: Monthly
- Open access: Open Option
- Impact factor: 2.490 (2017)

Standard abbreviations
- ISO 4: J. Palliat. Med.

Indexing
- ISSN: 1096-6218 (print); 1557-7740 (web)

Links
- Journal homepage; Center to Advance Palliative Care; Hospice and Palliative Nurses Association

The Journal of Palliative Medicine (JPM) is the journal of both the Center to Advance Palliative Care and the Hospice and Palliative Nurses Association. JPM covers aspects of end of life medical care.

Until 2008, JPM was the official journal of the American Association of Hospice and Palliative Medicine.
