= Clinical pathway =

Systemised approach to medical treatment

A clinical pathway, also known as care pathway, integrated care pathway, critical pathway, or care map, is one of the main tools used to manage the quality in healthcare concerning the standardisation of care processes. It has been shown that their implementation reduces the variability in clinical practice and improves outcomes. Clinical pathways aim to promote organised and efficient patient care based on evidence-based medicine, and aim to optimise outcomes in settings such as acute care and home care. A single clinical pathway may refer to multiple clinical guidelines on several topics in a well specified context.

== Definition ==
A clinical pathway is a multidisciplinary management tool based on evidence-based practice for a specific group of patients with a predictable clinical course, in which the different tasks (interventions) by the professionals involved in the patient care are defined, optimized and sequenced either by hour (ED), day (acute care) or visit (homecare). Outcomes are tied to specific interventions.

The concept of clinical pathways may have different meanings to different stakeholders. Managed care organizations often view clinical pathways in a similar way as they view care plans, in which the care provided to a patient is definitive and deliberate. Clinical pathways can range in scope from simple medication utilization to a comprehensive treatment plan. Clinical pathways aim for greater standardization of treatment regimens and sequencing as well as improved outcomes, from both a quality of life and a clinical outcomes perspective.

== History ==
The clinical pathway concept appeared for the first time at the New England Medical Center (Boston, United States) in 1985, inspired by Karen Zander and Kathleen Bower. Clinical pathways appeared as a result of the adaptation of the documents used in industrial quality management, the standard operating procedures (SOPs), whose goals are:

- Improve efficiency in the use of resources.
- Finish work in a set time.

== Characteristics ==
Clinical pathways (integrated care pathways) can be seen as an application of process management thinking to the improvement of patient healthcare. An aim is to re-center the focus on the patient's overall journey, rather than the contribution of each specialty or caring function independently. Instead, all are emphasised to be working together, in the same way as a cross-functional team.

More than just a guideline or a protocol, a care pathway is typically recorded in a single all-encompassing bedside document that will stand as an indicator of the care a patient is likely to be provided in the course of the pathway going forward; and ultimately as a single unified legal record of the care the patient has received, and the progress of their condition, as the pathway has been undertaken.

The pathway design tries to capture the foreseeable actions which will most commonly represent best practice for most patients most of the time, and include prompts for them at the appropriate time in the pathway document to ascertain whether they have been carried out, and whether results have been as expected. In this way results are recorded, and important questions and actions are not overlooked. However, pathways are typically not prescriptive; the patient's journey is an individual one, and an important part of the purpose of the pathway documents is to capture information on "variances", where due to circumstances or clinical judgment different actions have been taken, or different results unfolded. The combined variances for a sufficiently large population of patients are then analysed to identify important or systematic features, which can be used to improve the next iteration of the pathway.

== Selection criteria ==
The following signals may indicate that it may be useful to commit resources to establish and implement a clinical pathway for a particular condition:

- Prevalent pathology within the care setting
- Pathology with a significant risk for patients
- Pathology with a high cost for the hospital
- Predictable clinical course
- Pathology well defined and that permits homogeneous care
- Existence of recommendations of good practices or experts opinions
- Unexplained variability of care
- Possibility of obtaining professional agreement
- Multidisciplinary implementation
- Motivation by professionals to work on a specific condition

== Examples ==
- Liverpool Care Pathway for the Dying Patient

== See also ==
- Clinical formulation
- European Pathway Association
- Health economics
- Medical case management
- Nursing care plan
