= Patient navigators =

Patient navigators are supportive staff within healthcare, welfare, and community-based health systems. The position may collaborate closely, or have overlapping roles, with community health workers, case managers, and patient advocates.

Within Western countries, including the United States of America and the United Kingdom, the role of patient navigators is commonly recognized in societal and legal contexts. However, the training, credentials, and scope of practice for patent navigators are not yet standardized compared to traditional staff in health and social services. Commonly, the two main types of navigators are lay persons, such as volunteers, and professionals, such as nurses and social workers.

Patient navigators typically serve populations who are vulnerable to health disparities and underserved by their healthcare and welfare systems due to their ethnicity, socioeconomic, disability, or citizenship status. Patient navigators thus respond to discriminatory barriers and gaps in care that discourage crucial life-saving treatment, improving the quality of life and rates of survivorship for various medical conditions amongst these populations.

== History ==
The concept of patient navigators in the United States can be traced to the American Cancer Society's 1989 "National Hearings on Cancer in the Poor." The conference discussed a broad range of barriers that could discourage patients from accessing timely and effective oncological care, prompting the idea of having a designated member of the healthcare team responsible for assisting patients through every step of their cancer journeys.

In 1990, the first patient navigator program emerged from a partnership between the American Cancer Society and Dr. Harold Freeman. The program was implemented at the Harlem Hospital Center to primarily address the late-stage diagnoses and high mortality rates of breast cancer for low-income Black women. The pilot program became successful, increasing a significant increase in the Harlem patients' five-year breast cancer survival rate from 39% to 70%. These positive outcomes led the American Cancer Society to fund the development of other navigator programs that followed Freeman's model.

Freeman's model proposed that patient navigators should address the causes of health disparities that impact patients at any or all stages in oncology care, from detection to survivorship or end-of-life. Freeman argued that patient navigators were particularly vital during the "discovery-delivery disconnect" of when vulnerable patients obtain cancer diagnoses but cannot follow through with the proper course of treatment.

== Role of government ==
U.S. governmental sources of funding for patient navigator programs have varied throughout the years. In 2005, the Bush Administration enacted the Patient Navigation and Chronic Disease Prevention Act, the first American legislation to recognize patient navigators. The Act allowed federal funding of 20 patient navigator programs that served patients with various chronic medical conditions. Between 2016 and 2022, the Oncology Care Model by the Centers for Medicare and Medicaid Services financially incentivized "122 practices and 5 commercial payers" to improve the quality and coordination of care for Medicare patients, including through patient navigation.

In November 2023, the Centers for Medicare and Medicaid Services ruled on the financial reimbursement options for supportive workers, including patient navigators. The ruling became effective in January 2024. The billing codes for reimbursement require that the patients served by patient navigators must possess any "serious, high-risk disease" that necessitates continuous supervision for a minimum of three months, such as cancer or HIV. The monetary rates of each billing code vary depending on the services provided. The training and credentials necessary to receive reimbursement as a supportive worker depend upon requirements set at the state level.

=== Funding from the 2010 Affordable Care Act ===
The 2010 Patient Protection and Affordable Care Act (ACA) further incorporated patient navigators into the healthcare system by requiring Health Insurance Markets, or Exchanges, to develop and fund patient navigator programs. In this context, patient navigators were responsible for educating and assisting United States citizens in enrolling in health benefit plans. Under the ACA, patient navigators are also called "insurance navigators" or "in-person assisters."

The primary role of patient navigators, as defined in section 1311 of the ACA, is to educate the public on information about health care plans, facilitate enrollment into health plans, and provide information for tax credits and cost-sharing reductions. The education and information provided by patient navigators must be culturally and linguistically appropriate and provided in a fair and impartial manner. Patient navigators must meet standards and core proficiencies established by the Secretary of Health and Human Services.

==== Conflict-of-interest rules ====
As of 2014, the Centers for Medicare and Medicaid Services (CMS) require patient navigators seeking to facilitate public enrollment in plans to disclose information that may result in a conflict of interest to exchanges and consumers. Potential conflicts of interest include:

- Lines of insurance that a navigator intends to sell.
- Existing or former employment relationships within 5 years with an issuer of health or Stop loss policy (insurance).
- Existing employment relationship between an individual's spouse or domestic partner and any issuer of health or stop-loss insurance.
- Existing or anticipated financial, business, or contractual relationships with any issuer of health or stop-loss insurance.

If a patient navigator has a conflict of interest, they must provide a plan for mitigating these conflicts. Failure to submit a mitigation plan results in the inability to serve as a patient navigator and promote ACA health plan benefits.

==== Training requirements ====
As of 2014, training programs for patient navigators must be approved by the U.S. Department of Health and Human Services (HHS). The Medicare Learning Network is the primary source of HHS-approved training materials. State Exchanges may develop their own training programs, but they must also be approved by HHS. Training standards are outlined by the Centers for Medicare and Medicaid Services.

==== Certification requirements ====
As of 2014, the ACA requires patient navigators and patient navigator programs to be certified by the Federally-Facilitated Exchange or State Partnership Exchange through which they are funded. Certification is provided after completing a training program approved by the U.S. Department of Health and Human Services (HHS). Certification entails thirty hours of training, passing an HHS-approved certification test, and having the ability to provide culturally and linguistically appropriate services to individual and small business exchanges.

Continuing education and refresher training are also required to ensure patient navigators maintain appropriate training and fulfill recertification requirements on at least an annual basis.

==== Funding ====
Section 1311(i) of the ACA requires that each exchange develop a grant program to fund patient navigators and patient navigator programs that facilitate education and enrollment in qualified health plans. There are two primary funding sources for in-person outreach, education, and assistance for enrolling in exchange health plans.

In April 2013, the CMS announced a cooperative agreement to support patient navigators in Federally-Facilitated Exchanges (FFEs) or State-Partnership Exchanges (SPEs). Up to $54 million from Prevention and Public Health Funds were initially set aside for funding patient navigators in all 34 states. Apportionment of funds was calculated based on the number of uninsured and non-elderly legal residents living in each state with an FFE or SPE divided by the total number of uninsured, non-elderly residents in all states with FFEs or SPEs. A minimum of $600,000 was available to all FFEs or SPEs to support patient navigator programs.

In August 2013, HHS announced $67 million in grants to 105 groups that applied to provide patient navigation in FFEs or SPEs. An additional $13 million was transferred from the Prevention and Public Health Funds to boost the original $54 million dedicated by the CMS in April 2013, as previously discussed in the paragraph above. Patient navigator grantees included healthcare organizations and networks, non-profit organizations, universities, Indian tribes, faith-based institutions, and food banks.

==== Political criticism and debates ====
A September 2013 Congressional Research Service reported key issues related to navigator and non-navigator funding. Some lawmakers questioned the HHS' authority to transfer Prevention and Public Health Funds to fund patient navigators.

Furthermore, as of 2013, certain state governments and Congress members demand more oversight of patient navigators and programs to protect consumers' privacy. Opponents claim that passing laws to regulate patient navigators and programs can hinder the implementation of the ACA. As of September 2013, twelve states have required patient navigators to obtain either a state license or certification, and eight states have restricted the types of advice that patient navigators are allowed to offer to consumers.
