= Drugs & Aging =

- Discipline: Drug therapy, pharmacology
- Language: English
- Edited by: Caroline Herdson

Publication details
- History: 1991–present
- Publisher: Adis International (Springer Nature)
- Frequency: Monthly
- Open access: Hybrid
- Impact factor: 3.8 (2024)

Standard abbreviations
- ISO 4: Drugs Aging

Indexing
- CODEN: DRAGE6
- ISSN: 1170-229X (print); 1179-1969 (web)
- LCCN: 91650982
- OCLC no.: 37663941

Links
- Journal homepage; Online archive

Drugs & Aging is a monthly peer-reviewed medical journal published by Springer Nature under their Adis International imprint. It contains primarily review articles covering optimum use of drug therapies in older adults.

== Abstracting and indexing ==
The journal is abstracted and indexed in:

- BIOSIS Previews
- Chemical Abstracts Service
- CINAHL
- Current Contents/Clinical Medicine
- Current Contents/Life Sciences
- Embase
- MEDLINE
- Neuroscience Citation Index
- PASCAL
- PsycINFO
- Science Citation Index
- Scopus

According to the Journal Citation Reports, the journal has a 2024 impact factor of 3.8.
