= End-of-life care =

Health care for a person nearing the end of their life

End-of-life care is health care provided in the time leading up to a person's death. End-of-life care can be provided in the hours, days, or months before a person dies and encompasses care and support for a person's mental and emotional needs, physical comfort, spiritual needs, and practical tasks.

End-of-life care is most commonly provided at home, in a hospital, or in a long-term care facility with care being provided by family members, nurses, social workers, physicians, and other support staff. Facilities may also have palliative or hospice care teams that will provide end-of-life care services. Decisions about end-of-life care are often informed by medical, financial and ethical considerations.

In most developed countries, medical spending on people in the last twelve months of life makes up roughly 10% of total aggregate medical spending, while those in the last three years of life can cost up to 25%.

== Medical ==
=== Advanced care planning ===
Advances in medical care since the mid-20th century have expanded the options available to extend life and highlighted the importance of ensuring that an individual's preferences and values for end-of-life care are honored. Advanced care planning is the process by which a person of any age is able to provide their preferences and ensure that their future medical treatment aligns with their personal values and life goals. It is typically a process, with ongoing discussions about a patient's prognosis and conditions and conversations about medical dilemmas and options. A person will typically have these conversations with their healthcare providers and ultimately record their preferences in an advance healthcare directive. An advance healthcare directive is a legal document that either documents a person's decisions about desired treatment or indicates who a person has entrusted to make their care decisions for them. The two main types of advance directives are a living will and durable power of attorney for healthcare. A living will includes a person's decisions regarding their future care, most of which addresses resuscitation and life support. Still, it may also cover their preferences regarding hospitalization, pain management, and specific treatments available. A living will typically takes effect when a person is terminally ill with a low probability of recovery. A durable power of attorney for healthcare allows a person to appoint another individual to make healthcare decisions for them under a specified set of circumstances. Combined directives—such as the "Five Wishes"—that include components of both the living will, and durable power of attorney for healthcare are increasingly utilized.

Advanced care planning often includes preferences for CPR initiation, nutrition (e.g., tube feeding), as well as decisions about the use of machines to keep a person breathing or support their heart or kidneys. Advance care planning can be a complex and intimidating change for ailing persons. Often, when the person must make a significant change, they will undergo five stages of change: precontemplation, contemplation, preparation, action, and maintenance. Many studies have reported benefits to persons who complete advanced care planning, specifically noting improved individual and surrogate satisfaction with communication and decreased clinician distress. However, there is a notable lack of empirical data about the outcome improvements people experience, as there are considerable discrepancies in what constitutes advanced care planning and heterogeneity in the outcomes measured. Advance care planning remains an underutilized option tool. Researchers have published data to support the use of new relationship-based and supported decision-making models that can increase the use and maximize the benefit of advance care planning.

=== End-of-life care conversations ===
End-of-life care conversations are part of the treatment planning process for terminally ill individuals requiring palliative care, involving a discussion of an individual's prognosis, specification of care goals, and individualized treatment planning. A 2022 Cochrane review examined the effectiveness of interpersonal communication interventions in end-of-life care. There is evidence that individuals prioritize proper symptom management, avoidance of suffering, and care that aligns with ethical and cultural standards. Specific conversations can include discussions about cardiopulmonary resuscitation (ideally occurring before the active dying phase as to not force the conversation during a medical crisis/emergency), place of death, organ donation, and cultural/religious traditions. As there are many factors involved in the end-of-life care decision-making process, the attitudes and perspectives of dying individuals and families may vary. For example, family members may differ over whether life extension or life quality is the primary goal of treatment. As it can be challenging for families in the grieving process to make timely decisions that respect the patient's wishes and values, having an established advanced care directive in place can prevent over-treatment, under-treatment, or further complications in treatment management.

Shared decision-making (SDM) is crucial to end-of-life care conversations between patients, families, and providers. SDM allows patients and providers to collaborate on their treatment plans and efforts to ensure the patient's voice is heard. This model fosters a collaborative conversation between healthcare providers and patients that focuses on the patient's goals and beliefs, with the provider's expertise and medical knowledge to formulate a co-developed care plan. For instance, a terminally ill patient may prioritize quality of life and seek to formulate an effective plan with their trusted provider.

Patients and families may also struggle to grasp the inevitability of death and the differing risks and effects of medical and non-medical interventions available for end-of-life care. People might avoid discussing their end-of-life care, and often, the timing and quality of these discussions can be poor. For example, conversations regarding end-of-life care between chronic obstructive pulmonary disease (COPD) patients and clinicians often occur when the person with COPD has advanced-stage disease, if at all. To prevent interventions that are not in accordance with the patient's wishes, end-of-life care conversations and advanced care directives can allow for the care they desire, as well as help prevent confusion and strain for family members. Applying SDM aids in making sure patients and providers are on the same page about the patient's plans and goals to promote mutual respect and communication. It ensures that all parties involved have their needs and wishes met and respected.

In the case of critically ill babies, parents can participate more in decision-making if they are presented with options to be discussed rather than recommendations by the doctor. Utilizing this communication style also leads to less conflict with doctors and might help the parents cope better with the eventual outcomes.

=== Signs of dying ===
The National Cancer Institute in the United States advises that the presence of some of the following signs may indicate that death is approaching:

- Drowsiness, increased sleep, and/or unresponsiveness (caused by changes in the patient's metabolism).
- Confusion about time, place, and/or identity of loved ones; restlessness; visions of people and places that are not present; pulling at bed linen or clothing (caused partly by changes in the patient's metabolism).
- Decreased socialization and increased withdrawal (caused by decreased oxygen to the brain, reduced blood flow, and mental preparation for dying).
- Changes in breathing (indicating neurologic compromise and impending death) and accumulation of upper airway secretions (resulting in crackling and gurgling breath sounds).
- Decreased demand for food and fluids, and loss of appetite (caused by the body's need to conserve energy and decreased ability to use food and fluids properly).
- Decreased oral intake and impaired swallowing (caused by general physical weakness and metabolic disturbances, including but not limited to hypercalcemia).
- Loss of bladder or bowel control (caused by the relaxation of muscles in the pelvic area).
- Darkened urine or decreased amount of urine (caused by slowing of kidney function and/or decreased fluid intake).
- Skin becoming cool to the touch, particularly the hands and feet; skin may become bluish in color, especially on the underside of the body (caused by decreased circulation to the extremities).
- Rattling or gurgling sounds while breathing, which may be loud (i.e., the death rattle); breathing that is irregular and shallow; decreased number of breaths per minute; breathing that alternates between rapid and slow (caused by congestion from decreased fluid consumption, a buildup of waste products in the body, and/or a decrease in circulation to the organs).
- Turning of the head toward a light source (caused by decreasing vision).
- Increased difficulty controlling pain (caused by progression of disease).
- Involuntary movements (called myoclonus).
- Increased heart rate.
- Hypertension followed by hypotension.
- Loss of reflexes in the legs and arms.

=== Symptom management ===
The following are some of the most common potential problems that can arise in the last days and hours of a person's life:

Pain
Typically controlled with opioids like morphine, fentanyl, hydromorphone or, in the United Kingdom, diamorphine. High doses of opioids can cause respiratory depression, and this risk increases with concomitant use of alcohol and other sedatives. Careful use of opioids is important to maintaining patient quality of life while avoiding overdoses.
Agitation
Delirium, terminal anguish, restlessness (e.g., thrashing, plucking, or twitching). Typically controlled using clonazepam or midazolam, but antipsychotics like haloperidol or levomepromazine may also be used instead of or concomitantly with benzodiazepines. Symptoms may also sometimes be alleviated by rehydration, which may reduce the effects of some toxic drug metabolites.
Respiratory tract secretions
Saliva and other fluids can accumulate in the oropharynx and upper airways when patients become too weak to clear their throats, leading to a characteristic gurgling or rattle-like sound ("death rattle"). While not apparently distressing for the patient, the association of this symptom with impending death can create fear and uncertainty for those at the bedside. The secretions may be controlled using drugs such as hyoscine butylbromide, glycopyrronium, or atropine. Rattle may not be controllable if caused by deeper fluid accumulation in the bronchi or the lungs, such as occurs with pneumonia or some tumors.
Nausea and vomiting
Typically controlled using haloperidol, metoclopramide, ondansetron, cyclizine, or other anti-emetics. Sometimes levomepromazine is used as second-line to alleviate both agitation and of nausea and vomiting.
Dyspnea (breathlessness)
Patients become increasingly likely to experience breathlessness in the last days and weeks of their lives, which can be very distressing for both the patients themselves and their loved ones. This symptom is typically controlled with opioids, like morphine, fentanyl or, in the United Kingdom, diamorphine.

Constipation

Low food intake and opioid use can lead to constipation, which can then result in agitation, pain, and delirium. Laxatives and stool softeners are used to prevent constipation. In patients with constipation, the dose of laxatives will be increased to relieve symptoms. Methylnaltrexone is approved to treat constipation due to opioid use.

Other symptoms that may occur, and may be mitigated to some extent, include cough, fatigue, fever, and in some cases bleeding.

=== Medication administration ===
A subcutaneous injection is one preferred route of delivery of medications when it has become difficult for patients to swallow or to take pills orally, and if repeated medication is needed, a syringe driver (or infusion pump in the US) is often likely to be used, to deliver a steady low dose of medication. In some settings, such as the home or hospice, sublingual routes of administration may be used for most prescriptions and medications.

Another means of medication delivery, available for use when the oral route is compromised, is a specialized catheter designed to provide comfortable and discreet administration of ongoing medications via the rectal route. The catheter was developed to make rectal access more practical and provide a way to deliver and retain liquid formulations in the distal rectum so that health practitioners can leverage the established benefits of rectal administration. Its small, flexible silicone shaft allows the device to be placed safely and remain comfortably in the rectum for repeated administration of medications or liquids. The catheter has a small lumen, allowing for small flush volumes to get medication to the rectum. Small volumes of medications (under 15mL) improve comfort by not stimulating the defecation response of the rectum and can increase the overall absorption of a given dose by decreasing pooling of medication and migration of medication into more proximal areas of the rectum where absorption can be less effective.

=== Integrated pathways ===
Integrated care pathways are an organizational tool used by healthcare professionals to clearly define the roles of each team member and coordinate how and when care will be provided. These pathways are utilized to ensure best practices for end-of-life care, such as evidence-based and accepted health care protocols, and to list the required care features for a specific diagnosis or clinical problem. Many institutions have a predetermined pathway for end-of-life care, and clinicians should be aware of and use these plans when possible. Integrated care pathways should also focus on standardizing healthcare processes while tailoring individual patient needs. For example, integrated pathways can be complex and promote a major change within the patient's lifestyle. In this case, it is essential to create a pathway that will allow an individual to maintain autonomy and their current lifestyle without making drastic changes. These factors can be evaluated from the Social Ecological Model. This model can be broken down into individual, interpersonal, organizational, community, and societal/ political factors. All of which can impact how an integrated pathway will be implemented.

In the United Kingdom, end-of-life care pathways are based on the Liverpool Care Pathway. Originally developed to provide evidence based care to dying cancer patients, this pathway has been adapted and used for a variety of chronic conditions at clinics in the UK and internationally. Despite its increasing popularity, the 2016 Cochrane Review, which only analyzed one trial, showed limited evidence in the form of high-quality randomized clinical trials to measure the effectiveness of end-of-life care pathways on clinical outcomes, physical outcomes, and emotional/psychological outcomes.

The BEACON Project group developed an integrated care pathway entitled the Comfort Care Order Set, which delineates care for the last days of life in either a hospice or acute care inpatient setting. This order set was implemented and evaluated in a multisite system throughout six United States Veterans Affairs Medical Centers, and the study found increased orders for opioid medication post-pathway implementation, as well as more orders for antipsychotic medications, more patients undergoing palliative care consultations, more advance directives, and increased sublingual drug administration. The intervention did not, however, decrease the proportion of deaths that occurred in an ICU setting or the utilization of restraints around death.

=== End-of-life care in oncology ===
In cancer contexts, palliative care is intended to promote quality of life for the patient rather than cure disease, and can be provided as early as the point of diagnosis. End-of-life care is typically provided to patients with a life expectancy of less than a year. Both care options target the comprehensive needs of patients, including the physical, emotional, social, and spiritual domains of suffering, with the goal of reducing suffering and improving quality of life.

One systematic review found that many patients lack adequate understanding of the goals of palliative care. Furthermore, the same review identified that clinicians may be hesitant to initiate conversations about prognosis in cases where outcomes are expected to be poor. Research shows that high-quality end-of-life care involves a treatment plan that is oriented around the patient and emphasizes symptom management, respect for end-of-life preferences, and providing emotional and spiritual support. Advance care planning and earlier end-of-life discussions between patient and clinician have been shown to promote quality of life and reduce the financial burden for the patient and their caregivers. One study advocates for the use of the biopsychosocial model when targeting pain as a symptom. In this model, the combination of medicinal and psychosocial interventions are utilized to better reduce suffering. Other models involve interdisciplinary oncology teams that include nurses, social workers, and home-based care administration. Additionally, they typically emphasize patient-clinician communication and psychosocial support, while also addressing the needs of both patient and primary caregiver.

Psychosocial treatments in cancer care consists of a variety of interventions that can be intended to help the patient with things like critical treatment decisions, reducing distress, contending with mortality, and improving overall mental and physical well-being. One review evaluated the ability of psychosocial interventions to reduce cancer-related fatigue (CRF), and found mindfulness and cognitive behavioral approaches to be among the most effective options evaluated. However, the review did not report any long-term impact from these therapies, and other research evaluating the benefits of psychosocial treatment on fatigue among adults with end-stage cancer who were receiving palliative care, found minor to no effects in fatigue-reduction among this population. Research looking at psychosocial interventions on post-traumatic growth (PTG), found cognitive behavioral therapy and mindfulness-based therapies to produce the most optimal PTG outcomes among adult cancer patients. For the caregivers of cancer patients, research suggests that psychosocial interventions may improve feelings of caregiver burden, although effects faded after the intervention. Beyond physical symptoms, psychosocial interventions show promise in improving feelings of meaning and purpose for cancer patients, although current research notes these improvements to be small to medium in effect size. Still, continued beliefs of meaning or purpose may help individuals cope with distress and support their overall quality of life. Research in cancer populations has shown that higher levels of meaning are linked to better psychological outcomes, including lower rates of depression, hopelessness, and anxiety, and have also been associated, to lesser extent, with improved physical well-being. Maintaining a sense of meaning and purpose is particularly relevant in end-of-life cancer care, where psychological distress is common.

Overall, end-of-life care in oncology involves a combination of symptom management, psychosocial support, communication about care and treatment goals, and attention to the needs of the patient and their family. Quality end-of-life care relies on coordination between care providers to best accommodate the different needs of each individual patient. Lastly, honoring the preferences of the patient is critical in ensuring that end-of-life care aligns with their values and priorities as they approach the final stage of their illness.

=== Home-based end-of-life care ===
While not possible for every person needing care, surveys of the general public suggest most people would prefer to die at home. From 2003 to 2017, the number of deaths at home in the United States increased from 23.8% to 30.7%, while the number of deaths in the hospital decreased from 39.7% to 29.8%. Home-based end-of-life care may be delivered in a number of ways, including by an extension of a primary care practice, by a palliative care practice, and by home care agencies such as Hospice. High-certainty evidence indicates that implementation of home-based end-of-life care programs increases the number of adults who will die at home and slightly improves their satisfaction at a one-month follow-up. There is low-certainty evidence that there may be very little or no difference in satisfaction of the person needing care for longer term (6 months). The number of people admitted to the hospital during an end-of-life care program is unknown. In addition, the impact of home-based end-of-life care on caregivers, healthcare staff, and health service costs is not clear. However, there is weak evidence to suggest that this intervention may reduce health care costs by a small amount.

=== Disparities in end-of-life care ===
Not all groups in society have good access to end-of-life care. A systematic review conducted in 2021 investigated the end-of-life care experiences of people with severe mental illness, including those with schizophrenia, bipolar disorder, and major depressive disorder. The research found that individuals with a severe mental illness were unlikely to receive the most appropriate end-of-life care. The review recommended that there needs to be close partnerships and communication between mental health and end-of-life care systems, and these teams need to find ways to support people to die where they choose. More training, support, and supervision need to be available for professionals working in end-of-life care; this could also decrease prejudice and stigma against individuals with severe mental illness at the end of life, notably in those who are homeless. In addition, studies have shown that minority patients face several additional barriers to receiving quality end-of-life care. Minority patients are prevented from accessing care at an equitable rate for a variety of reasons, including individual discrimination from caregivers, cultural insensitivity, racial economic disparities, as well as medical mistrust. Many individuals with minority sexual and gender identities also experience disparities throughout illness and end-of-life care. One meta-analysis conducted in 2023 reported that LGBTQ+ individuals are disproportionately at greater risk for health issues, and that heteronormative and cisnormative assumptions within healthcare settings can lead to psychosocial or identity-related needs being overlooked. Some LGBTQ+ patients reported feeling unsafe talking about their sexual and gender orientation. Fear of discrimination and limited social support resources can further reduce access to equitable end-of-life care for these population groups. Furthermore, these disparities can be understood through the Social Ecological Model. This model discusses how different factors, such as personal, environmental, political, and societal, influence a person's lifestyle. The model highlights how the different levels intersect and affect patients' ability to carry out their treatment plan.

== Non-medical ==
=== Family and friends ===
Family members are often uncertain as to what they should be doing when a person is dying. Many gentle, familiar daily tasks, such as combing hair, putting lotion on delicate skin, and holding hands, are comforting and provide a meaningful method of communicating love to a dying person.

Family members may be suffering emotionally due to the impending death. Their own fear of death may affect their behavior. They may feel guilty about past events in their relationship with the dying person or feel that they have been neglectful. These common emotions can result in tension, fights between family members over decisions, worsened care, and sometimes (in what medical professionals call the "Daughter from California syndrome") a long-absent family member arrives while a patient is dying to demand inappropriately aggressive care.

Family involvement in end-of-life care can be both beneficial and detrimental to patients, depending on the shape that involvement takes. On the one hand, family involvement is associated with reduced patient distress when the goals of the patient and the family are convergent. Loved ones can engage the patient in discussions about their care preferences, aid communication with the medical team, and offer social, emotional, and financial support. However, family involvement can also be detrimental when the goals of the patient and family are divergent. Emotionally charged decision-making and differing opinions on medical decisions like terminal sedation, withdrawing of treatment, and transitioning to hospice can lead to arguments, conflict, and poor communication. End-of-life decisions can be explained by the Theory of Reasoned Action (TRA), which balances personal values and the opinions and beliefs of family members. In the context of end-of-life cancer care, some key themes regarding familial conflict at the end-of-life include patients and family members being on different pages regarding the illness prognosis, familial strife, cultural differences, and the general stress that accompanies caregiving. In addition to these, family can be a major predictor of whether or not the person engages in the behavior, and all parties have a mutual understanding of the end-of-life care plan.

Research on patient and family preferences have elucidated some key findings. In intensive care units, good communication, coordination between different arms of the care team, and spiritual support were found to be important to both patients and their families. When patients receive subpar end-of-life care – like recurring emergency room visits, chemotherapy administered at the end-of-life, or failure to be admitted to hospice – the well-being of their loved ones can suffer. In cases where the patient did not receive appropriate end-of-life care, families and loved ones experienced more depression and regret than families and loved ones with patients who experienced appropriate end-of-life care.

In research done into shared decision-making (SDM) in regards to cancer patients receiving palliative care, it has been found that most patients rely on the physician to initiate some form of SDM, leading to family and friends being involved in the decision making process along with the patient and physician. However, this can also result in lapses of judgment, as physicians in these studies have typically showed intent to preserve a patient's "hope". This brings up a whole different case on whether or not it is physician's jobs to promote "hope", but obviously it seems like most do try to. Patients rely on their physician as an expert opinion, but in palliative care circumstances, the physician may want to involve the patient and their family more, since any medical interventions may be ineffective at that point. However, this again proves to be a slippery slope, as some patients facing existential uncertainty do not want a large part in the decision making process, instead defaulting to the previously mentioned expert opinion of doctors. Research has indicated many physicians are ill-equipped with communication skills and training to assist them in end-of-life discussions. The study suggests that SDM in regards to palliative cancer care is a challenging and constantly evolving situation, with it mostly revolving around the relationship between the patient, the patient's family, and the physicians in charge. Facilitating and building up the relationship between these parties is the best way to encourage positive SDM in palliative care cancer patients.

=== Spirituality and religion ===
Spirituality is thought to be of increased importance to an individual's wellbeing during a terminal illness or toward the end-of-life. For example, most cancer patients report some level of spirituality or religiosity, but nearly half report some degree of spiritual struggle at the end-of-life. Pastoral/spiritual care has a particular significance in end of life care, and is considered an essential part of palliative care by the WHO. In palliative care, responsibility for spiritual care is shared by the whole team, with leadership given by specialist practitioners such as pastoral care workers. The palliative care approach to spiritual care may, however, be transferred to other contexts and to individual practice.

Spiritual, cultural, and religious beliefs may influence or guide patient preferences regarding end-of-life care. Healthcare providers caring for patients at the end of life can engage family members and encourage conversations about spiritual practices to better address the different needs of diverse patient populations. Studies have shown that people who identify as religious also report higher levels of well-being. This leads to a higher level of self-efficacy and provides the person with the skills to make and execute decisions relating to end-of-life care. Evidence supports that people who practice religion tend to have a more positive outlook on life and can help patients deal with stress associated with growing older. On the other hand religion has also been shown to be inversely correlated with depression and suicide. While religion provides some benefits to patients, there is some evidence of increased anxiety and other negative outcomes in some studies. Religiosity, for example, has been associated with poorer advanced care planning. Additionally, while spirituality has been associated with less aggressive end-of-life care, religion has been associated with an increased desire for aggressive care in some patients. Despite these varied outcomes, spiritual and religious care remains an important aspect of care for patients. Studies have shown that barriers to providing adequate spiritual and religious care include a lack of cultural understanding, limited time, and a lack of formal training or experience.

There is nuance to the relationship between religiosity or spirituality and end-of-life care, because different trends emerge based on factors like religious denomination and geographical location. For example, Catholics are significantly less likely to have a do not resuscitate (DNR) order compared to non-Catholics. Compared to Christians, Buddhists and Taoists in Singapore are more likely to receive aggressive, life-prolonging care. At the same time, people belonging to a particular religious or ethnic group should not be treated as a monolith. Within these groups, beliefs and end-of-life care preferences can vary quite widely, highlighting the need for open-minded, adaptable, and culturally competent end-of-life care. In the Western world, many health care providers lack knowledge about culturally and spiritually informed end-of-life care and report discomfort when engaging in religious discussions with people whose beliefs differ from their own. This is one hypothesis as to why minorities access end-of-life care at lower rates than white people. At the same time, engagement with end-of-life care services can improve when clinicians are educated on culturally and spiritually diverse beliefs, which can foster better relationships and communication between health care providers, patients, and families. Currently, web-based educational programs that center stories, dialogue, and personal reflection are showing promise at improving cultural and spiritual competence amongst providers.

Many hospitals, nursing homes, and hospice centers have chaplains who provide spiritual support and grief counseling to patients and families of all religious and cultural backgrounds.

=== Ageism ===
The World Health Organization defines ageism as "the stereotypes (how we think), prejudice (how we feel) and discrimination (how we act) towards others or ourselves based on age." A systematic review in 2017 showed that negative attitudes amongst nurses towards older individuals were related to the characteristics of the older adults and their demands. This review also highlighted how nurses who had difficulty giving care to their older patients perceived them as "weak, disabled, inflexible, and lacking cognitive or mental ability". Another systematic review considering structural and individual-level effects of ageism found that ageism led to significantly worse health outcomes in 95.5% of the studies and 74.0% of the 1,159 ageism-health associations examined. Studies have also shown that one's own perception of aging and internalized ageism negatively impacts their health. In the same systematic review, they included this factor as part of their research. It was concluded that 93.4% of their total 142 associations about self-perceptions of aging show significant associations between ageism and worse health.

== Attitudes of healthcare professionals ==
End-of-life care is an interdisciplinary endeavor involving physicians, nurses, physical therapists, occupational therapists, pharmacists and social workers. Depending on the facility and level of care needed, the composition of the interprofessional team can vary. Health professional attitudes about end-of-life care depend in part on the provider's role in the care team.

Physicians generally have favorable attitudes towards Advance Directives, which are a key facet of end-of-life care. Medical doctors who have more experience and training in end-of-life care are more likely to cite comfort in having end-of-life-care discussions with patients. Those physicians who have more exposure to end-of-life care also have a higher likelihood of involving nurses in their decision-making process.

A systematic review assessing end-of-life conversations between heart failure patients and healthcare professionals evaluated physician attitudes and preferences towards end-of-life care conversations. The study found that physicians found difficulty initiating end-of-life conversations with their heart failure patients, due to physician apprehension over inducing anxiety in patients, the uncertainty in a patient's prognosis, and physicians awaiting patient cues to initiate end-of-life care conversations.

Although physicians make official decisions about end-of-life care, nurses spend more time with patients and often know more about patient desires and concerns. In a Dutch national survey study of attitudes of nursing staff about involvement in medical end-of-life decisions, 64% of respondents thought patients preferred talking with nurses than physicians and 75% desired to be involved in end-of-life decision making.

== Ethics ==
The ethics of end-of-life care revolve around dignity and respect for the patient by minimizing their suffering, enhancing their quality of life, and honoring any wishes or advance directives they may have put forth. In practice, however, these goals can be complicated by factors like patient competence, family influence, and the absence of advanced care planning. Decisions about CPR, intubation, tube feeding, terminal sedation, physician-assisted suicide, and the stopping of life-prolonging treatment can all present ethical dilemmas for doctors and caregivers as they try to strike a balance between prolonging a patient's life and preventing unnecessary pain. Four universal ethical principles can guide healthcare providers as they navigate difficult end-of-life care decisions:

- Autonomy: Respecting a person's right to make their own decisions. Patients are typically the best decision makers in their own lives. In the context of end-of-life care, however, autonomy is closely intertwined with advance directives like designated healthcare proxies, living wills, and do not resuscitate orders. If a patient loses the ability to make sound decisions at the end of their life, then all healthcare decisions should be made in accordance with their advance directives. In the absence of an advance directive, the decision-making power is transferred to the family. If the family is unable or unwilling to make these decisions, the responsibility falls on the patient's healthcare team.
- Beneficence: The ethical obligation to make decisions that are in the best interest of the patient. If no advance directive exists, both physicians and loved ones can be faced with the difficult task of determining what the patient would have wanted their end-of-life care to look like. If an individual is unable to make their own decisions at the end of their life, consultations between doctors and family members or healthcare proxies can help determine the best course of action. Emotions can run high when a loved one is dying, which can hinder the decision-making process for both doctors and family members.
- Nonmaleficence: Doing no harm. When it comes to end-of-life care, nonmaleficence generally means that the harm or pain caused by a medical intervention should not outweigh its benefit. The principle of double effect states that an action with both good effects and negative side effects can be performed ethically, as long as the negative side effect is not the goal and is not out of proportion to the intended positive outcome. For example, interventions like CPR and mechanical ventilation can be life-prolonging and even life-saving under the right circumstances – but they can also be painful and futile at the end of life. It is up to the physician, in consultation with the family, to weigh the risks and benefits of treatment and avoid putting the patient through needless suffering.
- Justice: The distribution of medical resources should be fair, equitable, and impartial. In the context of end-of-life care, this often requires providers to be knowledgeable about biases toward traditionally underserved groups and advocate appropriately on their behalf. Medical resources are limited and end-of-life interventions, in particular, can require a substantial investment of time and money. It is the responsibility of doctors and clinicians to ensure that finite resources are not being used to the benefit of one group over another. For example, a 2012 meta-analysis found differences in care – especially around the decision to withdraw treatment – based on factors like age and gender. Patients from vulnerable populations like women and the elderly were more likely to be the recipients of non-treatment decisions.

Confusion surrounding the difference between euthanasia and withdrawing or withholding treatment is a distinction that can be distressing for family members and doctors alike. For family members, the concern is often ethical and philosophical in nature: "If I stop life-prolonging care, am I killing my loved one?" For doctors, this concern can go one step further: "If I stop providing life-prolonging care, is that euthanasia?" In addition to the ethical implications, doctors can fear legal ramifications since physician assisted suicide must be a voluntary decision on the part of the patient and is only legal in specific places under specific circumstances. Not only can this conflict be unpleasant for doctors, it can also lead to poorer outcomes for patients. Thus, clear directives are needed to identify when it is acceptable to withdraw or withhold treatment at the end of life. One argument contends that there is no ethical distinction between stopping a life-prolonging medical intervention once it has begun, and refusing to start it all together. If the intervention is medically futile, contrary to the best interest of the patient, or unwanted by the patient (either in the moment or in an advance directive), then it is ethically acceptable to withdraw or withhold treatment.

== By country ==
=== Canada ===
In 2012, Statistics Canada's General Social Survey on Caregiving and care receiving found that 13% of Canadians (3.7 million) aged 15 and older reported that at some point in their lives they had provided end-of-life or palliative care to a family member or friend. For those in their 50s and 60s, the percentage was higher, with about 20% reporting having provided palliative care to a family member or friend. Women were also more likely to have provided palliative care over their lifetimes, with 16% of women reporting having done so, compared with 10% of men. These caregivers helped terminally ill family members or friends with personal or medical care, food preparation, managing finances or providing transportation to and from medical appointments.

=== United Kingdom ===
End of life care has been identified by the UK Department of Health as an area where quality of care has previously been "very variable," and which has not had a high profile in the NHS and social care. To address this, a national end of life care programme was established in 2004 to identify and propagate best practice, and a national strategy document published in 2008. The Scottish Government has also published a national strategy.

In 2006 just over half a million people died in England, about 99% of them adults over the age of 18, and almost two-thirds adults over the age of 75. About three-quarters of deaths could be considered "predictable" and followed a period of chronic illness – for example heart disease, cancer, stroke, or dementia. In all, 58% of deaths occurred in an NHS hospital, 18% at home, 17% in residential care homes (most commonly people over the age of 85), and about 4% in hospices. However, a majority of people would prefer to die at home or in a hospice, and according to one survey less than 5% would rather die in hospital. A key aim of the strategy therefore is to reduce the needs for dying patients to have to go to hospital and/or to have to stay there; and to improve provision for support and palliative care in the community to make this possible. One study estimated that 40% of the patients who had died in hospital had not had medical needs that required them to be there.

In 2015 and 2010, the UK ranked highest globally in a study of end-of-life care. The 2015 study said "Its ranking is due to comprehensive national policies, the extensive integration of palliative care into the National Health Service, a strong hospice movement, and deep community engagement on the issue." The studies were carried out by the Economist Intelligence Unit and commissioned by the Lien Foundation, a Singaporean philanthropic organisation.

The 2015 National Institute for Health and Care Excellence guidelines introduced religion and spirituality among the factors which physicians shall take into account for assessing palliative care needs. In 2016, the UK Minister of Health signed a document which declared people "should have access to personalised care which focuses on the preferences, beliefs and spiritual needs of the individual." As of 2017, more than 47% of the 500,000 deaths in the UK occurred in hospitals.

In 2021 the National Palliative and End of Life Care Partnership published their six ambitions for 2021–26. These include fair access to end of life care for everyone regardless of who they are, where they live or their circumstances, and the need to maximise comfort and wellbeing. Informed and timely conversations are also highlighted.

Research funded by the UK's National Institute for Health and Care Research (NIHR) has addressed these areas of need. Examples highlight inequalities faced by several groups and offers recommendations. These include the need for close partnership between services caring for people with severe mental illness, improved understanding of barriers faced by Gypsy, Traveller and Roma communities, the provision of flexible palliative care services for children from ethnic minorities or deprived areas.

Other research suggests that giving nurses and pharmacists easier access to electronic patient records about prescribing could help people manage their symptoms at home. A named professional to support and guide patients and carers through the healthcare system could also improve the experience of care at home at the end of life. A synthesised review looking at palliative care in the UK created a resource showing which services were available and grouped them according to their intended purpose and benefit to the patient. They also stated that currently in the UK palliative services are only available to patients with a timeline to death, usually 12 months or less. They found these timelines to often be inaccurate and created barriers to patients accessing appropriate services. They call for a more holistic approach to end of life care which is not restricted by arbitrary timelines.

=== United States ===
As of 2019, physician-assisted dying is legal in eight states (California, Colorado, Hawaii, Maine, New Jersey, Oregon, Vermont, Washington) and Washington D.C.

Spending on those in the last twelve months accounts for 8.5% of total aggregate medical spending in the United States.

When considering only those aged 65 and older, estimates show that about 27% of Medicare's annual $327 billion budget ($88 billion) in 2006 goes to care for patients in their final year of life. For the over-65s, between 1992 and 1996, spending on those in their last year of life represented 22% of all medical spending, 18% of all non-Medicare spending, and 25 percent of all Medicaid spending for the poor. These percentages appears to be falling over time, as in 2008, 16.8% of all medical spending on the over 65s went on those in their last year of life.

Predicting death is difficult, which has affected estimates of spending in the last year of life; when controlling for spending on patients who were predicted as likely to die, Medicare spending was estimated at 5% of the total.

=== Belgium ===
Belgium's first palliative home care team was established in 1987, and the first palliative care unit and hospital care support teams were established in 1991. A strong legal and structural framework for palliative care was established in the 1990s, which divided the country into areas of 30, where palliative care networks were responsible for coordinating palliative services. Home care was provided by palliative support teams, and each hospital and care home recognized to have a palliative support team. In 1999, Belgium ranked second (after the United Kingdom) in the number of palliative care beds per capita. In 2001, there was an active palliative care support team in 72% of hospitals and a specialized nurse or active support team in 50% nursing homes. Government resources for palliative care doubled in 2000, and in 2007 Belgium was ranked third out of 52 countries worldwide in terms of resources for palliative care. (Together with the United Kingdom and Ireland) to raise public awareness under the auspices of EoL 6 According to the Lien Foundation report, Belgium ranks 5th (out of 40 countries worldwide) for the overall level of mortality.

=== Indonesia ===
Palliative care services in Indonesia were first introduced in 1992 and formally incorporated into national health policy in 2007. Indonesia ranked 53rd out of 80 countries in the 2015 Quality of Death Index, reflecting relatively limited integration of end-of-life care into the healthcare system compared to global standards.

As of 2026, access to end-of-life care remains highly unequal. Recent reviews indicate that palliative care services are still limited in availability and are not fully integrated into the national health system, with significant disparities between urban and rural areas. The burden of care is often shifted to families due to insufficient institutional support. In many cases, patients rely on informal caregiving at home, with substantial financial and emotional strain, and continued reliance on out-of-pocket payments or charitable assistance.

Assessments described palliative care services as being "in their infancy," with many patients lacking access to appropriate end-of-life care altogether.

== See also ==
- Advance health care directive
- Death midwife
- Liverpool Care Pathway
- My body, my choice
- Children's palliative care
- Physician assisted suicide
- Right to die
- Robert Martensen
