= Journal of Pain and Symptom Management =

- Discipline: Pain management
- Language: English
- Edited by: Russell K. Portenoy

Publication details
- Former name(s): PRN Forum
- History: 1982–present
- Publisher: Elsevier
- Frequency: Monthly
- Impact factor: 4.7 (2022)

Standard abbreviations
- ISO 4: J. Pain Symptom Manag.
- NLM: J Pain Symptom Manage

Indexing
- ISSN: 0885-3924 (print); 1873-6513 (web)
- OCLC no.: 12629494

Links
- Journal homepage; Journal page at publisher's website; Online access

The Journal of Pain and Symptom Management is a monthly peer-reviewed medical journal that was established in 1986. It is a continuation of the PRN Forum (Pain Research News forum), a bimonthly journal published from 1982 to 1985. It is the official journal of the American Academy of Hospice and Palliative Medicine and the National Hospice and Palliative Care Organization. It was formally the official journal of the United States Cancer Pain Relief Committee. The journal covers clinical research related to "the relief of illness burden among patients afflicted with serious or life-threatening illness".
