= EPA (disambiguation) =

EPA most commonly refers to the United States Environmental Protection Agency.

EPA may also refer to:

== Environmental protection organizations ==
- Environmental Protection Agency (disambiguation), several uses
- Environment Protection Authority (disambiguation), several uses
- Environmental Protection Administration, in Taiwan

== Law and treaties ==
- Economic partnership agreement, an economic arrangement for free trade
  - Economic Partnership Agreements, free trade schemes between the EU or the UK and other countries
- Emergency Powers Act (disambiguation), several uses
- Enduring power of attorney, a legal authorisation to act on someone else's behalf
- Environmental Protection Act (disambiguation), several uses
- Equal Pay Act (disambiguation)
- Établissement public à caractère administratif, a public law legal person in France

== Businesses and organizations ==
- European Pathway Association, a clinical research organization
- European Privacy Association, a lobbying group
- European Pressphoto Agency, a news photo agency
- Eastern Psychological Association, an American professional organization
- Protestant Church of Algeria (Eglise Protestante d'Algérie)

== Science and technology ==
- Epa (moth), a synonym for the genus Euplexia
- Eicosapentaenoic acid, an omega-3 fatty acid
- Proton affinity, E_{pa}
- Electron probe analysis, a synonym for electron probe microanalysis
- Electrostatic Protected Areas, for protection against electrostatic discharge
- Exapascal (EPa, 10^{18} Pascal), a multiple of the Pascal unit of pressure

== Transportation ==
- Eastern Provincial Airways, Canada
- El Palomar Airport, Argentina, IATA airport code EPA
- EPA, a class designation for Reading electric multiple units
- EPA tractor, a type of tractor in Sweden

== Other uses ==
- EPA Larnaca FC, a former Cypriot football club
- Epa mask, a ceremonial mask worn by the Yoruba people
- East Palo Alto, California, a city in the US
- English Phonotypic Alphabet, a proposed phonetic alphabet for spelling reform
- European Practice Assessment, for quality management in primary health care
- Standard for Andalusian (Êttandâ pal andalûh), a proposed standard for Andalusian Spanish

== See also ==
- Eppa, a masculine given name
- List of environmental ministries
- List of health and environmental agencies in the United States
