= Healthcare in Europe =

European health care

Public health insurance coverage

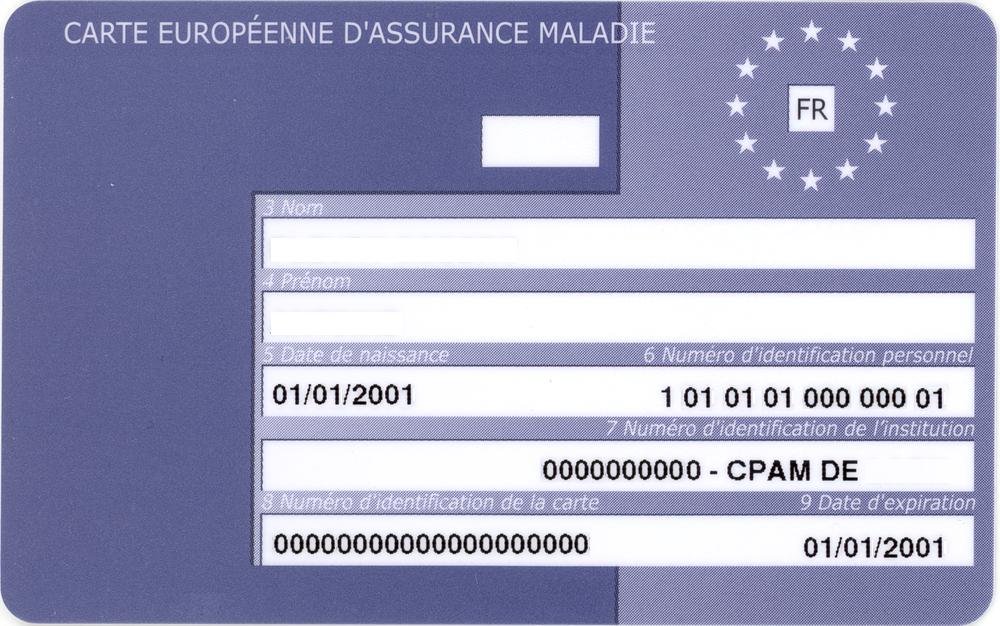
European Health Insurance Card (French version pictured)

Healthcare in Europe is provided through a wide range of different systems run at individual national levels. Most European countries have a system of tightly regulated, competing private health insurance companies, with government subsidies available for citizens who cannot afford coverage. Many European countries (and all European Union countries) offer their citizens a European Health Insurance Card which, on a reciprocal basis, provides insurance for emergency medical treatment insurance when visiting other participating European countries.

== Health in Europe ==
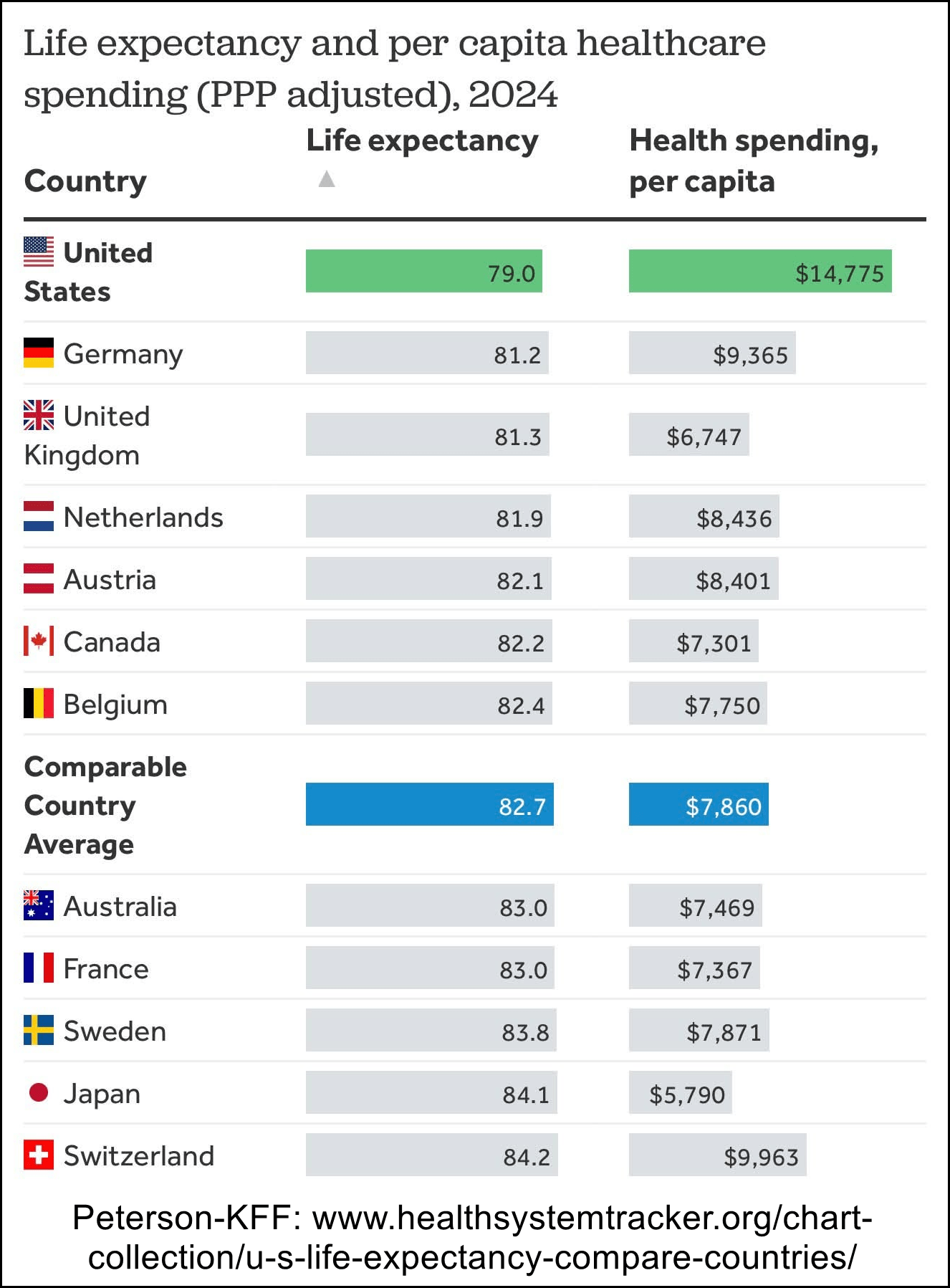
US life expectancy and per capita healthcare spending compared to other wealthy countries (mainly Europe). From Peterson-KFF Health System Tracker.

The World Health Organization has listed 53 countries as comprising the European region. Health outcomes vary greatly by country. Countries in Northern and Western Europe have had a significant increase in life expectancy since World War II, while most of the former Eastern Bloc countries have experienced a decrease in life expectancy.

Tobacco smoking is the largest preventable cause of death in Europe. Many countries have passed legislation in the past few decades restricting tobacco sales and use. According to the European Health Interview Survey (EHIS) conducted between 2013 and 2015, substantial inequalities existed in terms of sex, age and education level concerning the proportion of adults who were daily cigarette smokers.

=== European Union ===
The European Union has no major administrative or legal responsibility in the field of healthcare. The European Commission's Directorate-General for Health and Consumers however seeks to align national laws on the safety of food and other products, on consumers' rights, and on the protection of people's health, to formulate new EU wide laws and thus strengthen its internal markets.

Both the World Health Organization Regional Office for Europe (WHO/Europe) and the European Centre for Disease Prevention and Control are involved in public health development in Europe.

=== COVID-19 pandemic ===
Governments adopted healthcare standards aimed at the number of infected and people who are deceased. A widespread vaccination campaign helped to lower the COVID-19 mortality rate. In addition to the COVID-19 vaccines, the mortality rates were determined by the number of physicians, the number of available Intensive care unit (ICU) beds and safety policies carried out by governments. Mortality rates varied in Europe depending on whether the countries have a higher or lower rate of the adult population over 65 years of age. Studies show that having an adequate number of health professionals is one of the most important variables in reducing the number of deaths. Healthcare spending in the EU was 10.9% of GDP in 2020, up one percentage point from 2019. The governments in various countries pay for a major portion of these expenses.

==== Response ====
In responding to the COVID-19 pandemic, public health infrastructures and resources, governmental, and cultural values all play a key role in stopping the threat. Finding an approach that balances effectiveness, efficiency, and successful response to the pandemic is the key to ending the crisis.

European Union countries Greece and Sweden have similar populations and sizes. They have a difficult cultural and political stance. The government response of various European countries to the pandemic was to stay home and slow down the spread of the virus. It was proactive in closing businesses and stores early on and even before the first COVID-19 death. The governmental response including the banning of all international non-essential travel and COVID-19 lockdowns helped to keep the death toll to a minimum.

In comparison, the government response to COVID-19 in Sweden was much less stringent than in Greece. The government of Sweden focused on guidelines that encourage all citizens to take personal responsibility in containing the virus. The Public Health Agency of Sweden proposed a ban on gatherings over 500 people, including social distancing. The key concept proposed was solidarity through individual responsibility with all Swedish citizens obeying the guidelines.

Triaging issues that determined medical priority to increase survival rates from COVID-19 contrasted between Sweden and Greece. The Europeans focused strictly on medical protocols and technical expertise from the medical field. This caused a fundamental collapse of the healthcare system, needless deaths, and a misinformed and distrusting public that demanded more accountability from the European Union members, the government, and health professionals. With a similar population of 10 million people and other issues aside. As of 10 December 2021, there have been 18,982 deaths in Greece and 15,152 deaths in Sweden.

=== Life expectancy ===
There is a big gap between genders in life expectancy due to income groups. Studies show that the highest income group tends to live longer. For example, Eastern Europe is a low-income region, with a lower life expectancy due to biological factors including genetics, nutrition, and even hormonal issues. However, other factors are non-biological such as smoking and drinking that tend to be part of the decrease in life expectancy for men. These unhealthy lifestyles create life-threatening diseases such as lung cancer and cardiovascular complications. The consumption of alcohol in Europe by men is usually more common between the ages of 20–34 years in men and would increase the life expectancy if consumption is lowered. Another non-biological factor that cooperates with the decrease in life expectancy in Eastern Europe would be unhealthy stress that affects cardiovascular health.

Life expectancy has risen from birth rates due to significant factors such as the decrease in children's mortality rates, increase in the standard of living, better education, and advances in healthcare and medicine. Since the 1960s studies and statistics have shown a rise in life expectancy by a pair of numbers per decade. However, from 2019 to 2020 a slight increase in life expectancy occurred by about 0.2 yrs. Nonetheless, in 2020 a drastic decrease in life expectancy occurred by about - 1.75. This occurred only in some states of Europe because of the COVID-19 pandemic. According to a new study published by the Smithsonian Magazine by the author Ridhi Kashyap, an associate professor of social demography at the University of Oxford.

The decrease in life expectancy has been a dramatic one, which is known to be the biggest decrease in life expectancy compared to World War II. The explanation given is because due to the poor life expectancy already occurring in the European Union, COVID-19 made it worse, decreasing life expectancy and causing more deaths.

=== Vaccination rates ===
Vaccines are a powerful tool being used nationwide against COVID-19. At the beginning of the pandemic, the European population aimed to help individuals that were at most risk. This may include older adults over the age of 65 which are more likely to have other health issues. Minorities who do not have complete access to assistance and help from the government. Individuals with disabilities are more likely to be affected because of their underlying medical conditions. Minorities who do not have access to the highest level of medical help.

Due to the high demand on hospitals, the vaccines served as a mechanism to decrease the load on doctors and medics. Europe and its members have been actively contributing to handling this pandemic most simply. As of today, 66.9% of Europe's population is fully vaccinated. Europe has been following the "herd immunity" strategy which convinces its citizens to get vaccinated as soon as possible. "Herd immunity" is the idea of a vast number of people to be fully vaccinated against COVID-19. The more people who are vaccinated the less likely it is for the virus to spread. Although this has so far been successful, a substantial number of Europeans in every community are still not vaccinated. The fact that there are constantly new variants does not help because we must keep up with new statistics. In Europe, there is a limited number of vaccinations that are being offered for the people. The European center for the disease has been closely monitoring the effectiveness of each vaccine. Europe has since taken precautions to distribute vaccines safely and effectively across the country.

== Spending ==
Expand the OECD charts below to see the breakdown:

- "Government/compulsory": Government spending and compulsory health insurance.
- "Voluntary": Voluntary health insurance and private funds such as households’ out-of-pocket payments, NGOs and private corporations.

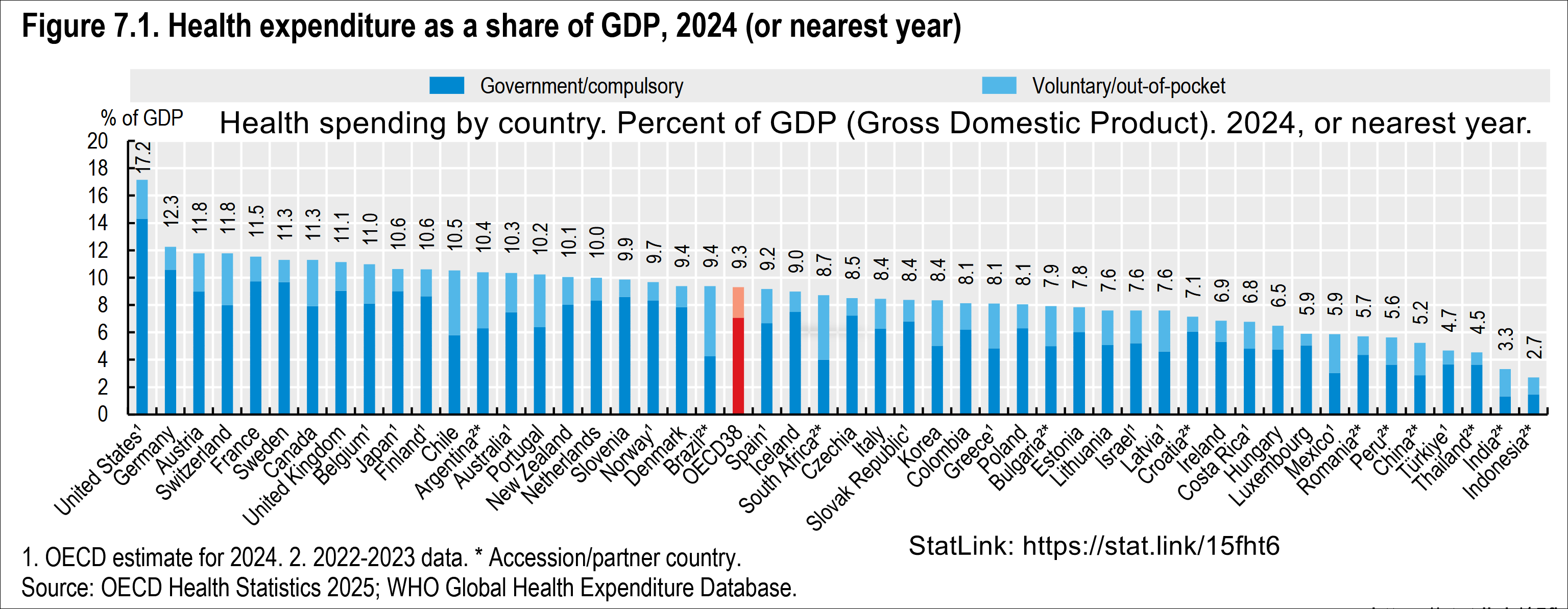
Health spending by country. Percent of GDP (Gross domestic product). For example: 11.3% for Canada in 2024. 17.2% for the United States in 2024.

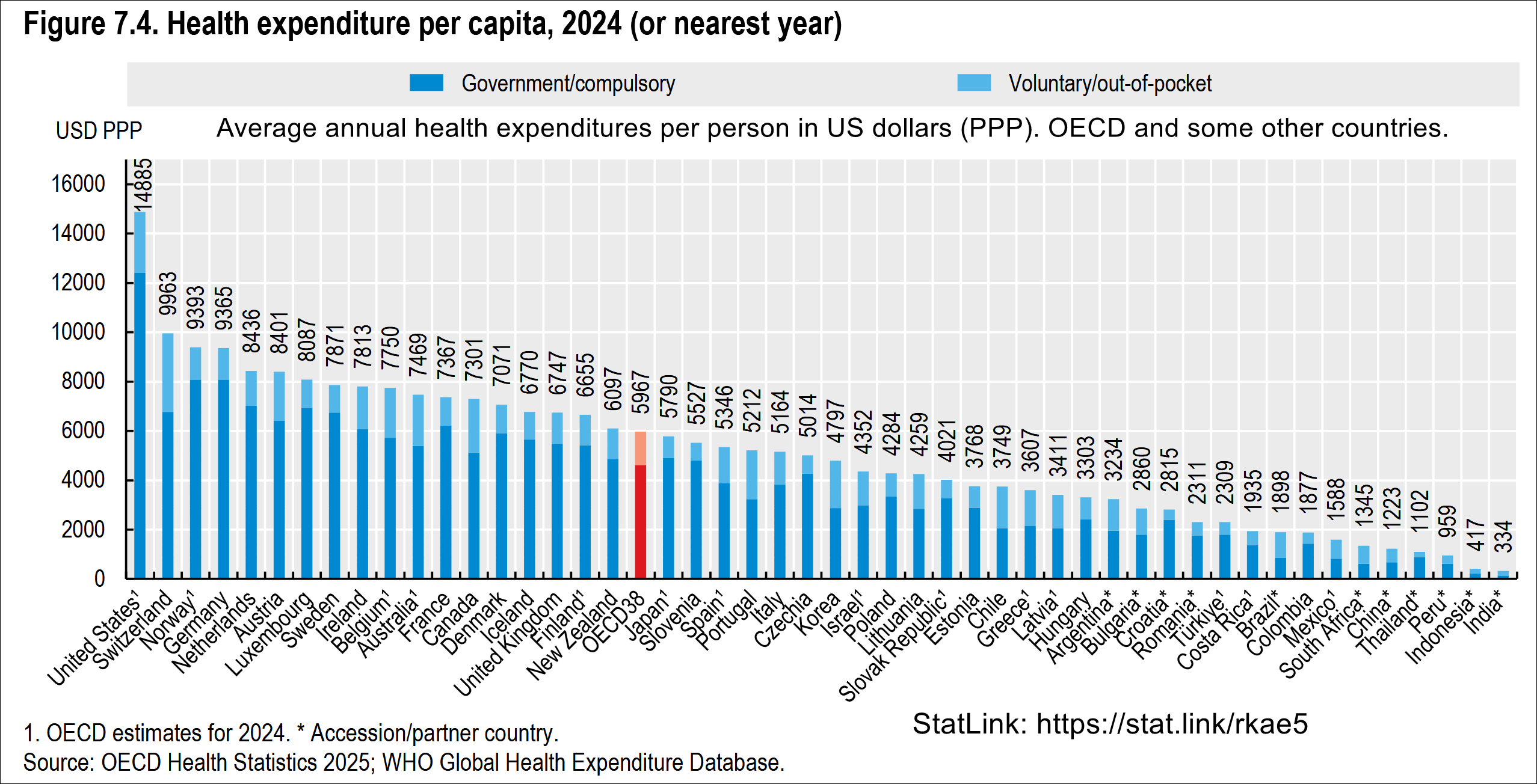
Total healthcare cost per person. Public and private spending. US dollars PPP. For example: $7,301 for Canada in 2024. $14,884 for the US in 2024.

== Spending and life expectancy ==
See: List of countries by life expectancy and List of countries by total health expenditure per capita.

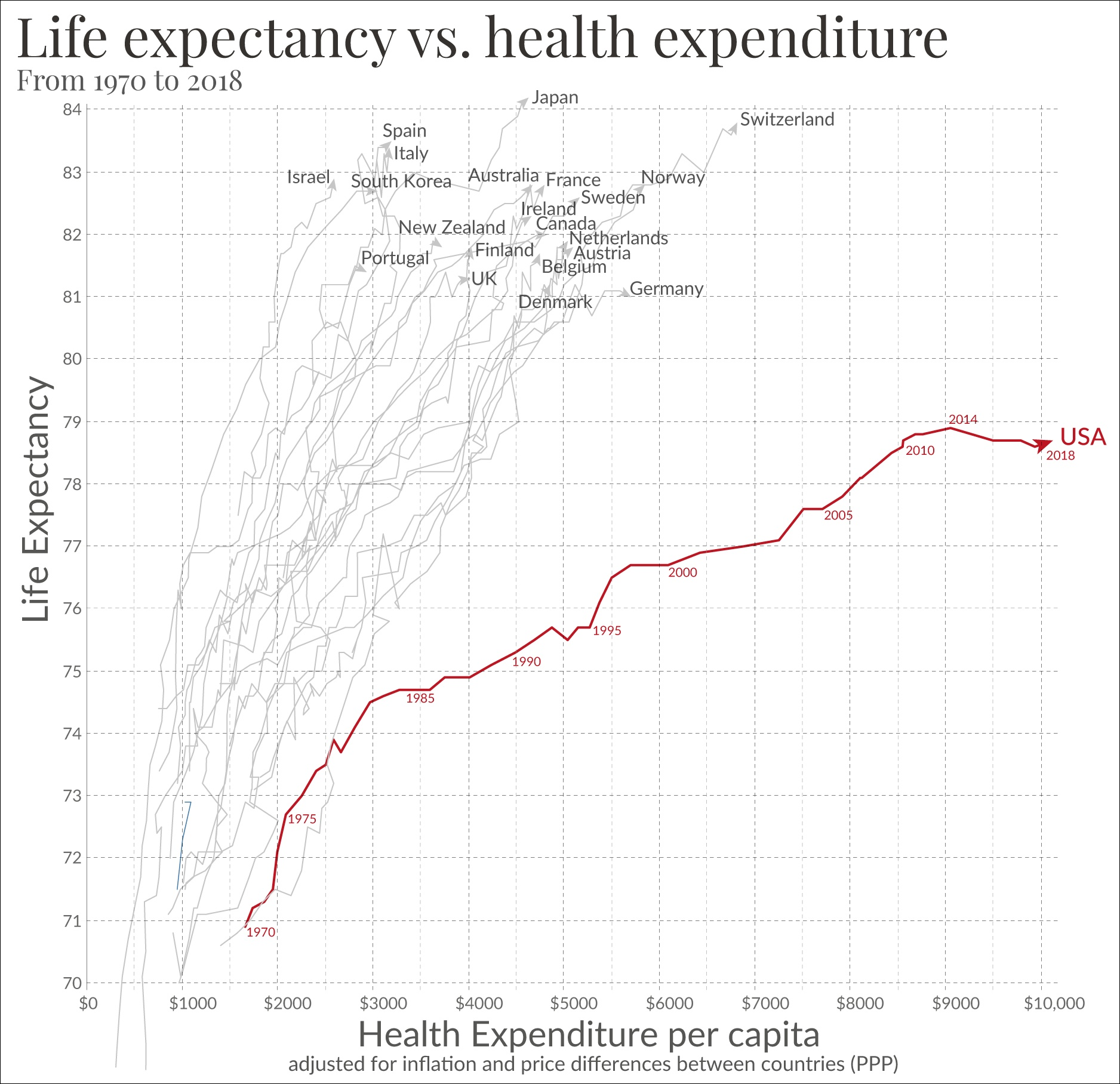
Life expectancy vs healthcare spending of rich OECD countries. US average of $10,447 in 2018.

== See also ==
- Economy of Europe
- Euro health consumer index
- European Institute of Women's Health
- European Observatory on Health Systems and Policies
- European Practice Assessment
- List of countries with universal health care
- List of European regions by life expectancy
