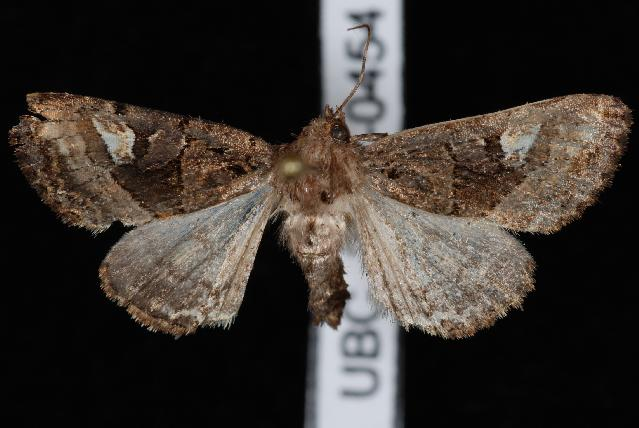

Scientific classification
- Domain: Eukaryota
- Kingdom: Animalia
- Phylum: Arthropoda
- Class: Insecta
- Order: Lepidoptera
- Superfamily: Noctuoidea
- Family: Noctuidae
- Tribe: Phlogophorini
- Genus: Euplexia
- Species: E. benesimilis

Binomial name
- Euplexia benesimilis McDunnough, 1922

= Euplexia benesimilis =

American angle shades

Species of moth

Euplexia benesimilis, the American angle shades, is a species of cutworm or dart moth in the family Noctuidae. It is found in North America.

The MONA or Hodges number for Euplexia benesimilis is 9545.
