= Euplexia euplexina =

Scientific classification
- Domain: Eukaryota
- Kingdom: Animalia
- Phylum: Arthropoda
- Class: Insecta
- Order: Lepidoptera
- Superfamily: Noctuoidea
- Family: Noctuidae
- Genus: Euplexia
- Species: E. euplexina

Binomial name
- Euplexia euplexina (Rebel, 1917)

Synonyms
- Chutapha (Brotolomia) euplexina Rebel, 1917

Species of moth

Euplexia euplexina is a moth of the family Noctuidae. It is endemic to the Canary Islands, where it is found on La Gomera, La Palma and Tenerife.

Adults are on wing year round, but are rare in summer.

The larvae feed on various ferns, including Dryopteris oligodonta, Pteridium aquilinum and Dryopteris guanchica and herbaceous plants, including Argyranthemum broussonetii and Urtica morifolia.
