= Environmental Protection Agency (disambiguation) =

Environmental Protection Agency may refer to one of the following agencies:

- Environmental Protection Agency (Queensland), Australia
- Environmental Protection Agency (Ghana)
- Environmental Protection Agency (Ireland)
- Regional Environmental Protection Agency, in Italy
- Environmental Protection Agency (Maldives)
- Environmental Protection Agency (Netherlands)
- Pakistan Environmental Protection Agency
- Scottish Environment Protection Agency
- Environmental Protection Agency (Sweden)
- United States Environmental Protection Agency
  - California Environmental Protection Agency
  - Illinois Environmental Protection Agency
  - Ohio Environmental Protection Agency

== See also ==
- Environment Protection Authority (disambiguation), several uses
- Environmental Protection Administration, in Taiwan
