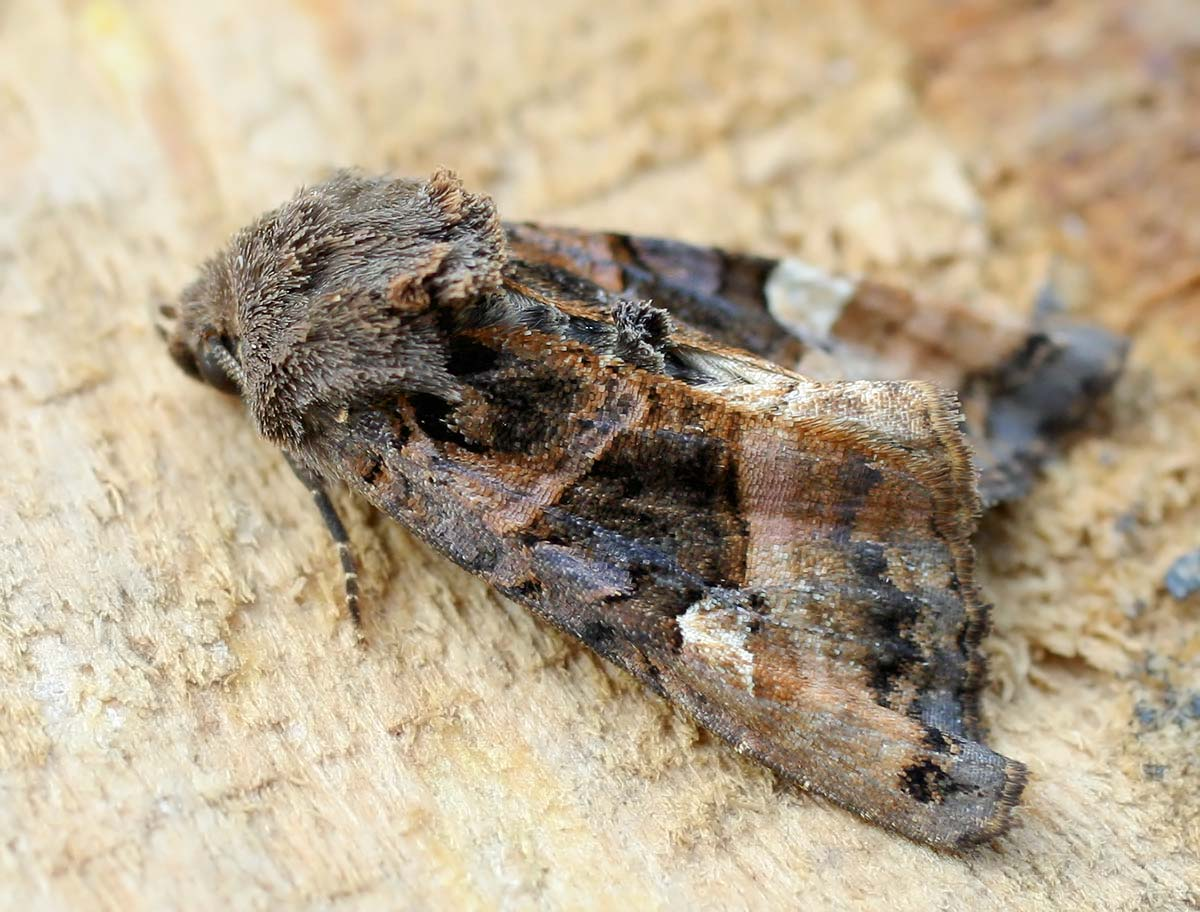

Scientific classification
- Kingdom: Animalia
- Phylum: Arthropoda
- Class: Insecta
- Order: Lepidoptera
- Superfamily: Noctuoidea
- Family: Noctuidae
- Genus: Euplexia
- Species: E. lucipara

Binomial name
- Euplexia lucipara (Linnaeus, 1758)

= Small angle shades =

Species of moth

The small angle shades (Euplexia lucipara) is a moth of the family Noctuidae. It is distributed throughout the Palearctic. The species was first described by Carl Linnaeus in his 1758 10th edition of Systema Naturae.

As the common name suggests, this species is closely related to the angle shades (Phlogophora meticulosa), and is considerably smaller (wingspan 30–35 mm), but does not especially resemble that species. The forewings are dark brown with a broad, pale subterminal band, wider and paler towards the costa. The hindwings are whitish at the base, graduating to brown at the margins. In the British Isles this species flies at night in June and July, with a second generation sometimes emerging in September. It is attracted to light and sugar.

== Distribution ==
It is found throughout Europe, in Algeria, in western Asia and through the Palearctic to Siberia, China, and Japan.

== Technical description ==
Forewing rufous ochreous tinged with purplish and mixed with olive brown; median area, a triangular blotch on inner margin near base, and a narrow praesubmarginal cloud deep olive; costa to beyond middle, the terminal area, and the orbicular stigma leaden purple; lines indistinct, the outer and inner approximating on inner margin; claviform stigma olive, dark edged; orbicular roundish, oblique, with paler ring; reniform conspicuously whitish, containing a double brown lunule; submarginal line pale, waved; veins towards termen dotted dark and pale; hindwing ochreous with dark cell mark and veins, darker in terminal half where there is visible a dark pale-edged outer and submarginal line.

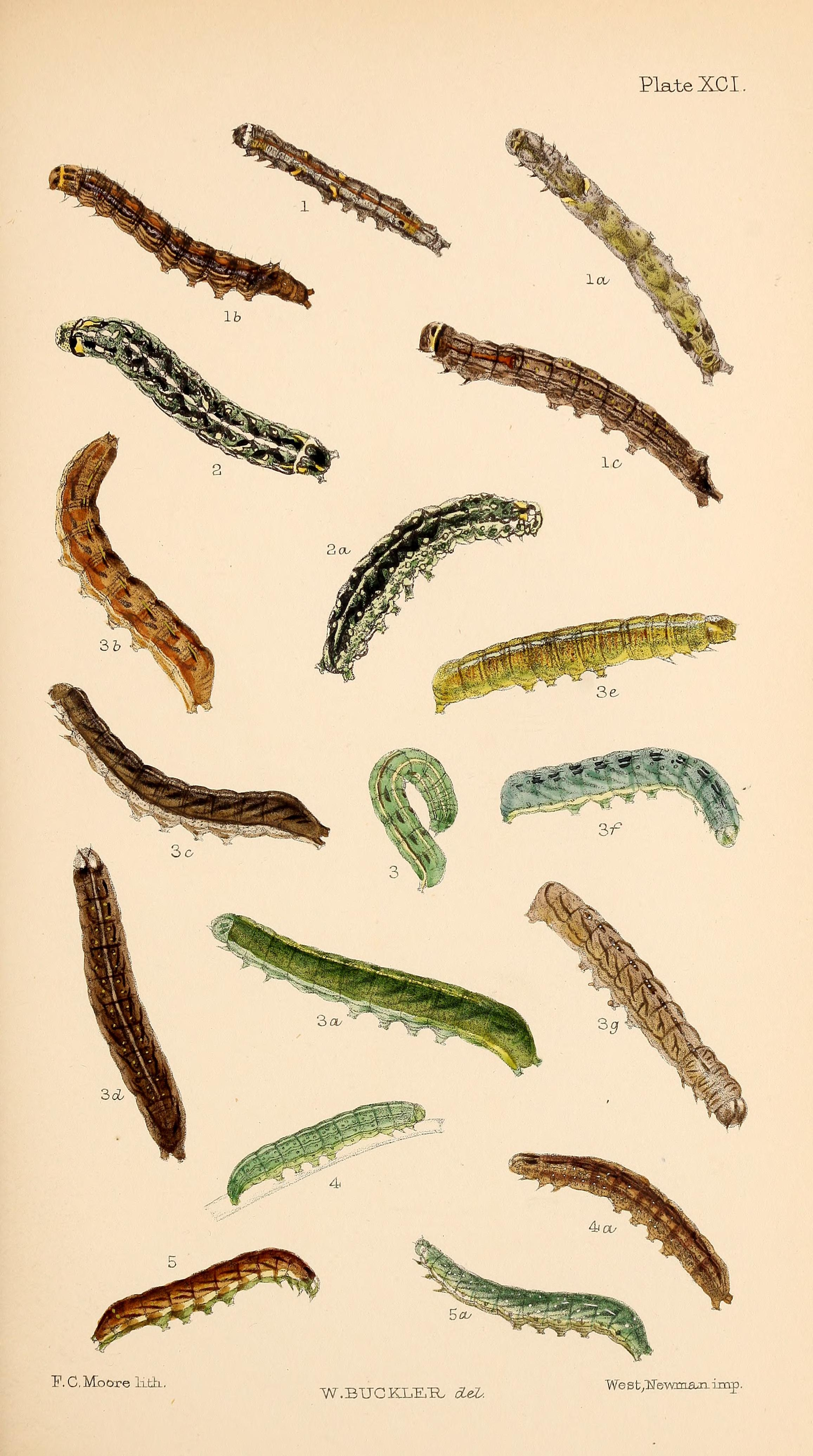
5, 5a larva after last moult

== Biology ==
Larva velvety green with darker green oblique subdorsal stripes; tubercles pale; spiracular line yellowish white; 11th segment slightly swollen, with a pair of white dots; head green.

The larvae often feed on ferns and the species is usually associated with them. Other recorded food plants include birch, false bindweed, dogwood, larkspur, willowherb, ash, ivy, lettuce, privet, loosestrife, oak, buttercup, currant, raspberry, willow, tomato, coltsfoot, nettle, and guelder rose. The species overwinters as pupae.

== Gallery ==
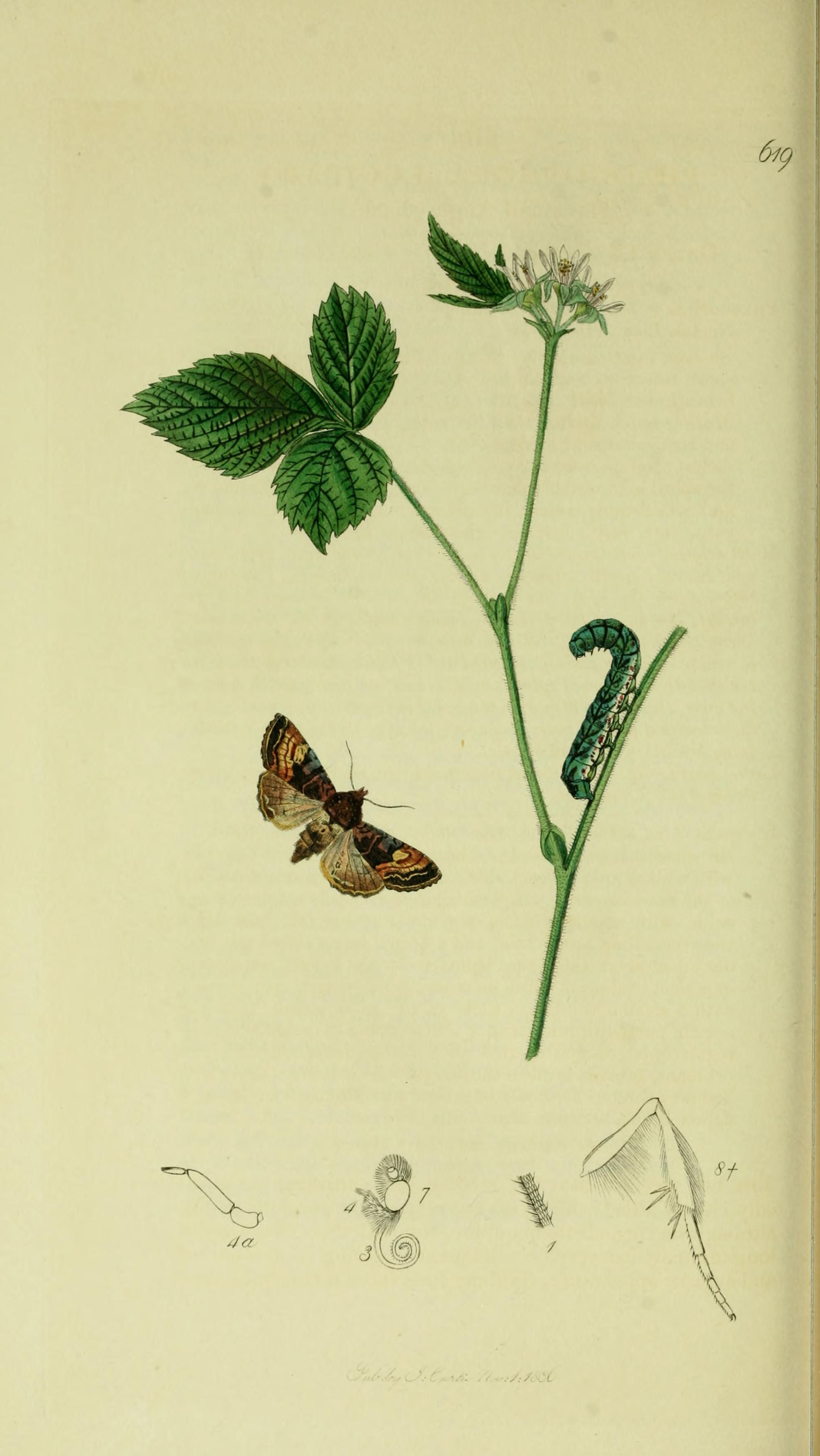
Illustration from British Entomology, Volume 5, by John Curtis

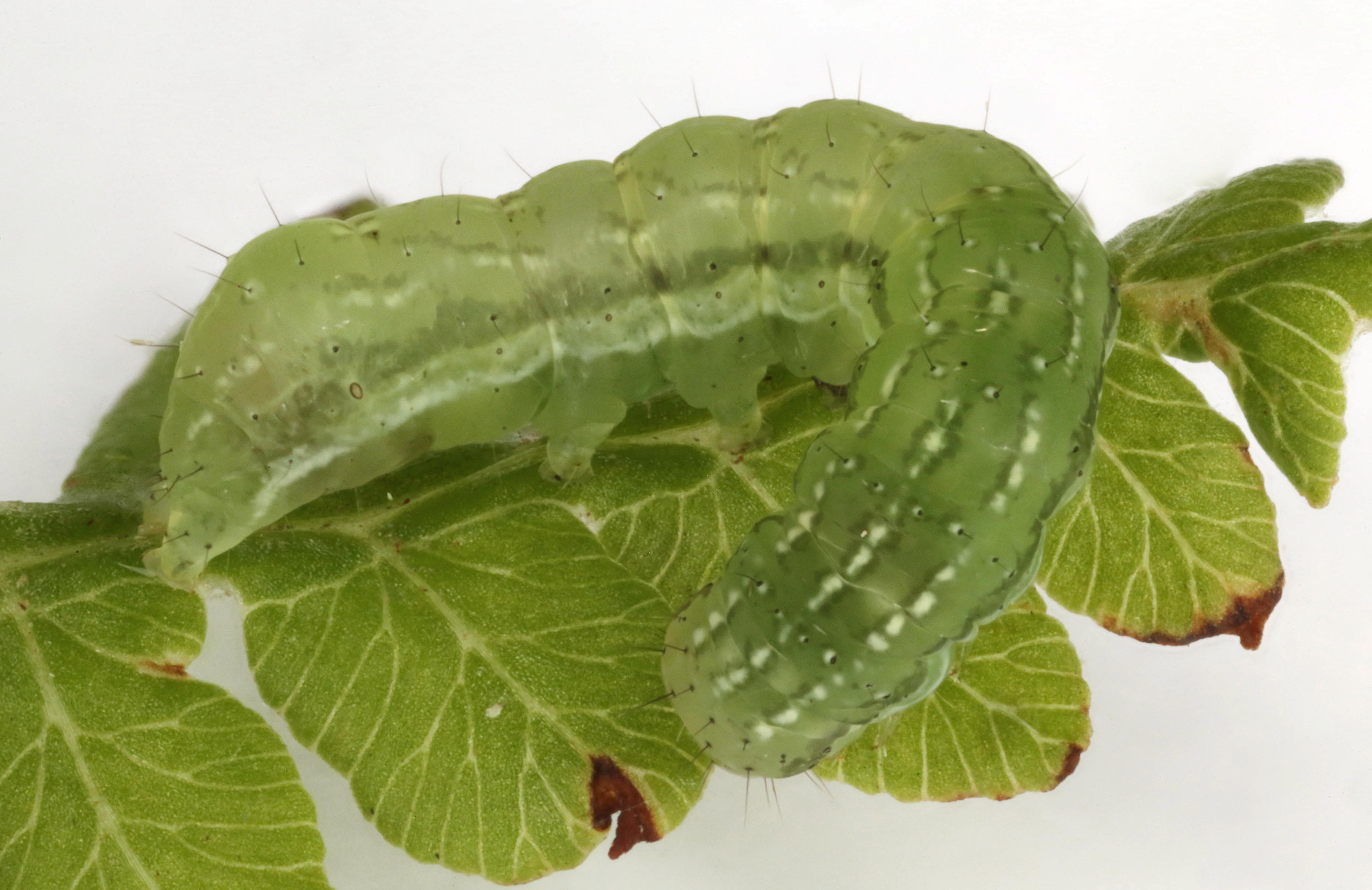
Larva.Flint, North Wales
