= Euplexia triplaga =

Scientific classification
- Kingdom: Animalia
- Phylum: Arthropoda
- Class: Insecta
- Order: Lepidoptera
- Superfamily: Noctuoidea
- Family: Noctuidae
- Genus: Euplexia
- Species: E. triplaga

Binomial name
- Euplexia triplaga (Walker, 1857)

Synonyms
- Euplexia brillians Barnes & McDunnough, 1911

Species of moth

Euplexia triplaga is a cutworm or dart moth in the family Noctuidae. The species was first described by Francis Walker in 1857. It is found in Central America and North America.

The MONA or Hodges number for Euplexia triplaga is 9544.
