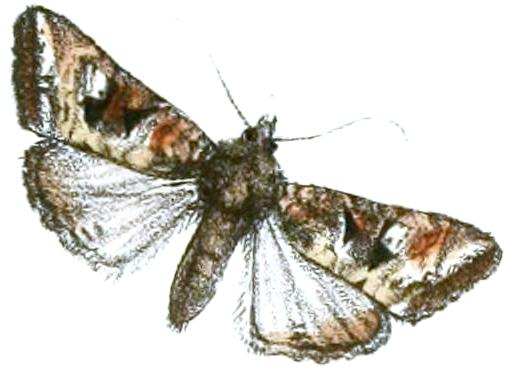

Scientific classification
- Domain: Eukaryota
- Kingdom: Animalia
- Phylum: Arthropoda
- Class: Insecta
- Order: Lepidoptera
- Superfamily: Noctuoidea
- Family: Noctuidae
- Genus: Euplexia
- Species: E. discisignata

Binomial name
- Euplexia discisignata Moore, 1867

= Euplexia discisignata =

Species of moth

Euplexia discisignata is a species of moth of the family Noctuidae. It is found in India (including Darjeeling).
