= Euplexia albonota =

Scientific classification
- Kingdom: Animalia
- Phylum: Arthropoda
- Clade: Pancrustacea
- Class: Insecta
- Order: Lepidoptera
- Superfamily: Noctuoidea
- Family: Noctuidae
- Genus: Euplexia
- Species: E. albonota

Binomial name
- Euplexia albonota Hampson, 1893

Species of moth

Euplexia albonota is a moth of the family Noctuidae first described by George Hampson in 1893. It is found in Sri Lanka.
