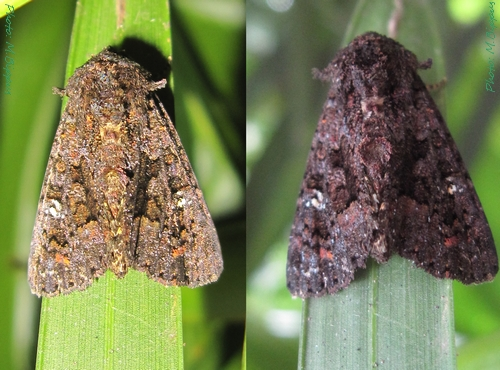

Scientific classification
- Kingdom: Animalia
- Phylum: Arthropoda
- Clade: Pancrustacea
- Class: Insecta
- Order: Lepidoptera
- Superfamily: Noctuoidea
- Family: Noctuidae
- Genus: Euplexia
- Species: E. borbonica

Binomial name
- Euplexia borbonica Viette, 1957

= Euplexia borbonica =

Species of moth

Euplexia borbonica is a moth of the family Noctuidae. It is endemic on Réunion.
