= UK Global Health Insurance Card =

UK successor to the European Health Insurance Card

- United Kingdom Countries accepting the GHIC for access to healthcare Countries accepting a British passport for access to healthcare
- Issued by: United Kingdom
- First issued: 1 January 2021
- Purpose: Access to free or reduced cost health services in countries which have a reciprocal healthcare agreement with the UK
- Valid in: Ascension Island; Australia (European Union) European Economic Area; Gibraltar; Guernsey; Isle of Man; Jersey; Montenegro; Saint Helena; Switzerland; Tristan da Cunha
- Eligibility: UK residents; (Note: Includes UK resident students studying or on placement in the EU.) UK state pension recipients living in an EU member state
- Cost: Free

The UK Global Health Insurance Card (GHIC) is a card issued by the NHS Business Services Authority on behalf of the Department for Health and Social Care in the United Kingdom. It is issued free of charge, and is valid for 5 years, to anyone covered by the social security system of the United Kingdom and provides evidence of entitlement to the provision of healthcare services under the UK's reciprocal healthcare agreements with the European Union, Switzerland, Norway, Iceland, Liechtenstein, Montenegro, Guernsey and some British Overseas Territories. It is also accepted by Australia as proof of eligibility to enrol in Medicare.

Before January 2021, UK residents, students and European Economic Area/Switzerland-resident UK state pension recipients were entitled to a European Health Insurance Card (EHIC). Under the terms of the EU–UK Trade and Cooperation Agreement, the UK and EU agreed that reciprocal healthcare provision would continue. The UK launched the Global Health Insurance Card in January 2021 to partially replace the EHIC for this purpose. The UK continues to accept EHICs issued by EU member states and issue EHICs to certain individuals who maintain entitlement under previous treaties with the EEA and Switzerland.

From January 2024, reciprocal healthcare arrangements similar to those with the EU were established between the UK and Norway, Iceland, and Liechtenstein. Consequently, the GHIC is accepted in the same countries as the UK EHIC.

Like the EHIC, the GHIC only covers healthcare which is normally covered by a statutory health care system in the visited country, so the UK government still advises travellers to purchase travel insurance.

== History ==
=== Background ===
The UK and European Union have a long history of reciprocal healthcare agreements. The UK's National Health Service was one of the first universal healthcare systems established anywhere in the world, influencing British dominions such as Australia, which then formed reciprocal agreements for their citizens to receive treatment. The European Economic Community (EEC) also agreed in 1971 that members should provide social security services including healthcare to each other's residents, and the UK joined the EEC in 1973.

Entitlement to healthcare in the EEC and later EU is based on residence rather than citizenship. As proof of citizenship does not prove entitlement to healthcare, the European Commission made the decision in 2003 to create the EHIC, available to residents entitled to healthcare. As an EU member state, the UK issued this card to all entitled persons between 2004 and 2020. However, in 2020, the UK withdrew from the European Union, so that reciprocal healthcare elements of the EU and associated treaties with the EEA and Switzerland ceased to apply to the UK. Initial withdrawal agreements with those respective parties included some provision to continue to recognise EHICs for individuals with an entitlement pre-dating the UK's withdrawal from the European Single Market.

=== Establishment and later expansion ===
In December 2020, the UK and EU concluded the EU–UK Trade and Cooperation Agreement, which allowed for continued healthcare reciprocity and acceptance of EU-issued EHICs. The UK opted to begin issuing its own card as evidence for individuals covered by the UK system. The intention is that this new "Global Health Insurance Card" will ultimately be used not only for European reciprocal care, but also reciprocal care agreements with other countries that the UK signs treaties with.

Social security coordination with Switzerland, which includes re-establishment of reciprocal healthcare recognising the GHIC scheme, was agreed, effective from 2022. This was the first non-EU country and first EFTA member to which GHIC validity was expanded.

A social security coordination agreement with the other EFTA countries was agreed in June 2023 which extended the UK's reciprocal healthcare agreements to Norway, Iceland and Liechtenstein from the implementation date in January 2024.

== Appearance ==
Promotional mockup GHIC

Design of the neutral GHIC (Note: Issued cards contain the same hologram as the standard card.)

The appearance of the UK Global Health Insurance Card is derived from the previously issued EHIC. All EHIC fields used on the UK-issued EHIC have been carried over in the same format, however the field numbering system of the EHIC common model have been removed. Fields include:

- Name (family names)
- Given names
- Date of birth
- Personal identification number, applicable to all UK EHICs and GHICs issued to an individual
- Identification number of the issuing institution (usually 0001 for the Department for Work and Pensions)
- Unique identification number of the card

The background of the card consists of a Union Flag design, and a hologram shows an image of the Union Flag and the Staff of Asclepius on the upper right corner. Where the applicant lives in Northern Ireland, a more neutral design can optionally be issued with a plain background more closely resembling the EHIC.

A Provisional Replacement Certificate (PRC) can be issued by the UK to cover people travelling abroad who require medical attention but have lost or forgotten their GHIC.

== Eligibility ==
=== Eligibility for the GHIC ===
Those eligible for a GHIC are:

- British and Irish citizens habitually resident in the UK;
- All other persons resident in the UK with valid leave to remain;
- Recipients of a UK state pension living in the EU or Switzerland;
- Students normally resident in the UK who are undertaking study or a work placement in the EU or Switzerland;
- Workers normally resident in the UK but temporarily posted abroad by their employer.

Anyone with a UK-issued EHIC that has not expired does not need a GHIC until it expires.

=== Eligibility for a UK-issued EHIC ===
Those who remain eligible for a UK-issued EHIC, valid also in Norway, Iceland or Liechtenstein, are:

- EU, Swiss, Norwegian, Icelandic or Liechtenstein citizens living in the UK from before 1 January 2021, and their dependants;
- Recipients of a UK state pension living in the EU registered on form S1 or E121, and their dependants;
- Frontier workers working across the UK border since before 1 January 2021 and registered on form S1 or E106, and their dependants;
- Workers normally resident in the UK but temporarily posted abroad by their employer in the EU, Switzerland, Norway, Iceland or Liechtenstein since before 1 January 2021, and their dependants;
- Students normally resident in the UK who have been undertaking study or a work placement in the EU, Switzerland, Norway, Iceland or Liechtenstein from before 1 January 2021.

== Acceptance and validity ==
The eligibility rules for each of these agreements may differ from GHIC eligibility, and the scope of treatment offered may also differ from that in the UK-EU GHIC agreement. However, these countries now accept the GHIC as evidence of entitlement to their respective bilateral scheme:

- Ascension Island
- Australia - Came into effect in 2022.
- European Union
- Gibraltar
- Guernsey - Came into effect in 2023.
- Iceland - Came into effect in 2024.
- Isle of Man
- Jersey
- Liechtenstein - Came into effect in 2024.
- Montenegro
- Norway - Came into effect in 2024.
- Saint Helena
- Switzerland - Came into effect in 2022.
- Tristan da Cunha

Current status of global reciprocal healthcare agreements with the United Kingdom United Kingdom Reciprocal agreements through the Global Health Insurance Card (GHIC)/European Health Insurance Card(EHIC) programmes Other residence-based reciprocal healthcare agreements Citizenship-based reciprocal healthcare agreements

The UK also has reciprocal healthcare agreements with Bosnia and Herzegovina, Kosovo, North Macedonia, New Zealand, Serbia and the British Overseas Territories of Anguilla, the British Virgin Islands, the Falkland Islands, Montserrat, and the Turks and Caicos Islands. However, the GHIC has not been acknowledged as legal verification for reciprocal healthcare under these agreements.

== See also ==
- EU–UK Trade and Cooperation Agreement
- European Health Insurance Card
