= European Institute of Women's Health =

Women health organization

European Institute of Women's Health (EIWH)
- Formation: 1996
- Founder: Peg Maguire
- Legal status: Registered charity
- Purpose: Positively influencing health policy at the European Parliament, European Commission and works with other International Organisations and Agencies to ensure health and well being of all people are and remain a priority issue. Has a special interest in sex and gender issues and their impact on health.
- Headquarters: 33 Pearse St., Dublin 2, Ireland
- Location: Dublin, Ireland
- Region served: European Union
- Products: Cancom: Cancer online information services with information downloads for women. A growing range of health related policy briefs and other research based information material mainly for women and their families and developed to positively influence the development of health policy by positively informing decision makers at European Union and national member levels.
- Services: Information, dissemination, research & project management
- Members: 210
- Official language: English
- Director General: Peg Maguire
- Board of directors: Yes
- Parent organization: None
- Subsidiaries: EAC
- Affiliations: EPHA,
- Staff: 2
- Volunteers: 20
- Remarks: currently developing other specific health related websites starting with http://nosmoki.ng

The European Institute of Women's Health (EIWH) is a women's health and family health policy development institution. It was established in 1996, primarily to ensure women's health. All aspects of family health and well-being were on the European and national member parliament agendas. The EIWH is a non-governmental organization, established as a company, and has no shares. Its administrative office is based in Dublin, Ireland and it is a registered charity.

The EIWH aims to influence the European Parliament, European Commission, and other international organizations and agencies to ensure the health and well-being of women in particular. They actively work to promote increased understanding of the roles of biological sex and gender as determinants of health in order to develop comprehensive health care systems across Europe that provide equitable care to all.
