= Environment Protection Authority =

Environmental Protection Authority or Environmental Protection Authority may refer to:

- New South Wales Environment Protection Authority
- Environment Protection Authority (Tasmania)
- Environment Protection Authority (Victoria)
- Environmental Protection Authority (Western Australia)
- Environmental Protection Authority (New Zealand)

== See also ==
- Environmental Protection Agency (disambiguation)
- Environmental Protection Administration, in Taiwan
