= Equal Pay Act =

Equal Pay Act may refer to:

- Equal Pay Act of 1963, in the US
- Equal Pay Act 1970, in the UK
