= Environmental Regulatory Authority =

Environmental regulator of the Maldives

- އެންވަޔަރަންމަންޓަލް ރެގިއުލޭޓަރީ އޮތޯރިޓީ
- Logo used since 2025

Agency overview
- Formed: 18 December 2008
- Preceding agency: Environmental Research Center and Maldives Water & Sanitation Authority
- Jurisdiction: Government of the Maldives
- Headquarters: Henveiru, Malé
- Agency executive: Hassan Mohamed
- Website: era.gov.mv

The Environmental Regulatory Authority (Dhivehi: އެންވަޔަރަންމަންޓަލް ރެގިއުލޭޓަރީ އޮތޯރިޓީ; ERA) is a legal regulatory entity, working under the Ministry of Climate Change, Environment and Energy.

== History ==
The Environmental Protection Agency (EPA) was formed when Environmental Research Center and Maldives Water & Sanitation Authority was merged by the president on 18 December 2008. It was previously run by a governing board.

=== Rename to Environmental Regulatory Authority ===
In 2025, President Mohamed Muizzu renamed the EPA to the Environmental Regulatory Authority and had placed it under the oversight of the Ministry of Tourism and Environment.

This move sparked major controversy from opposition parties and environmentalists. Former president Ibrahim Mohamed Solih and former environment minister Aminath Shauna condemned the move.
