= Epa mask =

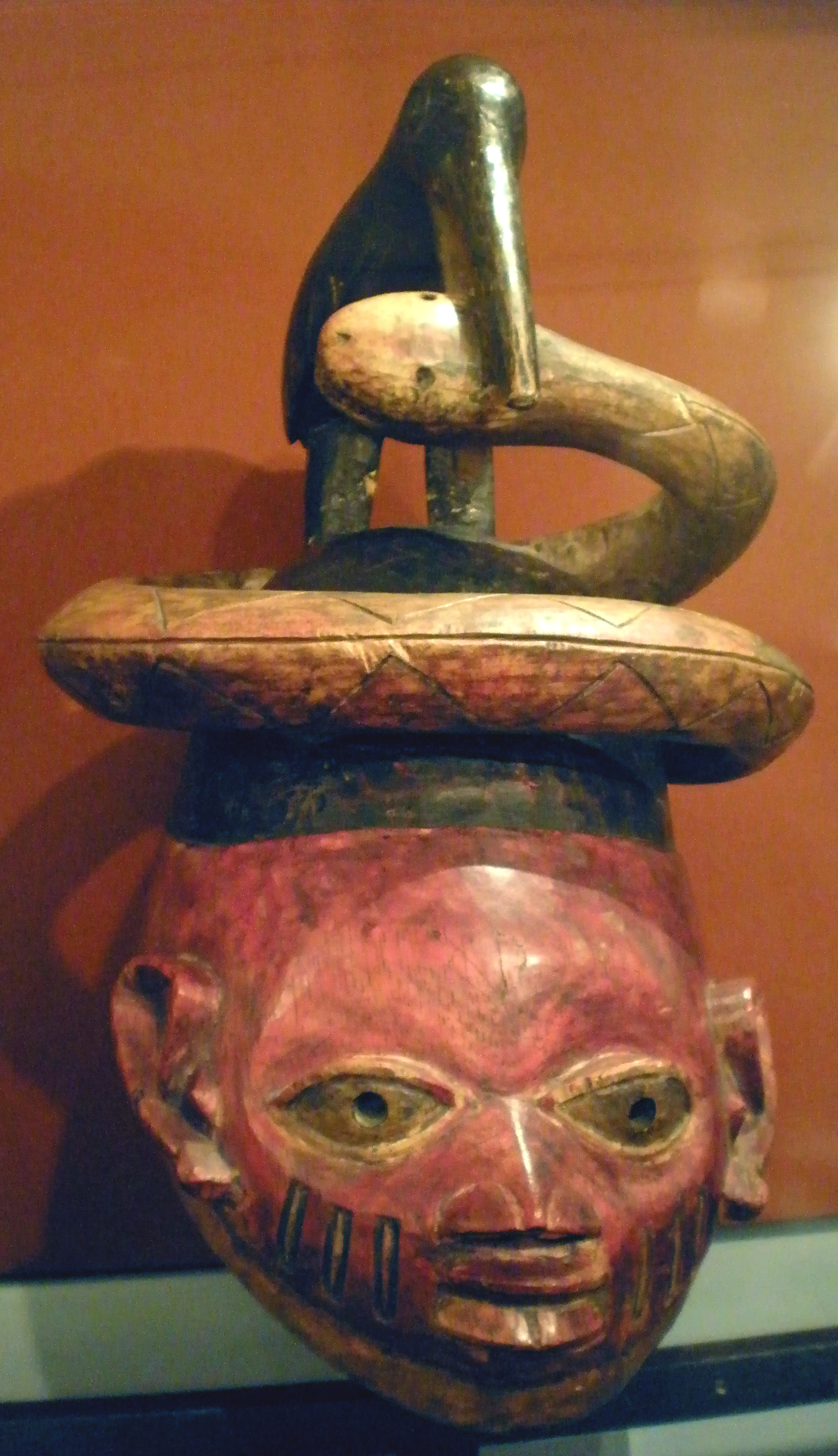
Epa mask, collection of the Horniman Museum

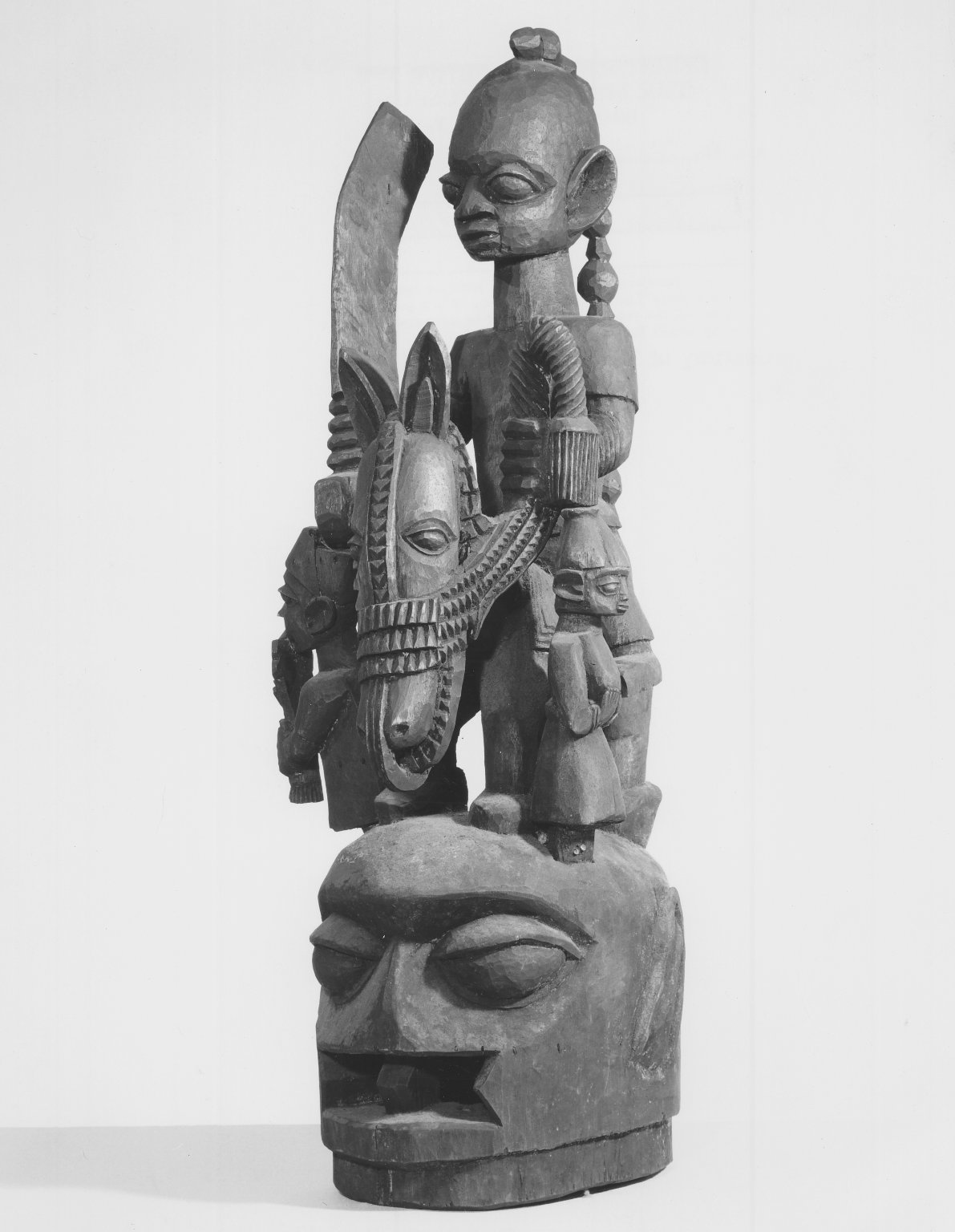
Epa Mask, collection of the Brooklyn Museum

An Epa mask is a ceremonial mask worn by the Yoruba people of Nigeria during the Epa masquerade. Carvings representing priests, hunters, farmers, kings, and mothers are usually depicted on the masks. They are used to acknowledge important roles within the community, and to honor those who perform the roles, as well as ancestors who performed those roles in the past.

When not being used during performances, Epa masks are kept in shrines where they are the focus of prayers and offerings from community elders.

== History ==
Epa masks originated from the seventeen kingdoms which make up the Ekiti region in the north-east of Yoruba territory. Unlike other parts of Yorubaland, Ekiti has been subject to extensive foreign influences. The area received successive waves of immigration from Ife in the sixteenth century and from the Bini in the seventeenth, as well as being the target of military raids from Ilorin and Ibadan in the middle or late nineteenth century. Until the beginning of the nineteenth century the area was considered to have formed part of the Benin empire. Consequently, its population has a complex mixed ethnic origin which has given rise to some unique traditions not previously found elsewhere in Yorubaland but which have since spread to the Iyagba, Igbomina, Oshun, Owo and Ijesha regions. It is also not surprising to find that the warrior figures often surmounting Epa masks represent heroes who proved their mettle during this long period of instability.

== Design ==
Epa masks consist of a Janus faced helmet and an often elaborate figurative superstructure usually carved with a female or equestrian figure at its center. Surrounding the central figure are typically smaller figures, representing traders, musicians, hunters and other personages central to Yoruba community life. Many Epa masks bear names like 'Mother with Children', 'Owner of Many Children', 'Children Cover Me' (like a protecting cloth), 'Children are Honorable to Have', 'Bringer of Children', 'Mother of Twins', 'Nursing Mother' and many other similar appellations, which occur in the songs that accompany the dancers.

The helmet is always simply carved, often with two faces, and is reminiscent of a mortar or pot. Such similarities are made explicit in the term for the helmet, tkiko ('pot'), alluding to it as a container of spiritual power and otherworldly force, ase. The eyes of one face are usually carved open, looking out to the world of the living, while those on the other are sealed, contemplating the realm of the divine and the ancestors. Much Yoruba ceremonial is concerned with the control and focusing of this divine force for the benefit of the community. The control and focusing of ase is a central theme throughout the different episodes that make up the Epa festival as well as apparently constituting a theme in other ceremonies in which Epa masks are used. The equestrian figures from episodes from the region's turbulent history incorporate representations of the channeling of ase to safeguard the conquering hero. Maternity figures invoke ase for increasing procreative abilities and fertility, while references to medicine also express the dependence of personal well-being on the judicial channeling of ase. Perhaps, then, the iconographic clue to the meaning of Epa masks is not to be found in their elaborate superstructures, but in the crude pot helmet itself as a manifestation of the efficacy of ase for communal and personal well-being.

== Ritual Context ==
In north-west Yorubaland the Epa masks are kept by the head of a lineage or a town chief on behalf of the lineage or community. When in use they are choreographed as emerging from the bush, where they return once the festival is completed. Offerings may be made to a mask before it is used or during the ceremony. According to Robert Thompson, 'the Epa cult stresses the transformation of young men into stalwart specimens able to bear pain and shoulder heavy weight'. King Arowolo of lloro distinguished between the type of energy belonging to the cult of Elefon, concerned with ancestral spirits, and the cult of Epa, connected with the dignified, slow and patient masquerades of ancient men and culture heroes. While the Ekiti Yoruba share their principal deities with Yoruba from elsewhere, they also have many deities and masquerades peculiar to themselves, leading other fieldworkers to note that the distinction is less clear than Thompson suggested. In north-eastern Yorubaland, Epa and other masks are used in annual ceremonies, held in February or March in some places or as late as September in others to promote the fertility and well-being of the community. They also appear in Elefon festivals performed to celebrate the return of the warriors, to honor Ogun, the god of war and iron and to mark the growth of new crops. Elsewhere such masks were used in post-burial rites relating to titled men. In one fairly consistent episode in the festival the masquerader, supporting a mask which can often weigh 50 lbs or more, attempts to jump off a mound to augur the quality of the new year. A fall or loss of balance is read as a bad omen which may herald coming misfortune.

== Epa Masquerade ==
Early writers interpreted Epa ceremonies as entirely focused on fertility. However, others have found the ceremonies to be equally concerned with warriors and the medicine God Osanyin, relating them to both physical and spiritual security. Ojo, following Carroll, has proposed that at one level the ceremonies incorporate the re-enactment of historical events. In a ceremony recorded by Heyden in lloro, Ekiti, masks surmounted by female figures were identified as the wives of the warrior Okotorojo, represented by an animal mask resembling a goat or antelope. Okotorojo, the principal figure in the festival, was chained to another man described as either having the duty to restrain the wild powers of the warrior or, paradoxically, as the representative of the power (ase) of Eleda, who always remains behind the warrior to render him invincible in battle.
