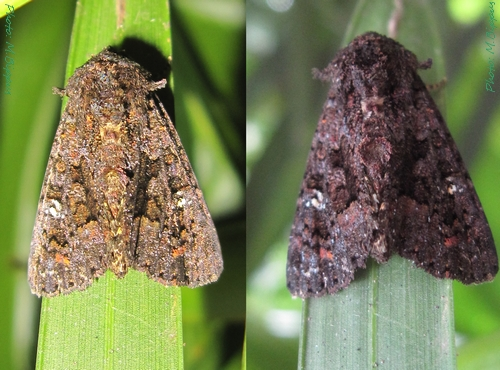
- Euplexia borbonica

Scientific classification
- Kingdom: Animalia
- Phylum: Arthropoda
- Class: Insecta
- Order: Lepidoptera
- Superfamily: Noctuoidea
- Family: Noctuidae
- Tribe: Phlogophorini
- Genus: Euplexia; Stephens, 1829

Synonyms
- Berhaea Walker, 1858; Epa Bethune-Baker, 1906

= Euplexia =

Genus of moths

Euplexia is a genus of moths of the family Noctuidae described by James Francis Stephens in 1829.

== Description ==
Its eyes are naked with or without eyelashes. The proboscis is well developed. Palpi upturned, second joint not reaching vertex of head and fringed with hair. Whereas third joint is prominent. Thorax with a slight tuft of outspreading hair behind the collar and paired tufts on metathorax. Abdomen with dorsal tufts on proximal segments and tibia spineless. Forewings with crenulate cilia.

== Species ==
- Euplexia albiclausa Warren, 1916
- Euplexia albifusa (Hampson, 1908)
- Euplexia albilineola (Wileman & South, 1918)
- Euplexia albinota (Moore, 1867)
- Euplexia albirena Wileman, 1914
- Euplexia alboguttata Warren, 1912
- Euplexia albonota Hampson, 1893
- Euplexia amblypennis Strand, 1920
- Euplexia annapurna Hreblay & Ronkay, 1998
- Euplexia atrovirens (Moore, 1867)
- Euplexia augens Felder & Rogenhofer, 1874
- Euplexia azyga Hampson, 1908
- Euplexia benesimilis McDunnough, 1922
- Euplexia borbonica Viette, 1957
- Euplexia carnefusa Warren, 1912
- Euplexia carneola Warren, 1912
- Euplexia catephiodes Hampson, 1908
- Euplexia cervinipennis Warren, 1912
- Euplexia chalybsa Hampson, 1908
- Euplexia chlorerythra Swinhoe, 1895
- Euplexia chlorogrammata Hampson, 1902
- Euplexia complicata Warren, 1912
- Euplexia connexa Warren, 1912
- Euplexia cuprea Moore, 1874
- Euplexia delineata Warren, 1912
- Euplexia dinawa Bethune-Baker, 1906
- Euplexia discisignata Moore, 1867
- Euplexia dubiosa (Bethune-Baker, 1891)
- Euplexia euplexina (Rebel, 1917)
- Euplexia exangulata Warren, 1912
- Euplexia fasciata Hampson, 1891
- Euplexia figurata Warren, 1912
- Euplexia ikondae Berio, 1973
- Euplexia imperator Laporte, 1984
- Euplexia internimarginata Rothschild, 1915
- Euplexia jabalsabira Hacker & Fibiger, 2002
- Euplexia japonica Leech, 1889
- Euplexia jordansi Draudt, 1950
- Euplexia koreaplexia Bryk, 1949
- Euplexia latibasalis Warren, 1913
- Euplexia likianga Kononenko, 1996
- Euplexia lilacina Hreblay & Ronkay, 1998
- Euplexia literata (Moore, 1882)
- Euplexia lucipara (Linnaeus, 1758) – small angle shades
- Euplexia lucisquama Warren, 1912
- Euplexia magniclavis (Hampson, 1898)
- Euplexia magnirena Warren, 1912
- Euplexia melanistis Hampson, 1908
- Euplexia melanocycla Hampson, 1908
- Euplexia mercieri Laporte, 1984
- Euplexia monilis (Moore, 1881)
- Euplexia morosa Walker, 1869
- Euplexia mucronata (Moore, 1881)
- Euplexia muscosa Warren, 1912
- Euplexia nigrina Draudt, 1950
- Euplexia nyassana Gaede, 1915
- Euplexia olivacea (Moore, 1881)
- Euplexia pali Hreblay & Ronkay, 1998
- Euplexia pardaria (Moore, 1882)
- Euplexia pericalles D. S. Fletcher, 1961
- Euplexia picturata (Leech, 1900)
- Euplexia pinoni Laporte, 1984
- Euplexia plumbeomarginata Hampson, 1895
- Euplexia poliochroa Hampson, 1908
- Euplexia polycmeta Turner, 1902
- Euplexia pratti (Bethune-Baker, 1906)
- Euplexia resplendens Warren, 1912
- Euplexia rhoda Hampson, 1908
- Euplexia semifascia (Walker, 1865)
- Euplexia shoana Laporte, 1984
- Euplexia sinuata Moore, 1882
- Euplexia splendida Sugi, 1958
- Euplexia tibetensis Warren, 1912
- Euplexia triplaga (Walker, 1857) (syn: Euplexia brillians Barnes & McDunnough, 1911)
- Euplexia venosa (Moore, 1882)
- Euplexia vetula Clarke, 1971
- Euplexia viridisparsa Berio, 1939
