= Eppa =

Eppa is a masculine given name which is borne by:

- Eppa Hunton I (1789–1830), American planter, militia officer and politician
- Eppa Hunton (1822–1908), American lawyer, politician and Confederate Civil War brigadier general, son of the above
- Eppa Hunton Jr. (1855–1932), American lawyer, railroad executive and politician, son of the above
- Eppa Hunton IV (1904–1976), American lawyer, son of the above
- Eppa Rixey (1891–1963), American Major League Baseball pitcher
