= European Practice Assessment =

The European Practice Assessment is a pan-European development for quality management in primary health care. The scaffolding is a set of indicators, that EPA instrument enables general practitioners to compare and to improve the organisation and management of their practices. It is based on an extended review of the international literature on assessment models for primary care, with special attention to the Dutch model of practice visits.

== Aims ==
EPA's key aspects of activity are the development and validation of a set of indicators and tools describing the organisational aspects of primary care practices. It was initiated in EQuiP, and the first set of indicators was developed through an international study by the EQuiP countries (2001–2004). Since 2005 it will be evaluated every three years. The intention of the EPA instrument as a quality management system is to allow management and organization of medical practices to be measured and evaluated at regional, national and international levels with an educational approach.

== History ==
Based on the TOPAS research project, the continuous development of EPA instruments started 2001. In autumn 2003 EPA as an instrument came into operation in nine countries.

Within a framework of an international project, the idea of an indicator-based instrument proved to give internationally valid, reliable and feasible results for quality improvement in primary health care. The following nine countries took part in the study and the further development: Belgium, France, Germany, Great Britain, the Netherlands, Switzerland, Slovenia, Austria and Israel.

== Practice ==
encouraged several organisations to establish the European Practice Assessment model as an offer for high quality practice management on a national base. From six European countries leading institutes with experience in research in quality of primary health care and practice visits collaborate in the European Practice Assessment project:

- Belgium: Flemish Institute of General Practice WWVH, Antwerp
- France: ANAES, Paris
- Germany: AQUA-Institute on Applied Quality Improvement and Research in Health Care, Göttingen
- Netherlands: Centre for Quality of Care Research WOK, University of Nijmegen/University Maastricht
- Switzerland: swisspep Institute for Quality and Research in Health Care, Gümlingen
- UK: Department of General Practice, University of Wales College of Medicine, Cardiff
- National Primary Care Research and Development Centre NPCRDC, Manchester

== See also ==
- EFQM European Foundation for Quality Management
- ISO 9000 The standards for Quality Management Systems from the International Organization for Standardization
