= International non-essential travel =

Legal terminology by the European Commission in light of the COVID-19 pandemic in 2020

The International non-essential travel (INET) policy is a legal terminology devised by the European Commission on 16 March 2020 in light of the COVID-19 pandemic. The INET policy is central to the Travel restrictions related to the COVID-19 pandemic.

== Synopsis ==
On 16 March 2020, the Commission adopted a Communication to the European Parliament, the European Council calling for a temporary Restriction on Non-Essential Travel to the EU in view of COVID19. The Commission sought to ensure that action taken at the EU's external borders was consistent and appropriate.

The Schengen Borders Code (SBC) allows its members to refuse entry to non-resident third-country nationals if they pose a so-called threat to public health. The SBC allows citizens and residents "for the purposes of returning to their homes" an exemption on restrictions.

The temporary restriction of non-essential travel should not apply to persons with an essential function or need, including:

- Healthcare professionals, health researchers, and elderly care professionals;
- Frontier workers;
- Seasonal workers in agriculture;
- Transport personnel;
- Diplomats, staff of international organisations, military personnel and humanitarian aid workers and civil protection personnel in the exercise of their functions;
- Passengers in transit;
- Passengers travelling for imperative family reasons;
- Persons in need of international protection or for other humanitarian reasons respecting the principle of nonrefoulement.
