= Thanatology =

Scientific study of death and its aspects

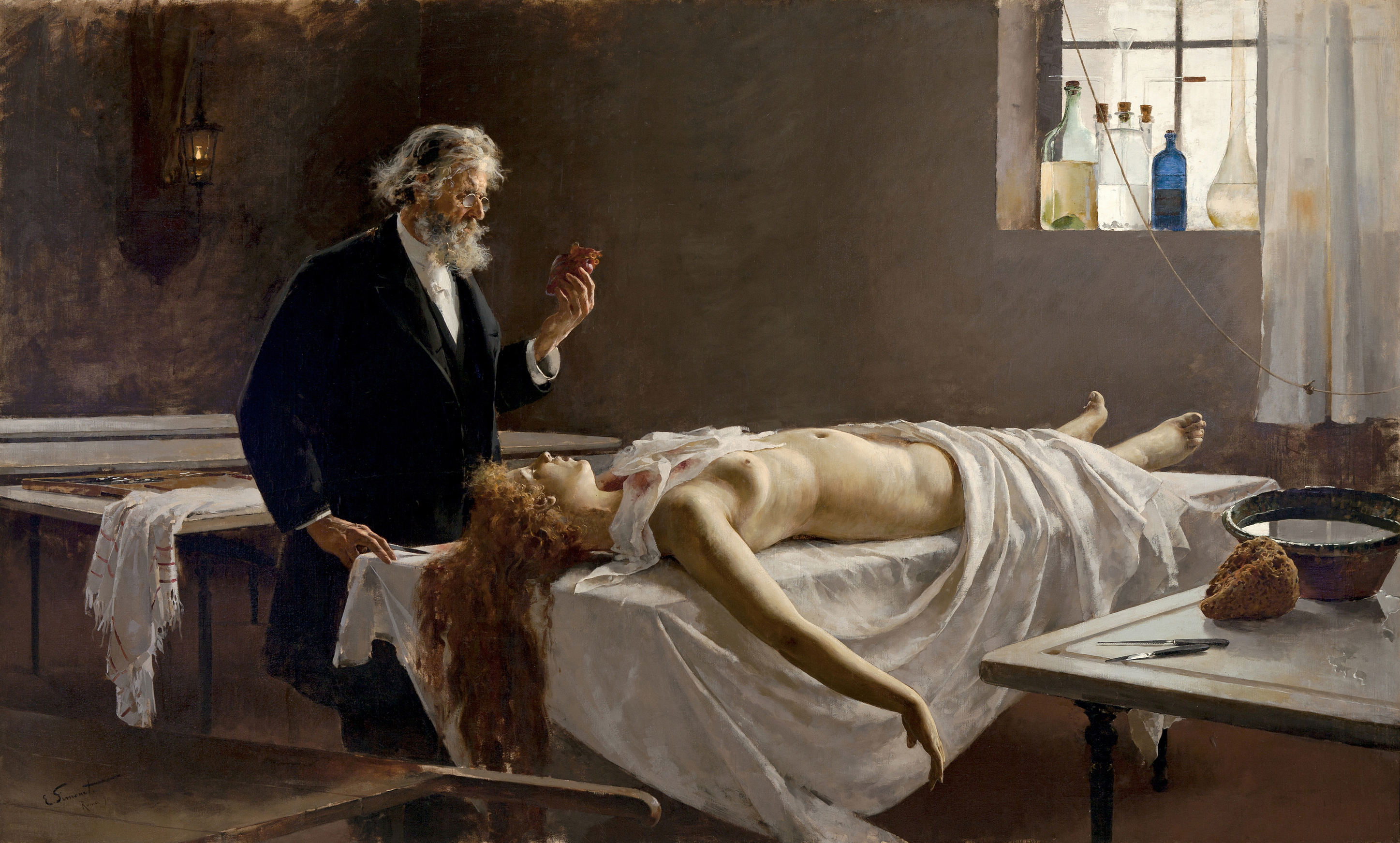
Autopsy (1890) by Enrique Simonet

Thanatology is "the description or study of death and dying and the psychological mechanisms of dealing with them." Those who describe themselves as practicing thanatology typically engage with the psychological and social aspects related to death. It is primarily an interdisciplinary study offered as a course of study at numerous colleges and universities.

The word is derived from the Greek language. In Greek mythology, Thanatos (θάνατος: "death") is the personification of death. The English suffix -ology derives from the Greek suffix -logia (-λογια: "speaking").

== History ==
Russian scientist Élie Metchnikoff pioneered the field of thanatology and was famous for his work in microbiology and the discovery of phagocytosis "Phagocytosis is the process by which a cell—often a phagocyte or protist—engulfs a solid particle to form an internal compartment known as a phagosome." In 1903, he established a scientific discipline devoted to the study of death. He argued that those who were dying had few or no resources for the experience of dying and that an academic study would help those facing death to have a better understanding of the phenomenon and reduce their fear of it.

Metchnikoff based his ideas for an interdisciplinary study on the fact that while medical students had their obligatory encounters with cadavers through anatomical studies, there was almost no instruction on how to care for the dying, nor was there any research into death included in the curriculum. Because few scholars and educators agreed with Metchnikoff, the support he needed for the realization of his suggestion did not materialize for decades.

Metchnikoff chose to focus on two new areas of study, gerontology and thanatology. Contrary to gerontology, it took about 47 years for most people to accept thanatology as a science. Therefore, the science of thanatology is fairly new for the most part. The altered viewpoints people developed when it came to viewing and coping with death was one reason that thanatology became more accepted across societies.

Thanatology arose with the 'Death with Dignity' movement of the early 1970s as an interdisciplinary category for the study of death.

Following World War II, the world was haunted with the memories of the many casualties. During this period of reflection, many existential philosophers began considering life-and-death issues. One in particular was Herman Feifel, an American psychologist who is considered the pioneer of the modern death movement. Feifel broke the taboo on discussions of death and dying with the publication of his book The Meaning of Death. In this book, Feifel dispelled myths held by scientists and practitioners about death and the denial of its importance for human behavior. It earned wide attention and became a classic in the new field, including as it did contributions from eminent thinkers such as psychiatrist Carl Jung, theologian Paul Tillich and philosopher Herbert Marcuse. Through The Meaning of Death, Feifel was able to lay the foundation for a field that would eventually be known as thanatology. The field was to improve death education and grief counseling by the use of valid death-related data, methodology, and theory.

However, this is only one of several important books in the field of thanatology. Other key texts include The Experience of Death by Paul-Louis Landsberg, the sections on temporality and death from Martin Heidegger's Being and Time, as well as works of a fictional nature, such as Leo Tolstoy's The Death of Ivan Ilyich and As I Lay Dying by William Faulkner.

== Goals ==
In most cases, thanatology is not specifically related to palliative care and end-of-life care, which aim to provide treatment for dying individuals and their families. According to the World Health Organization, "palliative care is an approach that improves the quality of life of patients and their families facing the problem associated with life-threatening illness, involving the 'treatment of pain and other problems, physical, psychosocial and spiritual.'"

Thanatology does not always directly explore the meaning of life and of death, though such questions are relevant to the psychological health of those involved in the dying process: individuals, families, communities, and cultures.

Thanatology has developed significantly and continues to adapt to understand death.

== Forensic medicine ==
Forensic medicine deals with, among many other things, sudden and unexpected deaths. According to one author: "Forensic medicine is the application of medical knowledge for the scientific investigation of facts and causal relationships, as well as the analysis and interpretation thereof in the service of the law in its broadest sense; moreover, it addresses all legal aspects of the practice of medicine during teaching, medical training, and specialist training." The process of postmortem autopsy, which originated and is well established in modern Europe, has not been adopted universally, however.

A large portion of a forensic physician's duty is to assist in inquiries into sudden and suspicious deaths and to examine individuals in connections with allegations of sexual offenses. They also provide expert evidence in court, but the notion that they represent individuals in court proceedings reveals a misconception of their role. Legal representation is invariably the province of legally qualified advocates and, in many jurisdictions, the right of audience as an advocate is confined by law to those so qualified.

Physicians' rules for forensic science: Any natural scientist who wishes to practice forensic science must obviously acquire forensic knowledge. Not all forensic scientists, however, have medical licenses, nor do medical practitioners have a monopoly in forensic science.

There are a handful of forensic doctors who work closely with prisoners to provide them with clinical assessments. They also put together care plans moving forward with these prisoners. These plans can include prescribing and obtaining medicine and monitoring them from a physical and mental health perspective.

== Coping with death ==
=== Research and studies ===
Multiple scholarly journals dedicated specifically to thanatology regularly publish peer-reviewed studies and essays of interest in the field. These include Death Studies, Mortality, Omega:Journal of Death & Dying, Journal of Loss & Trauma, and Illness, Crisis, & Loss. Though Elisabeth Kübler-Ross described Five Stages of Grief with terminal illness (denial, anger, bargaining, depression, and acceptance), some thanatologists disagree about the actual existence of such stages. Some reject the notion as simplistic and empirically unsupported. Dr. Allan Kellerhear pointed out that Kübler-Ross' stage theory was openly discussed and outlined as a heuristic device. He also went on to point out that she put the "stages" in inverted commas to emphasize their tentative nature in the only diagrammatic representation of these ideas in her book, "On Death & Dying."

Studies show that if one's self-esteem is already low, the death of one's partner may well result in greater social and emotional loneliness (concepts defined specifically by the researchers). Aggravated social and emotional loneliness, as thus defined, may result in a feeling of having received less support. However, since an imperfect grasp of these findings may lead to a garbled attempt to describe them, it is desirable to read them fully in their original sources so as to master them as thoroughly as one assimilates Kübler-Ross' theories of responses to loss.

Mortality awareness may be thought essential to our overall well-being as we confront the aging of world societies, global health disparities, emerging biomedical technologies, and shifting understandings of good deaths and lives worth living. However, we must be clear about what we mean by 'mortality awareness'. It is often said, and with some justification, that one phenomenon that distinguishes humans from other evolved beings is our acute awareness of our own mortality. If we mean no more than that we must know we must die in order to flourish, the assertion is facile since most humans are conscious of their mortality but we do not all rise equally well to existential or wider social challenges.

=== Hospice care ===
One way to cope with death is to utilize hospice care facilities. Hospice care of dying people is usually palliative rather than curative, and it may ease the suffering of the dying and those who care about them. The services provided in a hospice include: managing the dying individual's pain and symptoms; providing needed drugs, medical supplies and equipment; assisting the individual with emotional, psychological and spiritual aspects of dying; rendering services such as speech and physiotherapy where needed; and coaching family and friends on how to care for the individual.

A common myth about hospice care is that someone must be in their last few days of life, be bedridden or be unable to communicate with others to receive hospice help. However, that is simply not the case. Hospice care is appropriate for those who have been given a prognosis that they are likely to die within around 12 months or less. A decision to use hospice care means the dying individual will ideally spend more quality time with the people they love and have time to look back on life during this peaceful, meaningful period.

Another common myth is that hospice care means giving up hope. Hospice involves coping with death and part of that means acknowledging that some diseases, illnesses and states of being in their advanced stages cannot be cured. The idea of hope varies from person to person and, in hospice care, patients and their loved ones will often seek any form of hope that they can.

In places where there is little or no publicly funded provision for hospice care, various private insurance plans such as Medicare, Medicaid, and HMO will cover the costs, reducing the direct expense to the individual's family.

=== Popular media ===
Death and dying was the subject of the 2018 Academy Award-nominated Netflix short documentary, End Game about terminally ill patients in palliative care at a San Francisco hospital and subsequent Zen Hospice Project care. It featured palliative care physician, BJ Miller and was executive produced by palliative care activist Dr. Shoshana R. Ungerleider.

An episode of Quincy, M.E. titled "Gentle into That Good Night" (season 07 episode 07) featured a thanatologist by the name of Dr. Pendelton. During the episode Dr. Quincy explores the effect of death on people and his role in the grieving process.

In a 2016 open letter to singer David Bowie, palliative care doctor Professor Mark Tauber, M.D. talked about the importance of good end of life care, being able to express wishes about the last months of life, and good education about issues related to thanatology more generally. The letter went viral after being shared by Bowie's son, Duncan Jones and was subsequently read aloud by actor Benedict Cumberbatch and singer Jarvis Cocker at several public events.

The 2005 video game Pathologic features fictional thanatologist Daniil Dankovsky as a playable character. His quest to understand and cure death itself is his sole motivation for travelling to the town where the game is set. Once there, he intends to meet with and perhaps learn the secrets of a man who has lived an unnaturally long life.

== Fields of study ==
As an interdisciplinary study, thanatology relies on collaboration with many different fields of study. Death is a universal human concern; it has been examined and re-examined in a wide variety of disciplines, dating back to pre-history. Some of these fields of study are academic in nature; others have evolved throughout history as cultural traditions. One of the oldest organizations in the field of thanatology is the U.S.-based Association for Death Education and Counseling

The humanities are, perhaps, the very oldest disciplines to explore death. Historically, the average human had a significantly lower standard of living and lifespan than they would today. Wars, famine, and disease always kept death close at hand. Artists, authors, and poets often employed the universality of death as a motif in their works; this trend continues today.

The social sciences are often involved on both the individual and the cultural level. The individual level is primarily covered by psychology, the study of individual minds. However, to overlook social psychology would be a serious omission. Avoiding (or, in some cases, seeking) death is an important human motive; the fear of death affects many individuals' actions. That fear can be either reinforced or assuaged by social culture.

Social science research has frequently encountered the issue of death. Sociology, for instance, extends to but is by no means confined to social rules, conventions and practices. Sub-disciplines within sociology, such as the sociology of death and sociology of disaster, focus more narrowly on such issues as how societies handle death under certain conditions. Likewise, cultural anthropology and archeology are concerned with how various current and past cultures have each dealt with death. Society and culture are related but dissimilar concepts, so the scope of each is different. Thus, a society is an interdependent community, while societal as distinct from individual culture is an attribute of a community, including the complex web of shifting patterns that links some individuals together. In any case, both cultures and societies must deal with death; and various cultural studies (many of which overlap with each other) examine this response taking a variety of approaches.

Thanatology draws from the biological study of death, which explains what happens, physically, to individuals in the moment of dying and during after-death bodily changes such that extraneous events at the time of death and thereafter can be clarified. In psychiatry and clinical psychology, the medical application of psychological principles and therapeutic drugs is also involved; many licensed psychiatrists are required to take courses on thanatology during training. Medical ethics is also an important area of study, especially on the issue of euthanasia ('merciful killing') and assisted suicide. However, the degree to which any of these is an aspect of thanatology is a matter of opinion, depending primarily on how one defines thanatology itself.

There is also a branch of thanatology called music thanatology which focuses on the use of "music vigils" to help dying individuals, their families and friends. A vigil consists of one or a team of music thanatologists who visit the dying person. They play the harp most often but may play any gentle instrument like the guitar and sing based on changes that they observe in that person's physiology as well as in interpersonal family dynamics. The music tends toward the meditative and can be very helpful to the dying person and others present. Often, after a vigil, the dying person is more relaxed, less agitated, and in less pain. However, given the circumstances, reviews of the service by recipients (appreciative or otherwise) are few and far between. Some music thanatologists are certified by the Music Thanatology Association International, and they use the initials "CM-Th" to designate certification by this professional organization. A number of hospitals and hospices now have professional music thanatologists on their staff.

== See also ==
- Association for Death Education and Counseling
- Fascination with death
- Taboo against naming the dead
- Thanatopsis
- Thanatosensitivity
- Thanatos
- Archaeothanatology
