= Ungerleider =

Ungerleider is a surname. Notable people with the surname include:

- Howard Ungerleider (born 1968), American businessman
- Leslie Ungerleider (1946–2020), American experimental psychologist and neuroscientist
- Mór Ungerleider (1872–1955), Hungarian cafe owner and showman
- Shoshana R. Ungerleider, American doctor, journalist and film producer
- Steven Ungerleider (1949–2023), American sports psychologist, author, and documentary film producer
- Suzie Ungerleider, American-Canadian singer-songwriter
