= The Foundation for Global Sports Development =

American sports organization

Foundation for Global Sports Development
- Type: 501(c)3 Non-profit
- Legal status: Active
- Headquarters: Los Angeles, California
- Key people: David Ulich, president Steven Ungerleider, Vice President
- Website: globalsportsdevelopment.org

The Foundation for Global Sports Development is a 501(c) organization which creates and supports programs promoting sportsmanship, education, fair play and ethics for children around the world. Attorney David Ulich is president of the foundation and author and psychologist Steven Ungerleider is vice president of the board of the foundation.

== Projects ==
In 2015, the foundation pledged $75,000 to the International Paralympic Committee (IPC) in order to spread education and awareness about the IPC's efforts in the United States.

The foundation helped fund the film Munich ’72 and Beyond about the Munich massacre released in 2016, as well as a memorial to the 11 Israelis that were killed by terrorists at the 1972 Munich Olympics. The film has been nominated for an Emmy in the Outstanding Category of the 38th Annual News & Documentary Awards.

In April 2017, the foundation co-hosted a symposium on anti-doping issues in sport at Pepperdine University in Malibu. Sir Philip Craven, president of the International Paralympic Committee delivered the keynote speech.

== Youth programs ==
The Foundation for Global Sports Development founded the Playmakers Program which works with youth programs to bring kids to the Olympics. The program sent 50 at-risk kids that attended the Boys & Girls Clubs of San Francisco to the Vancouver Olympics in 2010. In 2012, the foundation worked with SOS Outreach to help a group of teens go to the Olympics in London through the Playmakers program. In 2016, 50 teens from the Denver area participated in a three day trip to the Olympic Training Center in Colorado Springs through the Playmakers program.

The foundation's team of champion ambassadors works with youths worldwide through mentorship programs and motivational speeches as well as podcasts and blogs. In 2016, Candace Cable, a Paralympian, was included on the team of champion ambassadors.

== Partnerships ==
The foundation partnered with the Agitos Foundation to support projects with National Paralympic Committees in 2015. In 2016, 49 coaches from 23 countries received training in the "Elite Para Powerlifting Coaching Course" supported by the Agitos Foundation and the Foundation for Global Sports Development in preparation for the Rio 2016 Paralympic Games.

Since 2013 the foundation has partnered with the World Curling Federation to present the Olympic Celebration Tour. This tour helps generate interest in the sport of curling by bringing an Olympic curler to member associations and curling clubs around the world.

== Recognition ==
The foundation established the Athletes in Excellence Award, which honors competing and retired athletes around the globe who have been leaders and champions in sport as well as in their communities. In 2015, the honor was awarded to 12 athletes around the world. The foundation awards the recognized athletes with a $10,000 unrestricted grant to further service and career goals.

The organization also gives a Humanitarian Award to leader and champions for social, economic, political or environmental justice and equality. In 2010, the award was given to Richard W. Pound, the founding chair of the World Anti-Doping Agency. The award went to Philip Craven the IPC president, in 2012. In 2014, the organization honored Arne Ljungqvist, the chairman of the medical commission of the International Olympic Committee (IOC) and former vice chairman of the World Anti-Doping Agency. In 2016, the award was given to Anita DeFrantz of the IOC.
