= Palliative care =

Area of healthcare that focuses on relieving and preventing suffering

Palliative medicine physician
Occupation
- Occupation type: Specialty
- Activity sectors: Medicine

Description
- Education required: Doctor of Medicine (M.D.); Doctor of Osteopathic medicine (D.O.); Bachelor of Medicine, Bachelor of Surgery (e.g., MBBS or MBChB); UK: Certificate of Completion of Specialist Training (4 years full-time)
- Fields of employment: Hospitals, clinics

Palliative care (from Latin root palliare "to cloak") is an interdisciplinary medical care-giving approach aimed at optimizing quality of life and mitigating or reducing suffering among people with serious, complex, and often terminal illnesses. Many definitions of palliative care exist.

The World Health Organization (WHO) describes palliative care as:

[A]n approach that improves the quality of life of patients and their families facing the problem associated with life-threatening illness, through the prevention and relief of suffering by means of early identification and impeccable assessment and treatment of pain and other problems, physical, psychosocial, and spiritual.

Since the 1990s, many palliative care programs involved a disease-specific approach. However, as the field developed throughout the 2000s, the WHO began to take a broader patient-centered approach, suggesting that the principles of palliative care should be applied as early as possible to any chronic, ultimately fatal illness. This shift was important because if a disease-oriented approach is followed, the needs and preferences of the patient are not fully met and aspects of care, such as pain, quality of life, and social support, as well as spiritual and emotional needs, fail to be addressed. Rather, a patient-centered model prioritizes relief of suffering and tailors care to increase the quality of life for terminally ill patients.

Palliative care is appropriate for individuals with serious/chronic illnesses across the age spectrum and can be provided as the main goal of care or in tandem with curative treatment. It is ideally provided by interdisciplinary teams which can include physicians, nurses, occupational and physical therapists, psychologists, social workers, chaplains, and dietitians. Palliative care can be provided in a variety of contexts, including but not limited to hospitals, outpatient clinics, and home settings. Although an important part of end-of-life care, palliative care is not limited to individuals nearing the end of life and can be helpful at any stage of a complex or chronic illness.

== Scope ==
Palliative care can improve healthcare quality in three sectors: Physical and emotional relief, strengthening of patient-physician communication and decision-making, and coordinated continuity of care across various healthcare settings, including hospital, home, and hospice. The overall goal of palliative care is to improve quality of life of individuals with serious illness, any life-threatening condition which either reduces an individual's daily function or quality of life or increases caregiver burden, through pain and symptom management, identification and support of caregiver needs, and care coordination. Palliative care can be delivered at any stage of illness alongside other treatments with curative or life-prolonging intent and is not restricted to people receiving end-of-life care.

Historically, palliative care services were focused on individuals with incurable cancer, but this framework is now applied to other diseases, including severe heart failure, chronic obstructive pulmonary disease, multiple sclerosis and other neurodegenerative conditions. Forty million people each year are expected to need palliative care, with approximately 78% of this population living in low and middle income countries. However, only 14% of this population can receive this kind of care, with a majority in high-income countries, making this an important sector to pay attention to.

Palliative care can be initiated in a variety of care settings, including emergency rooms, hospitals, hospice facilities, or at home. For some severe disease processes, medical specialty professional organizations recommend initiating palliative care at the time of diagnosis or when disease-directed options would not improve a patient's prognosis. For example, the American Society of Clinical Oncology recommends that patients with advanced cancer should be "referred to interdisciplinary palliative care teams that provide inpatient and outpatient care early in the course of disease, alongside active treatment of their cancer" within eight weeks of diagnosis.

Appropriately engaging palliative care providers as part of patient care improves overall symptom control, quality of life, and family satisfaction with care while reducing overall healthcare costs.

=== Palliative care versus hospice care ===
The distinction between palliative care and hospice differs depending on the global context. In the United States, the term hospice refers specifically to a benefit provided by the federal government since 1982. Hospice care services and palliative care programs share similar goals of mitigating unpleasant symptoms, controlling pain, optimizing comfort, and addressing psychological distress. Hospice care focuses on comfort and psychological support, and curative therapies are not pursued. Under the Medicare Hospice Benefit, individuals certified by two physicians to have less than six months to live (assuming a typical course) have access to specialized hospice services through various insurance programs (Medicare, Medicaid, and most health maintenance organizations and private insurers). An individual's hospice benefits are not revoked if that individual lives beyond six months. In the United States, to be eligible for hospice, patients usually forego treatments aimed at a cure, unless they are minors. This is to avoid concurrent care, where two different clinicians are billing for the same service. In 2016, a movement began to extend the reach of concurrent care to adults who were eligible for hospice but not yet emotionally prepared to forego curative treatments.

Outside the United States, the term hospice usually refers to a building or institution that specializes in palliative care. These institutions provide care to patients with end-of-life and palliative care needs. In the common vernacular outside the United States, hospice care and palliative care are synonymous and are not contingent on different avenues of funding. Over 40% of all dying patients in the United States currently undergo hospice care. Most of the hospice care occurs in the home environment during the last weeks/months of their lives. Of those patients, 86.6% believe their care is "excellent". Hospice's philosophy is that death is a part of life, so it is personal and unique. Caregivers are encouraged to discuss death with the patients and encourage spiritual exploration (if they so wish).

== History ==
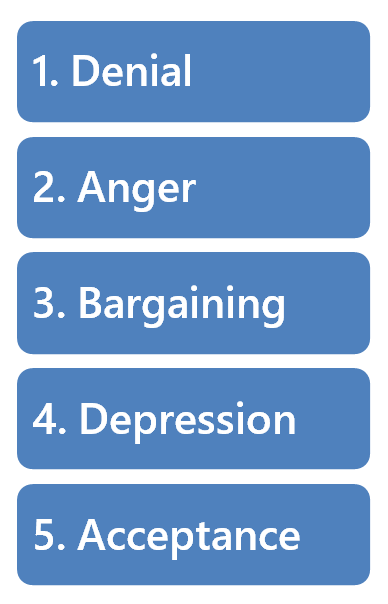
Kübler-Ross five stages of grief: denial, anger, bargaining, depression and acceptance.

The field of palliative care grew out of the hospice movement, which is commonly associated with Dame Cicely Saunders, who founded St. Christopher's Hospice for the terminally ill in 1967, and Elisabeth Kübler-Ross who published her seminal work "On Death and Dying" in 1969. In 1974, Balfour Mount coined the term "palliative care". and Paul Henteleff became the director of a new "terminal care" unit at Saint Boniface Hospital in Winnipeg. In 1987, Declan Walsh established a palliative medicine service at the Cleveland Clinic Cancer Center in Ohio which later expanded to become the training site of the first palliative care clinical and research fellowship as well as the first acute pain and palliative care inpatient unit in the United States. The program evolved into The Harry R. Horvitz Center for Palliative Medicine which was designated as an international demonstration project by the World Health Organization and accredited by the European Society for Medical Oncology as an Integrated Center of Oncology and Palliative Care.

Women have played a central role in the historical development of palliative care, particularly through their work in hospice settings, which helped expand services beyond oncology to encompass frail elderly patients. These contributions established the foundation for geriatric palliative care as a distinct and expanding domain of global health.

Advances in palliative care have since inspired a dramatic increase in hospital-based palliative care programs. Notable research outcomes forwarding the implementation of palliative care programs include:

- Evidence that hospital palliative care consult teams are associated with significant hospital and overall health system cost savings.
- Evidence that palliative care services increase the likelihood of dying at home and reduce symptom burden without impacting on caregiver grief among the vast majority of Americans who prefer to die at home.
- Evidence that providing palliative care in tandem with standard oncologic care among patients with advanced cancer is associated with lower rates of depression, increased quality of life, and increased length of survival compared to those receiving standard oncologic care and may even prolong survival.

Over 90% of US hospitals with more than 300 beds have palliative care teams, yet only 17% of rural hospitals with 50 or more beds have palliative care teams. Hospice and palliative medicine has been a board-certified sub-specialty of medicine in the United States since 2006. Additionally, in 2011, The Joint Commission began an Advanced Certification Program for Palliative Care that recognizes hospital inpatient programs demonstrating outstanding care and enhancement of the quality of life for people with serious illness.

== Practice of palliative care ==
Medications used in palliative care can be common medications, but used for a different indication based on established practices with varying degrees of evidence. Examples include the use of antipsychotic medications, anticonvulsants, and morphine. Routes of administration may differ from acute or chronic care, as many people in palliative care lose the ability to swallow. A common alternative route of administration is subcutaneous, as it is less traumatic and less difficult to maintain than intravenous medications. Other routes of administration include sublingual, intramuscular and transdermal. Medications are often managed at home by family or nursing support.

Palliative care interventions in care homes may lower discomfort for residents with dementia and improve family members' views of the quality of care. However, higher quality research is needed to support the benefits of these interventions for older people dying in these facilities.

High-certainty evidence supports the finding that implementation of home-based end-of-life care programs may increase the number of adults who will die at home and slightly improve patient satisfaction at a one-month follow-up. The impact of home-based end-of-life care on caregivers, healthcare staff, and health service costs is uncertain.

=== Pain, distress, and anxiety ===
For many patients, end-of-life care can cause emotional and psychological distress, contributing to their total suffering. An interdisciplinary palliative care team consisting of a mental health professional, social worker, counselor, as well as spiritual support such as a chaplain, can play important roles in helping people and their families cope using various methods such as counseling, visualization, cognitive methods, drug therapy and relaxation therapy to address their needs. Palliative pets can play a role in this last category.

Total pain

In the 1960s, hospice pioneer Cicely Saunders first introduced the term "total pain" to describe the heterogeneous nature of pain. This is the idea that a patient's experience of total pain has distinctive roots in the physical, psychological, social and spiritual realm but that they are all still closely linked to one another. Identifying the cause of pain can guide care for some patients and improve their quality of life.

==== Physical pain ====
Physical pain can be managed using pain medications as long as they do not put the patient at further risk for developing or increasing medical diagnoses such as heart problems or difficulty breathing. Patients at the end of life can exhibit many physical symptoms that can cause extreme pain such as dyspnea (or difficulty breathing), coughing, xerostomia (dry mouth), nausea and vomiting, constipation, fever, delirium, and excessive oral and pharyngeal secretions ("Death Rattle"). Radiation is commonly used with palliative intent to alleviate pain in patients with cancer. As an effect from radiation may take days to weeks to occur, patients dying a short time following their treatment are unlikely to receive benefit.

==== Psychosocial pain and anxiety ====
Once the immediate physical pain has been addressed, identifying the distressing factors in a patient's life, aside from pain, can help them be more comfortable.

When a patient's needs are met, then they are more likely to be open to the idea of hospice or treatments outside comfort care. Having a psychosocial assessment allows the medical team to facilitate a healthy patient-family understanding of adjustment, coping, and support. This communication between the medical team and the patients and family can also help facilitate discussions on the process of maintaining and enhancing relationships, finding meaning in the dying process, and achieving a sense of control while confronting and preparing for death. For adults with anxiety, medical evidence in the form of high-quality randomized trials is insufficient to determine the most effective treatment approach to reduce the symptoms of anxiety.

==== Spirituality ====
Among spiritual persons, spirituality is typically considered a fundamental component of palliative care. Hospice facilities with palliative care programs usually have available chaplains.

According to the Clinical Practice Guidelines for Quality Palliative Care, spirituality is a "dynamic and intrinsic aspect of humanity" and has been associated with "an improved quality of life for those with chronic and serious illness", especially for patients who are living with incurable and advanced illnesses of a chronic nature. Spiritual beliefs and practices can influence perceptions of pain and distress, as well as quality of life among advanced cancer patients. Spiritual needs are often described in literature as including loving/being loved, forgiveness, and deciphering the meaning of life.

Most spiritual interventions are subjective and complex. Many have not been well evaluated for their effectiveness; tools can be used to measure and implement effective spiritual care.

==== Nausea and vomiting ====
Nausea and vomiting are common in people who have advanced terminal illness and can cause distress. Several pharmacologic antiemetic options are suggested to help alleviate these symptoms. For people who do not respond to first-line medications, levomepromazine may be used; there have been insufficient clinical trials to assess the effectiveness of this medication. Haloperidol and droperidol are other medications that are sometimes prescribed to help alleviate nausea and vomiting. Further research is also required to understand the effectiveness of these medications.

==== Hydration and nutrition ====
Many terminally ill people cannot consume adequate food or drink. Providing medically assisted food or drink to prolong life and improve the quality of life is common; there have been few high-quality studies to determine best practices and the effectiveness of these approaches.

==== Symptom assessment ====
One instrument used in palliative care is the Edmonton Symptom Assessment Scale (ESAS), which consists of eight visual analog scales (VAS) ranging from 0–10, indicating the levels of pain, activity, nausea, depression, anxiety, drowsiness, appetite, sensation of well-being, and sometimes shortness of breath. A score of 0 indicates absence of the symptom, and a score of 10 indicates the worst possible severity. The instrument can be completed by the patient, with or without assistance, or by nurses and relatives.

=== Pediatric palliative care ===
Pediatric palliative care is family-centered, specialized medical care for children with serious illnesses that focuses on mitigating the physical, emotional, psychosocial, and spiritual suffering associated with illness to ultimately optimize quality of life.

Pediatric palliative care practitioners receive specialized training in family-centered, developmental and age-appropriate skills in communication and facilitation of shared decision making; assessment and management of pain and distressing symptoms; advanced knowledge in care coordination of multidisciplinary pediatric caregiving medical teams; referral to hospital and ambulatory resources available to patients and families; and psychologically supporting children and families through illness and bereavement.

==== Symptoms assessment and management of children ====
As with palliative care for adults, symptom assessment and management are critical components of pediatric palliative care as it improves quality of life, give children and families a sense of control, and prolong life in some cases. The general approach to assessment and management of distressing symptoms in children by a palliative care team is as follows:

- Identify and assess symptoms through history taking (focusing on location, quality, time course, as well as exacerbating and mitigating stimuli). Symptom assessment in children is uniquely challenging due to communication barriers, depending on the child's ability to identify and communicate about symptoms. Thus, both the child and caregivers should provide the clinical history. With this said, children as young as four years of age can indicate the location and severity of pain through visual mapping techniques and metaphors.
- Perform a thorough exam of the child. Special attention to the child's behavioral response to exam components, particularly regarding potentially painful stimuli. A commonly held myth is that premature and neonatal infants do not experience pain due to their immature pain pathways. Research demonstrates that pain perception in these age groups is equal to or greater than that of adults. With this said, some children experiencing intolerable pain present with 'psychomotor inertia', a phenomenon where a child in severe chronic pain presents overly well behaved or depressed. These patients demonstrate behavioral responses consistent with pain relief when titrated with morphine. Finally, because children behaviorally respond to pain atypically, a playing or sleeping child should not be assumed to be without pain.
- Identify the place of treatment (tertiary versus local hospital, intensive care unit, home, hospice, etc.).
- Anticipate symptoms based on the typical disease course of the hypothesized diagnosis.
- Present treatment options to the family proactively, based on care options and resources available in each of the aforementioned care settings. Ensuing management should anticipate transitions of palliative care settings to afford seamless continuity of service provision across health, education, and social care settings.
- Consider both pharmacologic and non-pharmacologic treatment modalities (education and mental health support, administration of hot and cold packs, massage, play therapy, distraction therapy, hypnotherapy, physical therapy, occupational therapy, and complementary therapies) when addressing distressing symptoms. Respite care is an additional practice that can further aid in alleviating the physical and mental pain of the child and their family. By allowing the caregiving to be provided by other qualified individuals, it allows the family time to rest and renew themselves
- Assess how the child perceives their symptoms (based on personal views) to create individualized care plans.
- After the implementation of therapeutic interventions, involve both the child and family in the reassessment of symptoms.

The most common symptoms in children with severe chronic disease appropriate for palliative care consultation are weakness, fatigue, pain, poor appetite, weight loss, agitation, lack of mobility, shortness of breath, nausea and vomiting, constipation, sadness or depression, drowsiness, difficulty with speech, headache, excess secretions, anemia, pressure area problems, anxiety, fever, and mouth sores. The most common end of life symptoms in children include shortness of breath, cough, fatigue, pain, nausea and vomiting, agitation and anxiety, poor concentration, skin lesions, swelling of the extremities, seizures, poor appetite, difficulty with feeding, and diarrhea. In older children with neurologic and neuromuscular manifestations of disease, there is a high burden of anxiety and depression that correlates with disease progression, increasing disability, and greater dependence on carers. From the caregiver's perspective, families find changes in behavior, reported pain, lack of appetite, changes in appearance, talking to God or angels, breathing changes, weakness, and fatigue to be the most distressing symptoms to witness in their loved ones.

As discussed above, within adult palliative medicine, providers frequently use validated symptom assessment tools, but these tools lack essential aspects of children's symptom experience. Within pediatrics, there is not a comprehensive symptoms assessment widely employed. A few symptoms assessment tools trialed among older children receiving palliative care include the Symptom Distress Scale, and the Memorial Symptom Assessment Scale, and Childhood Cancer Stressors Inventory. Quality of life considerations within pediatrics are unique and an important component of symptoms assessment. The Pediatric Cancer Quality of Life Inventory-32 (PCQL-32) is a standardized parent-proxy report that assesses cancer treatment-related symptoms (focusing mainly on pain and nausea). But again, this tool does not comprehensively assess all palliative symptom issues. Symptom assessment tools for younger age groups are rarely utilized as they have limited value, especially for infants and young children who are not at a developmental stage where they can articulate symptoms.

==== Communication with children and families ====
Within the realm of pediatric medical care, the palliative care team is tasked with facilitating family-centered communication with children and their families, as well as multidisciplinary pediatric caregiving medical teams to forward coordinated medical management and the child's quality of life. Strategies for communication are complex as the pediatric palliative care practitioners must facilitate a shared understanding of and consensus for goals of care and therapies available to the sick child amongst multiple medical teams who often have different areas of expertise. Additionally, pediatric palliative care practitioners must assess both the sick child and their family's understanding of complex illness and care options, and provide accessible, thoughtful education to address knowledge gaps and allow for informed decision making. Finally, practitioners are supporting children and families in the queries, emotional distress, and decision-making that ensues from the child's illness.

Many frameworks for communication have been established in the medical literature, but the field of pediatric palliative care is still in relative infancy. Communication considerations and strategies employed in a palliative setting include:

- Developing supportive relationships with patients and families. An essential component of a provider's ability to provide individualized palliative care is their ability to obtain an intimate understanding of the child and family's preferences and overall character. On initial consultation, palliative care providers often focus on affirming a caring relationship with the pediatric patient and their family by first asking the child how they would describe themself and what is important to them, communicating in an age and developmentally cognizant fashion. The provider may then gather similar information from the child's caregivers. Questions practitioners may ask include 'What does the child enjoy doing? What do they most dislike doing? What does a typical day look like for the child?' Other topics potentially addressed by the palliative care provider may also include familial rituals as well as spiritual and religious beliefs, life goals for the child, and the meaning of illness within the broader context of the child and their family's life.
- Developing a shared understanding of the child's condition with the patient and their family. The establishment of shared knowledge between medical providers, patients, and families is essential when determining palliative goals of care for pediatric patients. Initially, practitioners often elicit information from the patient and child to ascertain these parties' baseline understanding of the child's situation. Assessing for baseline knowledge allows the palliative care provider to identify knowledge gaps and provide education on those topics. Through this process, families can pursue informed, shared medical decision-making regarding their child's care. A framework often employed by pediatric palliative care providers is 'ask, tell, ask' where the provider asks the patient and their family for a question to identify their level of comprehension of the situation, and then subsequently supplements the family's knowledge with additional expert knowledge. This information is often conveyed without jargon or euphemism to maintain trust and ensure understanding. Providers iteratively check for comprehension of this knowledge supplementation by asking questions related to previous explanations, as information retention can be challenging when undergoing a stressful experience.
- Establishing meaning and dignity regarding the child's illness. As part of developing a shared understanding of a child's illness and character, palliative providers will assess both the child and their family's symbolic and emotional relationship to the disease. As both the somatic and psychological implications of illness can be distressing to children, palliative care practitioners look for opportunities to establish meaning and dignity regarding the child's illness by contextualizing the disease within a broader framework of the child's life. Derived from the fields of dignity therapy and meaning-centered psychotherapy, the palliative care provider may explore the following questions with the sick child and their family:
  - What gives your life meaning, worth, or purpose?
  - Where do you find strength and support?
  - What inspires you?
  - How do you like to be thought of?
  - What are you most proud of?
  - What are the particular things you would like your family to know or remember about you?
  - When was the last time you laughed really hard?
  - Are you frightened by all of this? What, in particular, are you most frightened of?
  - What is the meaning of this (illness) experience for you? Do you ever think about why this happened to you?
- Assessing preferences for decision making. Medical decision-making in a pediatric setting is unique in that it is often the child's legal guardians, not the patient, who ultimately consent for most medical treatments. Yet within a palliative care setting, it is particularly consequential to incorporate the child's preferences within the ultimate goals of care. Equally important to consider, families may vary in the level of responsibility they want in this decision-making process. Their preference may range from wanting to be the child's sole decision makers, to partnering with the medical team in a shared decision-making model, to advocating for full deferral of decision-making responsibility to the clinician. Palliative care providers clarify a family's preferences and support needs for medical decision making by providing context, information, and options for treatment and medical palliation. In the case of critically ill babies, parents can participate more in decision-making if they are presented with options to be discussed rather than recommendations by the doctor. Utilizing this style of communication also leads to less conflict with doctors and might help the parents cope better with the eventual outcomes.
- Optimizing the environment for effective conversations around prognosis and goals of care. Essential to facilitating supportive, clear communication around potentially distressing topics such as prognosis and goals of care for seriously ill pediatric patients is optimizing the setting where this communication will take place and developing informed consensus among the child's caregiving team regarding goals and options for care. Often, these conversations occur within the context of family meetings, which are formal meetings between families and the child's multidisciplinary medical team. Before the family meeting, providers often meet to discuss the child's overall case, reasonably expected prognosis, and options for care, in addition to clarifying specific roles each provider will take on during the family meeting. During this meeting, the multidisciplinary medical team may also discuss any legal or ethical considerations related to the case. Palliative care providers often facilitate this meeting and help synthesize its outcome for children and their families. Experts in optimized communication, palliative care providers may opt to hold the family meeting in a quiet space where the providers and family can sit and address concerns during a time when all parties are not constrained. Additionally, parents' preferences regarding information exchange with the sick child present should be clarified. If the child's guardians are resistant to disclosing information in front of their child, the child's provider may explore parental concerns on the topic. When excluded from family meetings and moments of challenging information exchange, adolescents, in particular, may have challenges with trusting their medical providers if they feel critical information is being withheld. It is important to follow the child's lead when deciding whether to disclose difficult information. Additionally, including them in these conversations can help the child fully participate in their care and medical decision-making. Finally, it is important to prioritize the family's agenda while additionally considering any urgent medical decisions needed to advance the child's care.
- Supporting emotional distress. A significant role of the pediatric palliative care provider is to help support children, their families, and their caregiving teams through the emotional stress of illness. Communication strategies the palliative care provider may employ in this role are asking for permission when engaging with potentially distressing conversations, naming emotions witnessed to create opportunities to discuss complex emotional responses to illness, actively listening, and allowing for invitational silence. The palliative care provider may iteratively assess the child and family's emotional responses and needs during challenging conversations. At times, the medical team may be hesitant to discuss a child's prognosis out of fear of increasing distress. This sentiment is not supported by the literature; among adults, end-of-life discussions are not associated with increased rates of anxiety or depression. Though this topic is not well studied in pediatric populations, conversations about prognosis have the potential to increase in parental hope and peace of mind.
- SPIKE framework. This is a framework that is designed to assist healthcare workers in delivering bad news. The acronym stands for: setting, perception, invitation, knowledge, empathy, and summarize/strategy. When delivering bad news, it is important to consider the setting, including the environment in which the healthcare provider delivers the news. This includes privacy, seating, time, and family members. What to say should also be considered, as well as rehearsed. It is important to understand how a patient is receiving the information by asking open-ended questions and asking them to repeat what they learned in their own words, which is the perception aspect of the framework. The healthcare provider should seek the patient's permission to disclose additional information before doing so to prevent overwhelming or distressing the patient. To ensure the patient understands what is being told, knowledge must be used. This includes speaking in a way the patient will understand, using simple words, not being excessively blunt, providing information in small chunks, checking in with the patient to confirm they understand, and not providing incomplete or inaccurate information. To alleviate some of a patient's distress, it is crucial to be empathetic in the sense of understanding how a patient is feeling and the reactions they are having. This can allow one to change how they are delivering information, give the patient time to process, or console them if needed. Connecting with patients is an important step in delivering bad news; maintaining eye contact shows that the healthcare provider is present and that the patient and family have their full attention. Furthermore, the provider may make a connection by touching the patient's shoulder or hand, giving them a physical connection to show that they are not alone. Finally, it is important to summarize all the information given to ensure the patient fully understands and takes away the major points. Additionally, patients with a clear plan for the future are less likely to feel anxious and uncertain. It is important to ask people if they are ready for that information before providing it.

=== Geriatric palliative care ===
==== Overview ====
With the transition in the population toward lower child mortality and lower death rates, countries around the world are seeing larger elderly populations. In some countries, this means a growing burden on national resources in the shape of social security and health care payments. As aging populations put increasing pressure on existing resources, long-term palliative care for patients' non-communicable, chronic conditions has emerged as a necessary approach to increase these patients' quality of life, through prevention and relief by identifying, assessing, and treating the source of pain and other psychosocial and spiritual problems.

The global rise in life expectancy and the aging of populations have increased the need for palliative approaches in geriatric medicine. Older adults frequently experience multiple chronic illnesses, frailty, and cognitive decline, resulting in complex care needs that extend beyond disease-specific treatments. Geriatric palliative care addresses physical, psychosocial, and spiritual suffering in this population, emphasizing quality of life, autonomy, and dignity during the final stages of life. Expanding access remains challenging due to uneven resource distribution, shortages of trained professionals, and limited policy prioritization.

==== Distinct challenges in older populations ====
Prognostication in older adults is often uncertain due to multi-morbidity and gradual functional decline, complicating the timing of palliative interventions. Care delivery is further challenged by fragmented health and social care systems, where reimbursement models frequently favor acute interventions over longitudinal, supportive care. These structural issues contribute to delayed referrals and underutilization of palliative services in older populations.

==== Integration into healthcare systems ====
Efforts to better integrate palliative care into geriatric medicine have expanded since the formal recognition of palliative care by the World Health Organization (WHO) in 1990, with emerging models emphasizing early incorporation of palliative principles into routine care for older adults. In countries such as Germany and the Netherlands, specialized geriatric palliative care programs have been established to bridge hospital, nursing home, and community-based care settings.

Research indicates that embedding palliative care into geriatrics improves patient satisfaction, reduces unnecessary hospitalizations, and enhances the quality of end-of-life experiences. This has led professional societies, including the European Association for Palliative Care (EAPC) and the American Geriatrics Society (AGS), to call for systematic integration of palliative frameworks into geriatric training and practice.

==== Policy frameworks and global perspectives ====
Policy initiatives around geriatric palliative care vary widely across countries. In some European nations, palliative care is formally embedded into national aging strategies, while in others, services remain fragmented and underfunded. The WHO has called for universal access to palliative care, highlighting disparities in access for older adults worldwide.

Cross-national comparisons show significant differences in implementation. High-income countries such as the United Kingdom and Canada have more established frameworks like the Ambitions for Palliative and End of Life Care, which includes funding mechanisms supporting interdisciplinary geriatric palliative care teams. In contrast, low- and middle-income countries face persistent challenges including workforce shortages, limited opioid availability, and minimal policy support, leading to widespread unmet need among older populations.

==== Economic considerations and evaluations in geriatric palliative care ====
The economics of geriatric palliative care have become increasingly important as healthcare systems confront the financial implications of population aging. Older adults account for a disproportionate share of medical expenditures in their final years, much of it directed toward aggressive treatments with limited benefit. Understanding how palliative care influences both cost and patient outcomes is central to effective policy and resource allocation.

===== Challenges in economic evaluation =====
Economic evaluations in palliative and end-of-life care face methodological challenges distinct from those in curative medicine. Common issues include narrow cost perspectives, short time horizons, difficulties defining control groups, and limited generalizability across settings. These obstacles are amplified in geriatric settings, where multi-morbidity, frailty, and variable trajectories complicate the definition of intervention and control groups.

The standard use of Quality-Adjusted Life Years (QALYs) in cost-effectiveness analysis has also been debated. Traditional QALY instruments, such as the EQ-5D, may overlook domains central to palliative care, including dignity, existential well-being, and symptom burden. To address this, researchers have proposed modifying time valuations and incorporating domain-specific or capability-based measures such as ICECAP-SCM to capture end-of-life quality better.

===== Evidence on cost and value =====
Growing empirical evidence supports that palliative care can reduce costs or yield cost offsets, especially in acute care settings. A large meta-analysis of hospital palliative care consultations estimated an average reduction in direct hospital costs of USD 3,237 per patient, with greater savings in cancer cases and those with multiple comorbidities. A narrative review likewise reported that home-based palliative care consistently lowers hospitalization rates and emergency visits, although many studies measure cost outcomes alone and omit formal cost-utility analyses.

Community and home-based models demonstrate similar economic advantages. These care avenues have been associated with lower hospitalization rates and improved patient satisfaction. A multi-country economic evaluation reported that early integration of palliative services into primary and long-term care improved cost efficiency without compromising patient outcomes.(CITE) Modeling studies suggest that scaling community-based programs for older adults could reduce national health expenditures by up to 15 percent over a decade, primarily through reduced acute care utilization and improved coordination of chronic care.

===== Remaining research gaps =====
Despite these findings, the literature remains limited by short time horizons, a narrow healthcare system perspective, and a lack of standardized outcome measures. Few evaluations consider caregiver burden or broader societal costs. Scholars have called for a coordinated research agenda that strengthens the evidence base for geriatric palliative care economics and ensures models balance efficiency with dignity and quality at the end of life

== Ethics ==
End-of-life ethics refers to the moral principles and considerations that guide decisions and actions related to the care of individuals who are terminally ill or approaching the end of their lives. This field of ethics addresses the complex issues that arise when medical, emotional, and personal values intersect, often requiring difficult decisions about life-sustaining treatments, palliative care, and the quality of life.

== In religions ==
The doctrine of the Catholic Church accepts and supports the use of palliative care. Many of the largest religions in the world likewise endorse the practice.

== In society ==
=== Certification and training for services ===
In most countries, hospice care and palliative care are provided by an interdisciplinary team consisting of physicians, pharmacists, nurses, nursing assistants, social workers, chaplains, and caregivers. In some countries, additional members of the team may include certified nursing assistants and home healthcare aides, as well as volunteers from the community (largely untrained but some being skilled medical personnel), and housekeepers.

In the United Kingdom, Palliative Medicine specialist training is delivered alongside Internal Medicine stage two training over an indicative four years. Entry into Palliative medicine training is possible following successful completion of both a foundation programme and a core training programme. There are two core training programmes for Palliative Medicine training:

- Internal Medical Training (IMT)
- Acute Care Common Stem - Internal Medicine (ACCS-IM)

In the United States, the physician sub-specialty of hospice and palliative medicine was established in 2006 to provide expertise in the care of people with life-limiting, advanced disease, and catastrophic injury; the relief of distressing symptoms; the coordination of interdisciplinary care in diverse settings; the use of specialized care systems including hospice; the management of the imminently dying patient; and legal and ethical decision making in end of life care.

Caregivers, both family and volunteers, are crucial to the palliative care system. Caregivers and people being treated often form lasting friendships over the course of care. As a consequence, caregivers may find themselves under severe emotional and physical strain. Opportunities for caregiver respite are some of the services hospices provide to promote caregiver well-being. Respite may last a few hours up to several days (the latter being done by placing the primary person being cared for in a nursing home or inpatient hospice unit for several days).

In the US, board certification for physicians in palliative care was through the American Board of Hospice and Palliative Medicine; recently, this was changed to be done through any of 11 different speciality boards through an American Board of Medical Specialties-approved procedure. Additionally, board certification is available to osteopathic physicians (D.O.) in the United States through four medical specialty boards through an American Osteopathic Association Bureau of Osteopathic Specialists-approved procedure. More than 50 fellowship programs provide one to two years of specialty training following a primary residency. In the United Kingdom palliative care has been a full speciality of medicine since 1989, and training is governed by the same regulations through the Royal College of Physicians as with any other medical speciality. Nurses, in the United States and internationally, can receive continuing education credits through Palliative Care specific trainings, such as those offered by End-of-Life Nursing Education Consortium (ELNEC).

The Tata Memorial Centre in Mumbai has offered a physician's course in palliative medicine since 2012, the first one of its kind in the country.

=== Regional variation in services ===
In the United States, hospice and palliative care represent two different aspects of care with similar philosophies, but with different payment systems and locations of service. Palliative care services are most often provided in acute care hospitals organized around an interdisciplinary consultation service, with or without an acute inpatient palliative care unit. Palliative care may also be provided in the dying person's home as a "bridge" program between traditional US home care services and hospice care or provided in long-term care facilities. In contrast over 80% of hospice care in the US is provided at home with the remainder provided to people in long-term care facilities or in free standing hospice residential facilities. In the UK, a hospice is seen as part of the speciality of palliative care, and no distinction is made between 'hospice' and 'palliative care'.

In the UK, palliative care services offer inpatient care, home care, day care, and outpatient services, and work in close partnership with mainstream services. Hospices often house a full range of services and professionals for children and adults. In 2015 the UK's palliative care was ranked as the best in the world "due to comprehensive national policies, the extensive integration of palliative care into the National Health Service, a strong hospice movement, and deep community engagement on the issue".

In 2021, the UK's National Palliative and End of Life Care Partnership published its six ambitions for 2021–26. These include fair access to end of life care for everyone regardless of who they are, where they live, or their circumstances, and the need to maximise comfort and wellbeing. Informed and timely conversations are also highlighted.

=== Acceptance and access ===
The focus on a person's quality of life has increased greatly since the 1990s. In the United States today, 55% of hospitals with more than 100 beds offer a palliative-care program, and nearly one-fifth of community hospitals have palliative-care programs. A relatively recent development is the palliative-care team, a dedicated health care team that is entirely geared toward palliative treatment.

Physicians practicing palliative care do not always receive support from the people they are treating, family members, healthcare professionals, or their social peers. More than half of physicians in one survey reported that they have had at least one experience where a patient's family members, another physician, or another health care professional had characterized their work as being "euthanasia, murder, or killing" during the last five years. A quarter of them had received similar comments from their own friends or family members, or from a patient.

Despite significant progress that has been made to increase access to palliative care within the United States and other countries, many countries have not yet considered palliative care as a public health problem, and therefore do not include it in their public health agenda. Resources and cultural attitudes both play significant roles in the acceptance and implementation of palliative care in the health care agenda. A study identified the current gaps in palliative care for people with severe mental illness (SMI's). They found that due to the lack of resources within both mental health and end of life services, people with SMI's faced several barriers to accessing timely and appropriate palliative care. They called for a multidisciplinary team approach, including advocacy, with a point of contact coordinating the appropriate support for the individual. They also state that end-of-life and mental health care need to be included in professional training.

A review states that by restricting referrals to palliative care only when patients have a definitive timeline for death, something that the study found to be often inaccurate, can have negative implications for the patient, both when accessing end of life care, or being unable to access services due to not receiving a timeline from medical professionals. The authors call for a less rigid approach to referrals to palliative care services to support the individual better, improve the quality of life remaining, and provide more holistic care.

Many people with chronic pain are stigmatized and treated as opioid addicts. Patients can build a tolerance to drugs and have to take more and more to manage their pain. The symptoms of chronic pain patients do not show up on scans, so the doctor must go off trust alone. This is the reason that some wait to consult their doctor and endure sometimes years of pain before seeking help.

==== Disparities in access ====
Access to palliative care is not distributed equally across populations, with disparities observed based on race, ethnicity, and socioeconomic status. Research has shown that marginalized groups are less likely to receive timely and comprehensive palliative care services, leading to differences in end-of-life experiences. These disparities stem from structural inequality in healthcare, financial barriers, cultural differences, and societal racism within medical institutions. Disparities in palliative care may also be influenced by provider-patient racial discordance, as studies suggest that increasing racial and ethnic concordance between patients and healthcare providers could improve trust, shared decision-making, and end-of-life care outcomes.

===== Racial and ethnic disparities =====
Studies have found that racial and ethnic minorities, particularly Black, Hispanic, and Indigenous populations, have lower access to palliative care compared to White patients. Non-Hispanic Black individuals, for example, are significantly less likely to enroll in hospice services or complete advance care planning documents, which can lead to more aggressive medical interventions at the end of life rather than comfort-focused care. Contributing factors include mistrust of the medical system, differences in communication about end-of-life care, and provider biases that may affect the type of recommendations given to minority patients.

===== Socioeconomic disparities =====
Lower-income individuals are less likely to receive palliative care services, often facing greater barriers due to financial constraints, lack of insurance coverage, and limited healthcare infrastructure in low-income and rural areas. Those living in poverty have higher rates of unmanaged symptoms and may be more likely to receive care in emergency settings rather than through specialized palliative care programs. Economic disparities in healthcare access contribute to differing end-of-life experiences, with wealthier individuals more likely to receive personalized, home-based palliative care services.

== In media ==
Palliative care was the subject of the 2018 Netflix short documentary, End Game by directors Rob Epstein and Jeffrey Friedman about terminally ill patients in a San Francisco hospital and features the work of palliative care physician, BJ Miller. The film's executive producers were Steven Ungerleider, David C. Ulich and Shoshana R. Ungerleider.

In 2016, an open letter to the singer David Bowie written by a palliative care doctor, Professor Mark Taubert, talked about the importance of good palliative care, being able to express wishes about the last months of life, and education about end of life care generally. The letter went viral after David Bowie's son Duncan Jones shared it. The letter was subsequently read out by the actor Benedict Cumberbatch and the singer Jarvis Cocker at public events.

== Research ==
Research funded by the UK's National Institute for Health and Care Research (NIHR) has addressed these areas of need. Examples highlight inequalities faced by several groups and offer recommendations. These include the need for close partnership between services caring for people with severe mental illness, improved understanding of barriers faced by Gypsy, Traveller and Roma communities, the provision of flexible palliative care services for children from ethnic minorities or deprived areas.

Other research suggests that giving nurses and pharmacists easier access to electronic patient records about prescribing could help people manage their symptoms at home. A named professional to support and guide patients and carers through the healthcare system could also improve the experience of care at home at the end of life. A synthesised review looking at palliative care in the UK created a resource showing which services were available and grouped them according to their intended purpose and benefit to the patient. They also stated that currently in the UK, palliative services are only available to patients with a timeline to death, usually 12 months or less. They found these timelines to be often inaccurate and created barriers to patients accessing appropriate services. They call for a more holistic approach to end of life care which is not restricted by arbitrary timelines.

== Film ==
The film Le Dernier Souffle (2024), directed by Costa-Gavras, approaches the sensitive subject of palliative care.

== See also ==
- Futile medical care
- Health Advocate
- Health care reform
- Health insurance
- Health Insurance Innovations
