= Last Train =

The Last Train may refer to:

== Film and television ==
- The Last Train (2002 film), a Uruguayan and Argentinian comedy-drama film
- The Last Train (2006 film), a German drama
- The Last Train (TV series), a 1999 British, six-part, post-apocalyptic television drama series
- The Last Train, winner of the 2003 Thessaloniki International Film Festival

== Other uses ==
- Last Train (bridge), a bidding convention in the card game contract bridge
- "Last Train" (Christine Anu and Paul Kelly song), 1993
- "Last Train" (Tiësto and Firebeatz song), 2014
- "The Last Train", a 1950 short story by Fredric Brown
- "The Last Train", a song by Mondo Generator from the 2012 album Hell Comes to Your Heart

== See also ==
- Last Train Home (disambiguation)
