= Igor Churasov =

Russian serial killer and cannibal

- Born: Igor Viktorovich Churasov; 1966 (age 59–60); Ryazan Oblast, RSFSR
- Other names: "The Scavenger of Humanity" "The Bloody Circus Performer" "The Heartbreaker"
- Conviction: N/A
- Penalty: Involuntary commitment

Details
- Victims: 7
- Span of crimes: 1997–2000
- Country: Russia
- State: Ryazan
- Date apprehended: March 11, 2000
- Imprisoned at: Sychevsk Special Hospital in Smolensk, Smolensk Oblast

Igor Viktorovich Churasov (Russian: Игорь Викторович Чурасов; born 1966), known as The Scavenger of Humanity (Russian: Мусорщик человечества), is a Russian serial killer and cannibal who murdered seven people in Ryazan from 1997 to 2000, five with his accomplice Gennady Shurmanov. He earned his nickname from the fact that he ate some of his victims' remains after dismembering them.

In 2002, a court ruled that both men were incompetent to stand trial, and were interned in different psychiatric facilities.

== Early life ==
Very little is known about Churasov's early life. Born in 1966 in the Ryazan Oblast, he grew up in a normal household with his two parents and brother. After graduating from school, Churasov earned a living by low-skilled labor, but had no criminal record, no history of aggressive behaviour, was regarded positively by friends and was popular with women. In the early 1990s, he got a job at the Ryazan Circus, where he worked as an assistant, uniformer, prop designer and animal care worker.

During this period, he befriended ex-convict Gennady Emelkin, who later renamed himself Shurmanov after taking his wife's surname. The two men soon rented a wooden house in the Gorbaty Bridge area, located near the former Selmash club. Not long after, Churasov began to exhibit signs of mental illness. An erudite person, he spent a lot of his free time reading books on ideological literature, Russian philosophy, thanatology, theoretical and practical medicine, as he was interested in the dynamics and mechanisms of death, in addition to the spiritual meaning of it. He eventually developed a misanthropic view on humanity, in which people he considered "asocial" had no right to life and should be persecuted and exterminated. After having numerous conversations with Shurmanov on these topics, he eventually came to the realization that his friend also shared his viewpoints. Not long after, the pair decided to start committing murders.

== Murders ==
Between 1997 and 2000, Churasov committed seven murders, five of them jointly with Shurmanov. Their modus operandi consisted of luring victims to their rented home, where they would then attack and kill them in several ways, including strangulation, blunt force trauma and stabbing. The pair would then dismember the bodies and burn the remains in an old wood stove.

In one of the first murders, Churasov was aided by a third accomplice, 23-year-old Natalia Makartsova. She lured her friend Albina Noskova, also 23, to the two men's house, knowing full well that they would kill her. After Noskova entered the house, Churasov strangled her with a hose. While dismembering the corpse, Churasov cut out her heart and liver, which he then fried in a frying pan and ate. After that, in all subsequent murders, Churasov always kept the meat and part of the internal organs of his victims after the dismemberment of the bodies, which he then ate for the next few days.

== Arrest, investigation and trial ==
In the spring of 2000, Churasov and Shurmanov were arrested after a mutual acquaintance contacted the police and said that he had witnessed the two men murder someone. Both men admitted responsibility to the crime, as well as the remaining murders. During the investigative experiment, Churasov was taken under escort to the outskirts of Ryazan, where he guided law enforcement officers to a ravine, where they found the dismembered remains of the last victim. Based on their testimony, as well as numerous pieces of evidence, investigators were able to prove Churasov's guilt in seven murders.

During interrogations, Churasov tried to explain his motives to the interrogators. According to investigator Igor Kurkin, Churasov considered himself a "sanitary of society who freed [it] from unnecessary garbage, fallen people". He also recalled one time when he found a skull in the Lazarevskoye Cemetery, brought it home, washed and polished it, then poured some earth into it and started growing strawberries. Churasov claimed that he considered the strawberries to be a representation of life, while the skull represented death.

In early 2001, at one of the pre-trial hearings, Churasov and Shurmanov's lawyers filed a motion for psychiatric examinations to determine their sanity, which was granted. At the end of the same year, Churasov was transferred to the Serbsky Center, where he remained under surveillance for several months. It was eventually concluded that he suffered from a volatile form of schizophrenia, and was thus unable to distinguish right from wrong. On this basis, the Ryazan Regional Court ruled in 2002 that Churasov was legally insane, and that was to be interned at the Sychevsk Special Hospital in Smolensk.

Shurmanov would also be ruled incompetent to stand trial at a later date and interned at the same facility. For her role in the Noskova murder, Makartsova was convicted and sentenced to 6 years imprisonment.

== Current status ==
In 2013, Churasov was visited at the psychiatric facility by journalists for an interview. In said interview, he admitted to cannibalizing some of the victims' remains but denied killing them. He claimed that he suffered from anterograde amnesia and was unable to recall what exactly transpired. Churasov also said that he maintains ties with his mother and brother, who regularly visited him, and that he hoped he would be released someday.

The staff of the psychiatric clinic stated that Churasov had successfully completed the course treatment and has not posed a threat since the early 2010s. His attending physician later stated that while he was still unsure about the motive behind the murders, he maintains that Churasov did not pose a threat to anyone and that he should be released, but the court has repeatedly refused to grant permission.

== See also ==
- List of incidents of cannibalism
- List of Russian serial killers

== In the media ==
- Churasov and Shurmanov's crimes were covered in the episode "Scavengers of Humanity" (Russian: Мусорщики человечества) from the documentary series "The Price of Love" (Russian: Цена любви)
- A section from the episode "Capital Punishment" (Russian: Высшая мера наказания) from the documentary series "Above the Law (Russian: Вне закона) also covered their crimes
