= Paul Henteleff =

Canadian medical doctor (born 1931)

- Born: 1931 (age 94–95)
- Education: Medical degree
- Alma mater: University of Manitoba
- Occupations: Doctor; Businessman

Dr. Paul D. Henteleff (born 1931) led the world's first hospital-based terminal care unit.

== Career ==
Raised in Stonewall, Manitoba, Canada, by his parents nurse Lillian Axelrode and businessman Harry Henteleff, Dr. Paul Henteleff earned his medical degree from the University of Manitoba in 1956. He worked in a general family practice and trained in epidemiology and biostatistics at the London School of Hygiene and Tropical Medicine before becoming the assistant executive director of the Manitoba Health Services Commission from 1972 to 1974. In that role, he helped design the Manitoba personal-care-home program and facilitated Drs. Noralou and Les Roos turning the commission's routinely collected administrative information into data for innovative health-services research. Dr. Henteleff then returned to clinical practice at St. Boniface Hospital in Winnipeg, where he served from 1975 to 1991 as director of Canada's first hospital palliative care unit, established in November 1974. Hospital-based palliative care is a Canadian innovation developed independently in Winnipeg and Montreal. Dr. Henteleff’s advocacy efforts led to palliative care becoming a core service in Manitoba and his work influenced the development of palliative care across Canada. He modeled a flexible, interdisciplinary team approach to palliative care, which recognized nurses, social workers, psychologists, pharmacists and spiritual care-givers as valuable colleagues. The unit's innovations included death reviews, a bereavement program, and integrated home-care. Dr. Henteleff also co-authored the first study of depression and suicidal thoughts in terminal illness. He supports medically assisted dying.

== Honours ==
Dr. Henteleff was the founding president of the Canadian Palliative Care Association, which honoured him with an Award of Excellence in 2013. A lecture series is named in his honour. In 2016, Dr. Henteleff received an honorary degree from the University of Manitoba.
