= End-of-Life Nursing Education Consortium =

The End-of-Life Nursing Education Consortium (ELNEC) project is a national education initiative whose mission is to improve palliative care. The project provides an undergraduate and graduate nursing faculty, CE providers, staff development educators, specialty nurses in pediatrics, oncology, critical care, and geriatrics, and other nurses with training in palliative care so they can teach this information to nursing students and practicing nurses. ELNEC is a partnership between the American Association of Colleges of Nursing (AACN), Washington, DC and the City of Hope, Duarte, CA. The project provides undergraduate and graduate nursing faculty, CE providers, staff development educators, specialty nurses in pediatrics, oncology, critical care, and geriatrics, and other nurses with palliative care training. Once trained, these healthcare professionals go on to teach this essential information to nursing students and practicing nurses. The project, which began in February 2000, was initially funded by a major grant from The Robert Wood Johnson Foundation (RWJF). The National Cancer Institute (NCI), American Association of Colleges of Nursing (AACN), US Cancer Pain Relief Committee, the Aetna, Archstone, Oncology Nursing, California HealthCare, Milbank, Stupski, Open Society, and Cambia Health Foundations, and the Department of Veterans Affairs (VA) have provided additional funding.

== Current status ==
To date, over 22,300 nurses and other healthcare professionals representing all 50 US states, plus 96 international countries, have received ELNEC training through these national courses and are sharing this new expertise in educational and clinical settings. ELNEC Trainers are hosting professional development seminars for practicing nurses, incorporating ELNEC content into nursing curriculum, hosting regional training sessions to expand ELNEC's reach into rural and underserved communities, presenting ELNEC at national and international conferences, coordinating community partnerships, and improving the quality of nursing care in other innovative ways. It is estimated that since its inception ELNEC trainers have returned to their institutions and communities and have trained over 670,000 nurses and other healthcare providers.

== Courses offered ==
Currently offering: ELNEC-Advanced Practice Register Nurse (APRN), ELNEC-Core, ELNEC-Critical Care, ELNEC-Geriatric, ELNEC- Oncology APRN, ELNEC-Pediatric Palliative Care

Previously offered: ELNEC- Public Hospitals, ELNEC- Veterans Affairs, DNP Palliative Oncology Care

ELNEC also operates courses internationally and the curricula has been translated into other languages. Faculty members have traveled to 6 continents with participants representing 96 countries.

== Administration ==
The ELNEC project is administered by the American Association of Colleges of Nursing (AACN), Washington, DC, and the City of Hope National Medical Center, Los Angeles, CA and the faculty includes a national cadre of nursing leaders in palliative care. Betty Ferrell is the Principal Investigator of ELNEC and the Director of Nursing Research & Education and Professor at City of Hope. The ELNEC Project Directors are Rose Virani and Pam Malloy. ELNEC is also supported by a support staff team of project coordinators at City of Hope.
