= Death Studies =

- Discipline: Psychology
- Language: English
- Edited by: Robert A. Neimeyer

Publication details
- Publisher: Routledge (United Kingdom)
- Frequency: 10/year
- Impact factor: 2.1 (2025)

Standard abbreviations
- ISO 4: Death Stud.

Indexing
- ISSN: 0748-1187 (print); 1091-7683 (web)
- OCLC no.: 10890428

Links
- Journal homepage

Death Studies is a peer-reviewed academic journal published ten times a year by Routledge and sponsored by the Association for Death Education and Counseling – The Thanatology Association. It focuses on issues related to death, dying, bereavement, and death education.

== Publication history ==
Death Studies was formerly published as Death Education from 1977 to 1984. Its founding editor was Hannelore Wass. It was originally published by Hemisphere Publishing.

== Abstracting and indexing ==
According to the Journal Citation Reports, the journal has a 2016 impact factor of 1.160, ranking it 22nd out of 41 journals in the category "Social Issues," 25th out of 40 journals in the category, "Biomedical Social Sciences," and 69th out of 129 journals for the category, "Multidisciplinary Psychology."

Death Studies is indexed in:

- CINAHL
- EBSCOhost Online Research Databases
- H.W. Wilson Social Science Abstracts (SocialSciAbs)
- MEDLINE
- PsycINFO
