= At the Heart of Gold: Inside the USA Gymnastics Scandal =

- Television release poster
- Directed by: Erin Lee Carr
- Produced by: Steven Ungerleider; David Ulich
- Cinematography: Bryan Sarkinen
- Edited by: Cindy Lee
- Music by: Drum & Lace; Ian Hultquist
- Production companies: S. J. Gibson Films; Sidewinder Films
- Distributed by: HBO
- Release date: April 26, 2019 (Tribeca)
- Running time: 89 mins
- Country: United States
- Language: English

At the Heart of Gold: Inside the USA Gymnastics Scandal is a 2019 American documentary film directed by Erin Lee Carr. The film is produced by David Ulich, and Steven Ungerleider. The film is based on the USA Gymnastics sex abuse scandal.

== Premise ==
The film follows the sex abuse and molestation scandal surrounding USA Gymnastics team doctor Larry Nassar, interviewing gymnasts who used to be under his care and detailing the factors that allowed the situation to persist. It features impact statements given by the victims during Nassar's week-long sentencing hearing.

== Release ==
The film premiered at the 2019 Tribeca Film Festival, and showed on HBO on May 3, 2019.

=== Critical response ===
On the review aggregator Rotten Tomatoes, the film holds an approval rating of 100% based on 27 reviews, and an average rating of 8.3/10. The website's critical consensus reads, "At the Heart of Gold is a scathing indictment of institutional abuse that sensitively provides victims with a platform to tell their stories." Metacritic, which uses a weighted average, assigned the film a score of 82 out of 100, based on five critics, indicating "Universal acclaim".

Nick Schager, of Variety wrote, "In Kyle Stephens' heartbreaking statement to the court about the personal and familial ramifications of Nassar's actions, the film exposes the far-reaching consequences of such monstrousness, which no matter the courageous and inspiring resilience of its many survivors, has clearly left profound, lasting scars."

Robert Abele of The Los Angeles Times wrote, "Hearing from the girls, whether from the courtroom footage or in testimonials for Carr's camera, is ultimately what makes "At the Heart of Gold," even in its no-nonsense execution, necessary viewing."

Sophie Gilbert of The Atlantic wrote, "To see such a vast group of women speaking out is shocking, but also encouraging—together, they represent something undeniably powerful. But you're left wondering what it means that there had to be so many of them for Nassar to finally get justice."

=== Accolades ===
Nominated

- 2019, MTV Movie & TV Award for Best Documentary
