= Robin's Wish =

- Promotional poster
- Directed by: Tylor Norwood
- Produced by: Ben Sinclair; Tylor Norwood; Shoshana R. Ungerleider
- Cinematography: Tylor Norwood
- Edited by: Scott Fitzloff
- Music by: Aaron Drake
- Production company: Quotable Pictures
- Distributed by: Vertical Entertainment
- Release date: September 1, 2020
- Running time: 77 minutes
- Country: United States
- Language: English

Robin's Wish is a 2020 American documentary film directed by Tylor Norwood. The film offers a look into the life and final days of Robin Williams, and how his struggles with diffuse Lewy body disease impacted his acting career and contributed to his death by suicide. The film was produced by Ben Sinclair, executive produced by physician and journalist, Shoshana R. Ungerleider and released digitally and on-demand on September 1, 2020.

== Background ==
Robin Williams' widow, Susan Schneider Williams, chose the film's title, and approached director Tylor Norwood to make the film. Initially resistant, Norwood said he wanted to help people "understand the pain [Williams] felt as his talents and faculties rapidly slipped away" and he hopes the film "rights a wrong that was done to him, and takes away a cloud that has unjustly hung over his legacy for far too long." Interviews include Susan Williams and Shawn Levy (who directed Williams in the Night at the Museum series), as well as John R. Montgomery and David E. Kelley, who both worked with Williams on the TV series The Crazy Ones.

== Reception ==
On the review aggregator website Rotten Tomatoes, the film holds an approval rating of 90%, based on 58 reviews, with an average rating of 7.2/10. The site's critics consensus reads: "Robin's Wish offers an emotional look at the end of a life suddenly cut short—and pays warm tribute to the brilliant legacy that was left behind." On Metacritic, the film has a weighted average score of 73 out of 100, based on 13 critics, indicating "generally favorable reviews".

Frank Scheck of The Hollywood Reporter called the film "a moving coda to a life ended much too soon" and wrote: "Robin's Wish suffers at times from its lack of objectivity. Williams' widow is clearly the project's driving force, with much of the story told from her perspective (his children, on the other hand, are not heard from at all). Nonetheless, the film, which incorporates testimony from several medical experts, fully succeeds in its admirable goal of using Williams' story to shed light on a disease with which many people were previously unfamiliar."
