= Extremis (film) =

- Film poster
- Directed by: Dan Krauss
- Produced by: Dan Krauss
- Cinematography: Dan Krauss
- Edited by: Jeff Gilbert
- Music by: Justin Melland
- Production company: f/8 Filmworks
- Distributed by: Netflix
- Release date: April 17, 2016 (Tribeca Film Festival)
- Running time: 24 minutes
- Country: United States
- Language: English

Extremis is a 2016 American short documentary that follows Dr. Jessica Zitter, an ICU and palliative care specialist who leads a team in the Highland Hospital ICU in Oakland, California. She helps families make end-of-life decisions for their loved ones, who are often terminally ill and or on life support. It is directed and produced by Dan Krauss. It was shot at an intensive care unit at Highland Hospital in Oakland, California. The film was funded, in part, by physician and end of life advocate, Dr. Shoshana R. Ungerleider. There are five patients shown in the documentary; however, it only focuses on three patients.

== Plot ==
Dr. Jessica Zitter graduated from Harvard and is an attending physician at Highland Hospital on Oakland, California. Aside from working at the hospital, she has published many articles as well as her own book, "Extreme Measures: Finding a Better Path to the End of Life". Her work is focused on end of life care and how to improve it. The documentary begins as Zitter attempts to communicate with a patient named Donna who has myotonic dystrophy. Because of her breathing tube and other equipment attached to her it is very difficult for Donna to communicate. At that moment, Zitter had to sympathize and try to make the patient as comfortable as possible while trying to figure out a way to help her communicate. As the doctors search for a specialist and other options, Donna's condition deteriorates, and her family decides to take her off the breathing tube. One day later, Donna dies.

After Donna, the film introduces Selena, who stopped breathing on the way to the ER and suffered severe brain damage. Unlike Donna's family, Selena's daughter is not ready to let her go and clings on to hope. In this case the doctors attempt to reason with Selena's daughter to let her know that Selena will not recover. When interviewed, Selena's daughter said that turning off her mother's life support would feel like murder. Selena was kept on life support and regained periods of consciousness, but died six months later.

The next patient shown is a homeless man who had been institutionalized for a long time and the doctors had not yet made a prognosis. This patient did not have any family or friends to make the medical decisions for him if anything happened, and when it comes to this the doctors have to question whether the patient seems stable enough to decide for himself. The film shows the doctors trying to communicate with the patient.

The other two patients are not named. One is a new grandmother, whose family decides to take her off all machines. The other patient is a man who can still communicate but needs to be attached to a life support machine. He expresses his desire not to be kept on the machine and accepts his fate, though his son does not agree with his decision.

== Awards ==
- 2017: Academy Awards – Best Documentary Short Subject – Nominated
- 2016: Tribeca Film Festival - Best Documentary Short - Winner
