= BJ Miller =

American physician, author and speaker

- Born: Bruce Miller; Chicago, Illinois, US
- Occupation: Physician
- Known for: TED Talk "What really matters at the end of life"
- Notable work: End Game

Bruce L. Miller Jr. is an American physician, author, and speaker. He is a practicing hospice and palliative medicine physician and is best known for his 2015 TED Talk, "What Really Matters at the End of Life". Miller has been on the teaching faculty at UCSF School of Medicine since 2007. He sees patients and caregivers through his online palliative care service, Mettle Health.

In film, Miller is the subject of Netflix's Academy Award-nominated short documentary, End Game by veteran directors Rob Epstein, Jeffrey Friedman and executive produced by physician and film producer, Shoshana R. Ungerleider. His book for approaching the end of life, A Beginner’s Guide to the End, was co-authored with Shoshana Berger and published in 2019. Miller has a chapter giving advice in Tim Ferriss' book Tools of Titans.

Miller formerly served as Executive Director of San Francisco’s Zen Hospice Project, now the Zen Caregiving Project

== Personal life ==
Miller is a triple amputee, a result of climbing on top of a parked train, his watch arcing to the power overhead, and getting electrocuted in 1990 when he was a student at Princeton.
