= David C. Ulich =

American film producer and attorney

David C. Ulich is an American film producer and attorney who has supported abuse prevention in sports.

Ulich founded and was a producer of Sidewinder Films best known for producing documentaries, including the Television Academy Honors Award winning At the Heart of Gold: Inside the USA Gymnastics Scandal, the Oscar-nominated short documentary End Game, and the Emmy-nominated Munich '72 and Beyond. Sidewinder’s 2021 film Waterman, about Duke Kahanamoku was narrated by Jason Momoa.

In 2017, Ulich was nominated for the 38th Annual News & Documentary Emmy Awards in the “Outstanding Research” category for his work on Munich ’72 and Beyond.

In his former role as President of The Foundation for Global Sports Development, Ulich participated in panel discussions following educational screenings of At the Heart of Gold: Inside the USA Gymnastics Scandal to help spread awareness about abuse prevention in sport. He was also a member of the advisory committee for Child USA’s Game Over Commission to Protect Youth Athletes.

Ulich’s work in abuse prevention led to the launch of the Courage First Athlete Helpline in partnership with Childhelp in 2022. Serving the U.S. and Canada, the toll-free service aims to build awareness around abuse in sport and offer confidential support to anyone concerned about emotional, physical, or sexual abuse in the athletic community.

== Works ==
=== Films ===
- 2015 - Munich '72 and Beyond - Producer
- 2017 - End Game - Executive Producer
- 2018 - At the Heart of Gold: Inside the USA Gymnastics Scandal- Producer
- 2020 - Positive All the Way - Director and Producer
- 2021 - Citizen Ashe - Executive Producer
- 2021 - Waterman - Producer

=== Books ===
- Munich ’72 and Beyond: Based on the Award-Winning Film of Redemption – A Monument of Remembrance (Dunham Books, 2018)

== Education ==
- 1981 Haverford College - B.A.
- 1984 - University of California, Los Angeles, School of Law - Juris Doctor
  - Member of the UCLA Law Review
- 1985 - New York University - L.L.M.

== Personal ==
David Ulich is married to Pamela Conley Ulich, who served as Mayor for the City of Malibu 2009–2010. Together they have two children.

David is the grandson of Robert Ulich, German professor of the Philosophy and History of Education at Harvard.

== Affiliations ==
David Ulich was President of The Foundation for Global Sports Development.

Ulich serves on the LA Sports Council, the International Fair Play Committee Council, and the Southern California Committee for the Olympic Games, and formerly served on the U.S. Olympic and Paralympic Foundation .

Ulich also served as a board member for LA 2028, and was part of the Los Angeles Olympic Bid Committee which successfully won the bid for the 2028 Summer Games.
