= Shoshana R. Ungerleider =

American doctor and journalist

Shoshana Ungerleider MD
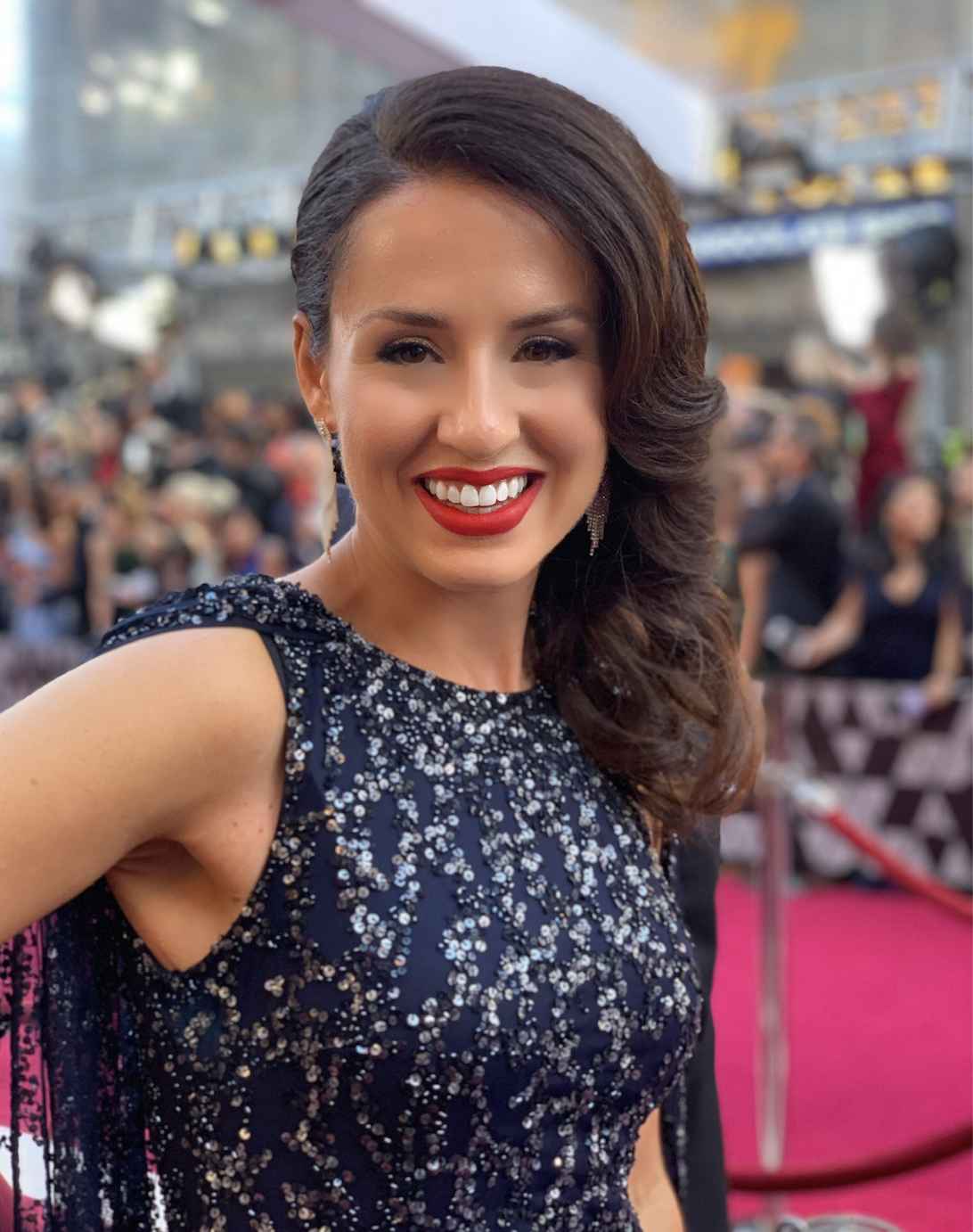
- Ungerleider in 2019
- Occupations: Physician, journalist, film producer
- Notable work: Host, TED (conference) Health; End Game; Extremis; Robin's Wish; Last Train Home

Shoshana Rebecca Ungerleider is an American medical doctor, journalist and film producer. She was educated at The University of Oregon and Oregon Health and Science University. As of June 2021, Ungerleider is the host and producer of the TED Health and Before We Go podcasts, practices internal medicine, runs a non-profit that she founded, End Well, and during the COVID-19 pandemic, contributed regularly as a medical expert on CNN, MSNBC, CBS and Fox News.

== Early life ==
Ungerleider was born in Eugene, Oregon, to Jewish American parents. She is the daughter of American documentary film producer, author and sports psychologist Steven Ungerleider, and Sharon Margolin Ungerleider and granddaughter of Joy Ungerleider-Mayerson, author and Jewish philanthropist, and great granddaughter of D. Samuel Gottesman, a Hungarian-born, American pulp-paper merchant, financier and philanthropist

== Career ==
Ungerleider practiced internal medicine in San Francisco at Sutter Health's California Pacific Medical Center until becoming a primary care physician at Crossover Health and is president of a non-profit organization she founded in 2017 called End Well which aims to improve end-of-life care for all. She is an advocate for palliative care education and endowed a program at California Pacific Medical Center to teach medical residents.

As a journalist, she has published articles about end of life and other medical topics in popular media including Newsweek, USA Today, Scientific American, TIME, Vox, San Francisco Chronicle and Stat and has appeared regularly as a medical expert contributor on CNN, MSNBC and Fox News as well as PBS NewsHour and CBSN.

In film, Ungerleider executive produced Netflix's Academy Award-nominated short documentary, End Game, by directors Rob Epstein and Jeffrey Friedman as well as short film Last Train Home, in 2026. She was a major funder of Netflix's Extremis, an Academy Award-nominated, Emmy-nominated short documentary by director, Dan Krauss. In 2020, Ungerleider executive produced Robin's Wish, a feature-length documentary about the final years of actor and comedian Robin Williams.

In March 2018, she planned the San Francisco March for Our Lives rally to protest gun violence in schools where thousands marched from Civic Center Plaza to the Embarcadero (San Francisco).

== End Well ==
Ungerleider founded endwellproject.org in 2017, a non-profit organization focused on education and awareness to improve the end of life experience where she remains President of the Board of Directors. The organization began as End Well Symposium; which first convened in 2017 in San Francisco and has also become an educational media platform. Its perspective ranges from culture, healthcare, design, business, technology to policy where notable individuals such as actress Taraji P. Henson, country music singer Tim McGraw, comedian Tig Notaro, Ricki Lake, actor Yvette Nicole Brown, style icon Stacy London, Bravo (American TV channel) reality host Andy Cohen, therapist Esther Perel, Dr. Atul Gawande, Dr. BJ Miller, singer Melissa Etheridge and others have spoken.

== Awards ==
In 2018, Ungerleider was named to San Francisco Business Times 40 Under 40 class. In 2018, she was named Woman of the Year by Women Health Care Executives. She was named to Becker's Hospital Review, 90 healthcare leaders under 40 in 2018. In June 2020, Ungerleider was named a 2020 Changemaker by Hospice News, an aging and end of life industry publication.

== Filmography ==
Year	Title	Role	Notes
2026	Last Train Home	Executive Producer	
2020	Robin's Wish	Executive producer	
2018	End Game	Executive producer	Academy Award-nominated
2016	Extremis	Major funder	Academy Award, Emmy-nominated
