= Howard Ungerleider =

American corporate executive (born 1968)

- Born: 1968 (age 57–58)
- Occupations: Chief financial officer and president
- Employer: Dow
- Website: Ungerleider at Dow.com

Howard Ungerleider (born 1968) is an American business executive who was the chief financial officer (CFO) and president of Dow Inc., following five years as CFO of DowDuPont Inc.

== Biography ==
Howard Ungerleider was born in 1968.

Ungerleider began his career at Dow Chemical in 1990 and held a number of roles prior to being named Dow's CFO in 2014, including North American Commercial Vice President for Dow's Basic Plastics businesses (2006–2008), and Vice President of Investor Relations (2008–2011). In 2016, he was named the future CFO of DowDupont.

In 2006, he was named Commercial Vice President for Dow's basic plastics units in North America. Until 2011 Ungerleider served as Vice President of Investor Relations, before being named President of Dow's Performance Plastics division. In 2012, he also joined Dow's most senior executive team. According to Dow, the Advanced Materials division grew to approximately $11 billion in annual sales during his tenure.

Ungerleider was elected Dow's Chief Financial Officer (CFO) by Dow's Board of Directors on October 1, 2014.

In May 2016, he was named the future Chief Financial Officer of DowDuPont, to be effective upon the closure of the merger of Dow and DuPont. The combined company was also slated to subsequently separate into three independent publicly traded companies, individually focused on agriculture, materials science and specialty products. Ungerleider resigned from the board of directors on April 1, 2019, when Dow separated from DowDuPont, and became the CFO and president of the newly formed Dow Inc.

In October 2023, he retired from his Chief Financial Officer position at Dow.
