= Association for Death Education and Counseling =

Professional membership organization

The Association for Death Education and Counseling (ADEC) is a multidisciplinary professional membership organization involved in death education and supportive counseling in areas related to death, dying processes, loss, and grief.

== History ==
Founded in 1976, the organization's 1,500 members around the world: the majority live and practice in North America. With the death awareness movement in full swing across North American and Europe by the 1970s, the genesis for the organization that would become the Association for Death Education and Counseling was in a seminar on death education at University of Rhode Island in 1975 led by death education pioneers Dan Leviton, Gene Knott, and Grace Manov. Originally named the Forum for Death Education and Counseling when it was granted tax exempt status in January 1976, the name was changed to its current form in 1986.

== Purpose ==
The Association seeks to improve the study and practices related to thanatology. Its members represent many different professional disciplines including university educators, psychologists, clergy, social workers, nurses, physicians, professional counselors, and funeral directors. The association developed a Code of Ethics to help assure that its members subscribe to generally-accepted ethical principles such as those articulated in the Belmont Report but with specific reference to end-of-life care, bereavement counseling, and death education. Members of ADEC include leading scholars and clinicians in the field of thanatology; editors of two of the leading peer-reviewed journals in the field, Death Studies (Robert A. Neimeyer) and Omega: Journal of Death & Dying (Kenneth J. Doka) are active members and past presidents of the Association.

An important hallmark of the association's mission and activities includes assuring professional excellence in the services rendered by members. In its Code of Ethics, ADEC declares "The Association envisions a world in which dying, death, and bereavement are recognized as fundamental and significant aspects of the human experience. Therefore, the Association, ever committed to being on the forefront of thanatology, provides a home for professionals from diverse backgrounds to advance the body of knowledge and to promote practical applications of research and theory." The association publishes an encyclopedia containing state-of-the science perspectives on the field of thanatology, hosts regular web seminars and conferences for the education of professionals in death education and counseling, creates partnerships with universities and other organizations, and has created a credentialing program to provide a type of board certification for practitioners in the field. The Association for Death Education and Counseling requires that all members subscribe to and conduct themselves in accordance with the tenets of the ADEC Code of Ethics.
