= Munich '72 and Beyond =

Short documentary film

Munich '72 and Beyond is a 2016 short documentary film.

The film documents the secrecy in which the ordeals undergone by the hostages has been shrouded, and follows the struggle of their surviving relatives to discover and reveal the barbarism of the attackers. In the film Ilana Romano, widow of murdered Olympic weightlifter Yossef Romano, reveals that her husband was castrated. Other hostages had their bones broken by their captors.

The film was produced by psychologist Steven Ungerleider, and David Ulich. Stephen Crisman was director, writer and executive producer. Michael Cascio was executive producer, and David Bret Egen was co-producer and editor. Production began in 2015 under the working title Munich 1972 & Beyond. The film's runtime is 44 minutes.

== Awards ==
=== 2016 ===
- LA Shorts Fest: Best Documentary

=== 2017 ===
- 38th Annual News & Documentary Awards: Nominated in the Outstanding Research category
- 2017 Euro Shorts Fest: Best Documentary
