= Last Train Home =

Last Train Home may refer to:

== Film ==
- Last Train Home (film), a 2009 documentary directed by Lixin Fan
- Last Train Home, a television film starring Noam Zylberman

== Music ==
- Last Train Home (album), a 2010 album by Foghat, also a song on the album
- Last Train Home EP, a 2009 EP by Ryan Star, or the title song
- "Last Train Home" (John Mayer song), 2021
- "Last Train Home" (Lostprophets song), 2003
- "Last Train Home" (Pat Metheny Group song), 1987
- Pat Metheny Group Essential Collection: Last Train Home, a 2015 Pat Metheny Group compilation album
- "Last Train Home", an unreleased single by Shaheen Jafargholi
- "Last Train Home", song by Network 3

== Games ==
- Last Train Home (video game), 2023 video game developed by Ashborne Games
