= End Game (2018 film) =

2018 short documentary film by Rob Epstein and Jeffrey Friedman

- Film poster
- Directed by: Rob Epstein; Jeffrey Friedman
- Produced by: Rob Epstein; Jeffrey Friedman; Rebekah Fergusson; William Hirsch; Shoshana R. Ungerleider; Steven Ungerleider; David Ulich
- Cinematography: Rob Epstein; Rebekah Fergusson
- Edited by: Rob Epstein; Jeffrey Friedman
- Music by: T. Griffin; Máté Papp
- Production company: Telling Pictures
- Distributed by: Netflix
- Release dates: January 21, 2018 (Sundance); May 4, 2018 (United States)
- Running time: 40 minutes
- Country: United States
- Languages: English; Persian

End Game is a 2018 American short documentary film by Rob Epstein and Jeffrey Friedman about terminally ill patients in a San Francisco hospital meeting medical practitioners seeking to change the perception around life and death. The film was executive produced by Steven Ungerleider and Shoshana R. Ungerleider. It was released by Netflix.

== Synopsis ==
The documentary begins with Dr. Pantilat, the palliative care doctor at the University of California, San Francisco, visiting terminally ill patients to speak with them about palliative care. The first patient he speaks about this with is Kym Anderson and her husband. Dr. Pantilat begins to describe palliative care as helping people live as well as possible for as long as possible; a care that focuses on not only the disease but the whole person, where there are people to help the patient with their symptoms, ensure the patient has the information they need to make complex decisions about their health, and have an extra layer of support for themselves and their family. Despite Dr. Pantilat’s attempt to bring light to palliative care, Kym and her husband do not side with palliative care as an option for Kym’s remaining time. The label the couple has associated with palliative care is "kissing it goodbye".

The documentary then proceeds to the Zen Caregiving Project, where there has been the acquisition of a new patient named Bruce. Bruce is 66 years old and has made the choice to stop dialysis. Dr. BJ Miller, a palliative care physician, and his colleagues welcome Bruce into the home.

Within the Zen Caregiving Project is another patient named Pat Harris. Pat has been diagnosed with fibroids and uterus cancer. Despite the circumstances, Pat mentions she is doing well, as she has people in the Zen Caregiving Project who help her watch the symptoms she experiences and understand what is right or wrong with it, people that give her medicine and monitor it, so she does not have to do it alone. Pat then goes onto describe a possible treatment to prolong her life in chemotherapy. To assist Pat with her decision, registered nurses from the palliative care team help Pat weigh out her options. Ultimately, Pat decides to accept the chemotherapy treatment in an attempt to prolong her life.

Dr. Pantilat and his colleagues then meet with Mitra, a 45-year-old woman battling cancer, and her family. Dr. Pantilat and his team ask Mitra’s family whether or not they would prefer to provide treatment for Mitra or keep her at home and provide care from there. The decision of prolonging Mitra’s life is split between her mother, Vija, and her husband, Hamid. Dr. Pantilat and his team continue to talk through the situation with Mitra’s family to help answer their questions and ultimately choose what they feel is right. As part of the information being provided by Dr. Pantilat and his team, Dr. Bivona proposes the idea that Mitra becomes part of a research program where doctors try to understand what happened to the cancer via autopsy.

As the documentary progresses, Dr. Pantilat had his role as the palliative care doctor taken over by Giovanni Elia. Dr. Elia meets with Mitra and her family, where Mitra admits she is no longer doing well. Dr. Elia and his supporting cast then begin to speak with Mitra’s family about Mitra’s state; the doctors admit that Mitra is looking better from a short-term perspective, but she has a limited time to live. Dr. Elia asks Mitra’s family where she would like to be during these final moments of her life, where he mentions that inpatient hospice is a choice for Mitra. Mitra’s mother disagrees with the idea of inpatient hospice, as she would like to be with Mitra until her last breath; however, Mitra’s family is torn with the decision. As Mitra’s condition worsens, Azita, Mitra’s sister, explains to her mother that caring for Mitra at home would not serve as a just option for Mitra nor for Vaji.

Dr. Miller eventually meets with Thekla, who is experiencing shortness of breath, at the University of California, San Francisco, Symptom Management Service. Dr Miller does not necessarily dive into what Thekla’s shortness of breath may lead to, but rather he encourages Thekla to form a relationship with death, so that death is known and not as frightening. Dr. Miller attempts to change Thekla’s perspective on death, as he mentions that one cannot know what it is exactly like to be dead, so all that can be done is getting acclimated with the mystery that is called death.

As the documentary comes to a close, Dr. Miller explains that there is nothing medical about death, but it is something that is purely human and a time to celebrate and rejoice the deceased's life.

== Cast ==
- Mitra: A 45 year old woman battling a devastating cancer.
- BJ Miller: A disabled speaker and physician practicing palliative care.
- Pat: A patient suffering from fibroids and uterus cancer.
- Kym: A patient suffering from an undisclosed disease.
- Thekla: A patient experiencing disease with shortness of breath as a symptom.
- Bruce: A patient who has discontinued his use of dialysis.
- Dr. Pantilat: The doctor on the palliative care team at the University of California, San Francisco.
- Hamid: Mitra's husband.
- Vaji: Mitra's mom.
- Trever Bivona: Another doctor a part of the palliative care team.
- Giovanni Elia: The palliative care doctor taking over the role of Dr. Pantilat.
- Azita: Mitra's sister.

== Reception ==
=== Critical response ===
On Rotten Tomatoes, the film has an approval rating of 100% based on reviews from seven critics, with an average rating of 7/10.

Peter Debruge of Variety wrote: "Miller's insights have been so useful as to have been featured by Oprah Winfrey, and one needn't be hospitalized or faced with losing relatives to benefit from his unique perspective."

=== Accolades ===
End Game was nominated for the Academy Award for Best Documentary (Short Subject) at the 91st Academy Awards. It was also nominated for the Short Film Grand Jury Prize at the Sundance Film Festival.
