= Steven Ungerleider =

American psychologist (1949–2023)

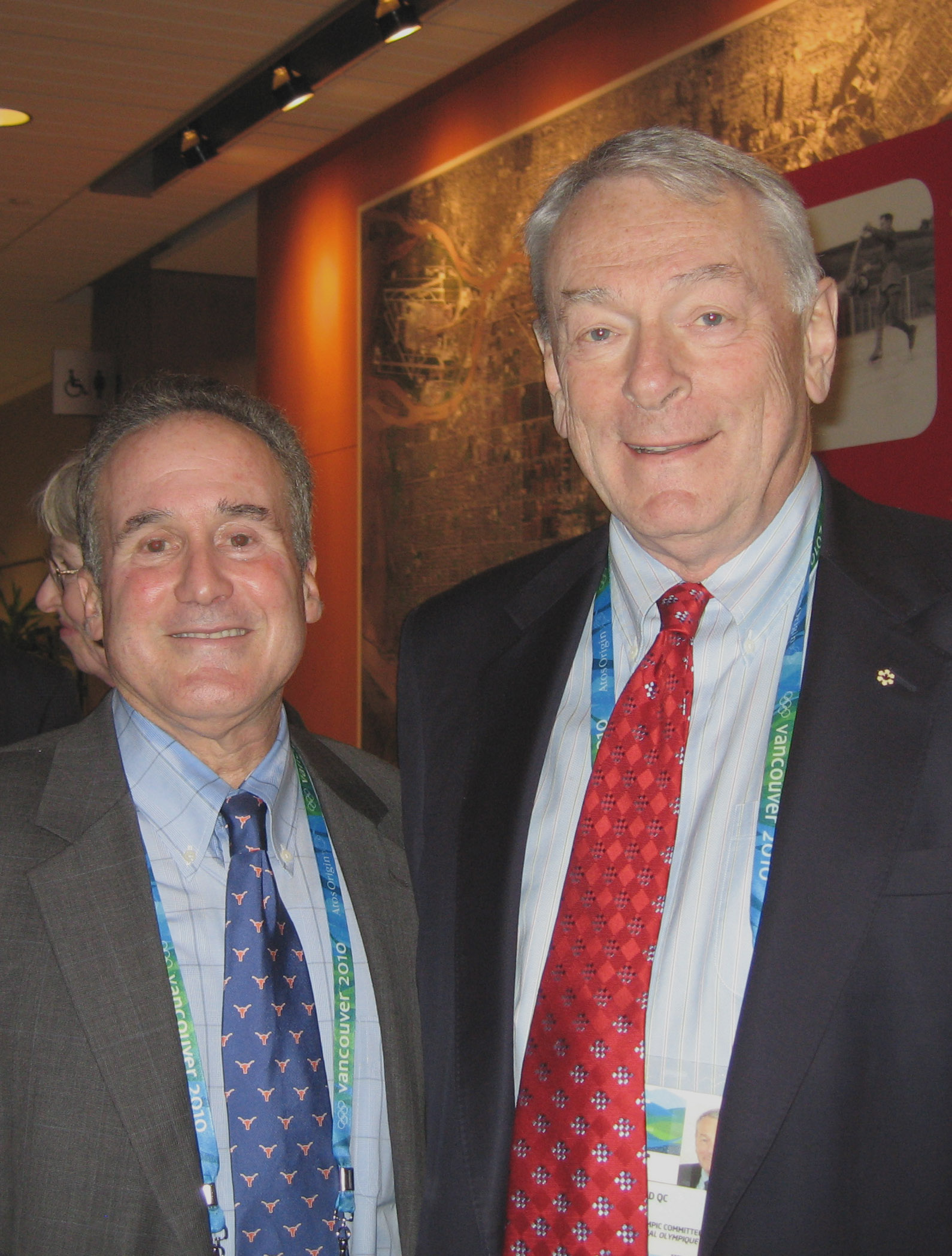
- Ungerleider (left) with Dick Pound (right) in 2010
- Born: June 14, 1949
- Died: March 18, 2023 (aged 73); Healdsburg, California, U.S.
- Occupation: Sports psychologist
- Children: Shoshana R. Ungerleider; Ariel Ungerleider Kelley
- Family: Samuel Gottesman (grandfather)

Steven Ungerleider (June 14, 1949 – March 18, 2023) was an American sports psychologist, author, and documentary film producer.

== Biography ==
Ungerleider was born to a Jewish family, the son of Joy (née Gottesman) and Samuel Ungerleider. His grandfather was D. Samuel Gottesman. He was a graduate of the University of Texas at Austin. He held a PhD from the University of Oregon. As an undergraduate, he competed in gymnastics for the University of Texas.

Ungerleider's first documentary film, Munich '72 and Beyond, was released in 2016.

Ungerleider had two daughters: physician and film producer Shoshana R. Ungerleider; and attorney Ariel Ungerleider Kelley.

Ungerleider died in Healdsburg, California, on March 18, 2023, at the age of 73 from pancreatic cancer.

== Films ==
- 2016 - Munich '72 and Beyond - Producer
- 2018 - End Game - Executive Producer
- 2018 - At the Heart of Gold: Inside the USA Gymnastics Scandal – Producer
- 2020 - Positive All the Way - Director and Producer
- 2021 - Citizen Ashe - Executive Producer
- 2021 - Waterman - Producer

== Books ==
- Quest For Success (WRS/Spence Publications, 1994)
- Mental Training For Peak Performance (Rodale Press, 1996)
- Faust's Gold: Inside the East German Doping Machine (St.Martin's Press)
- Beyond Strength (McGraw-Hill, 1991) with co-author Dr. Jacqueline Golding
